= Pink =

Pale tint of red

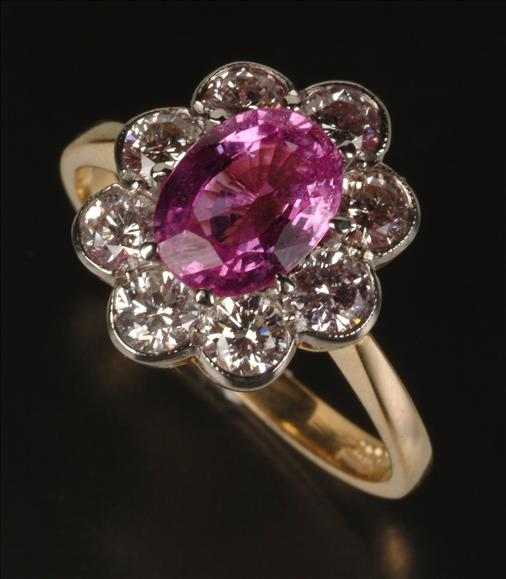
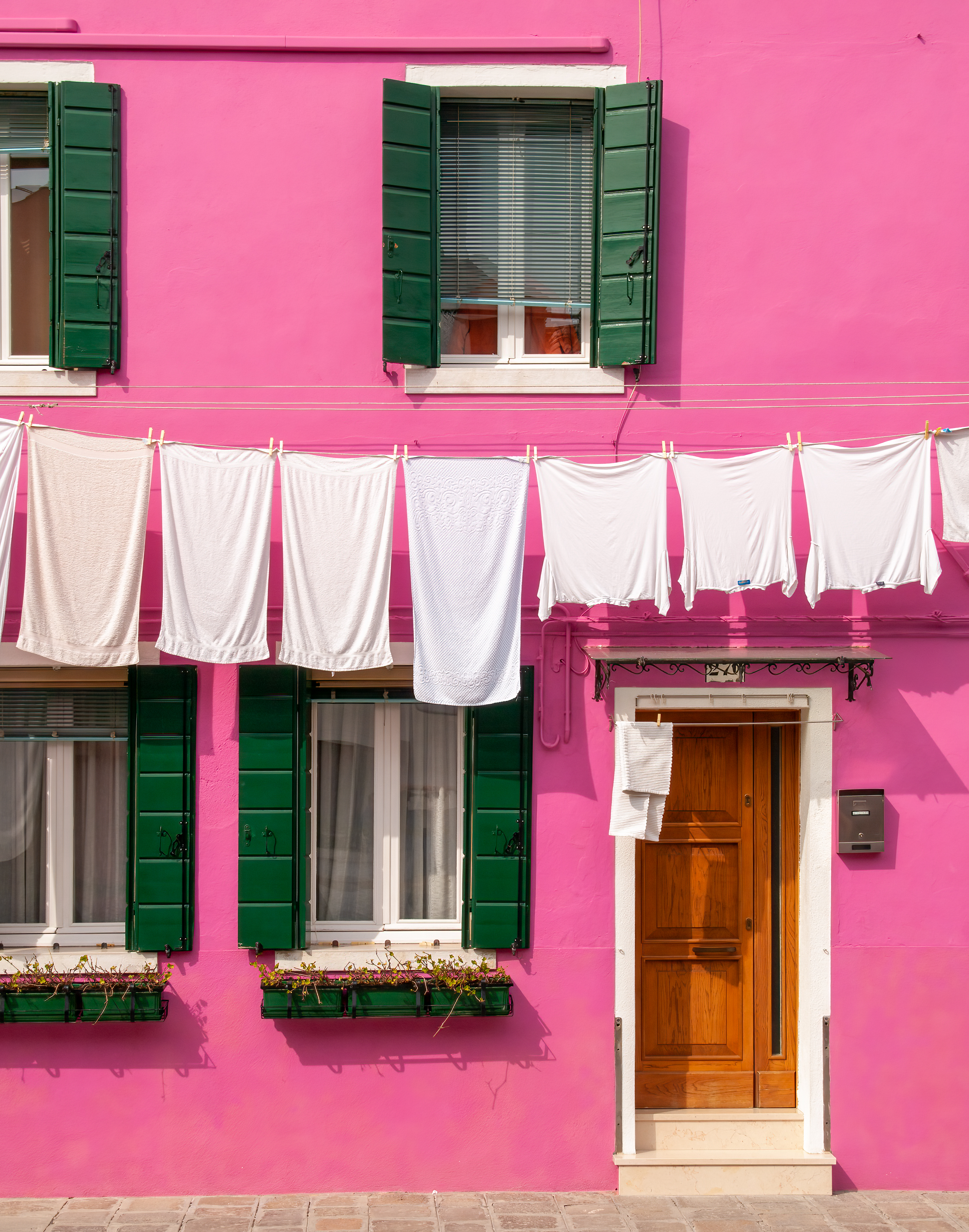
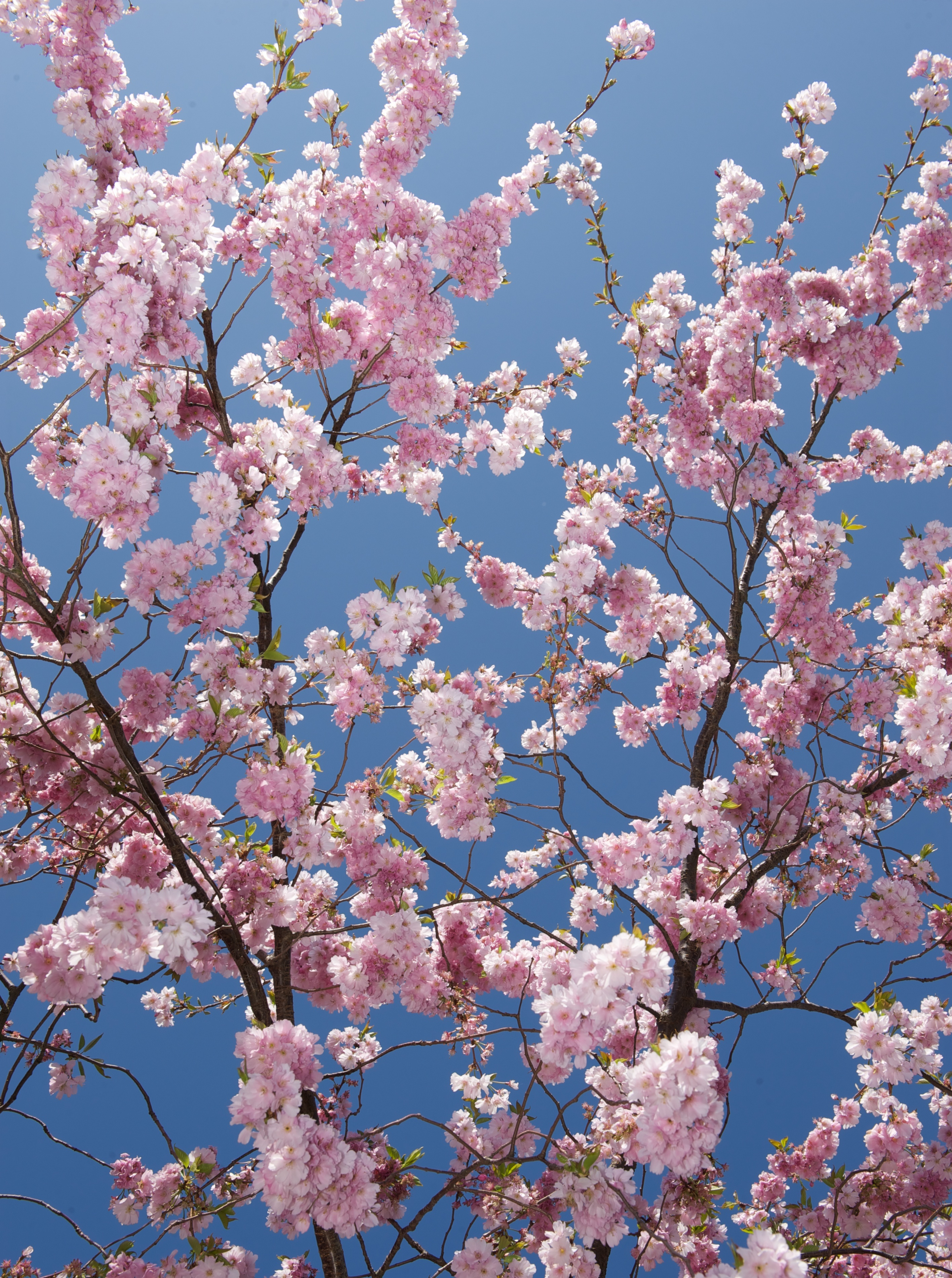
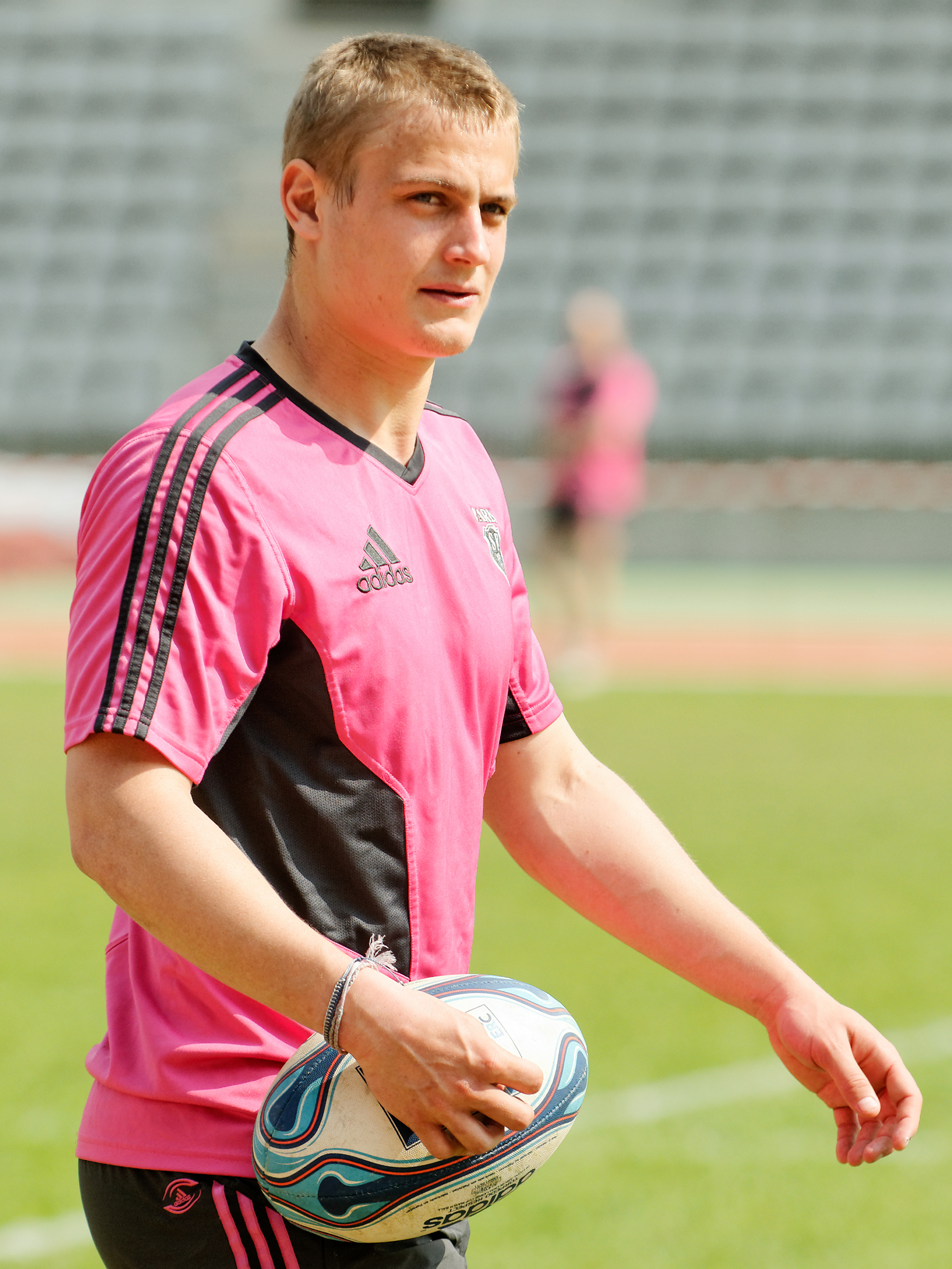
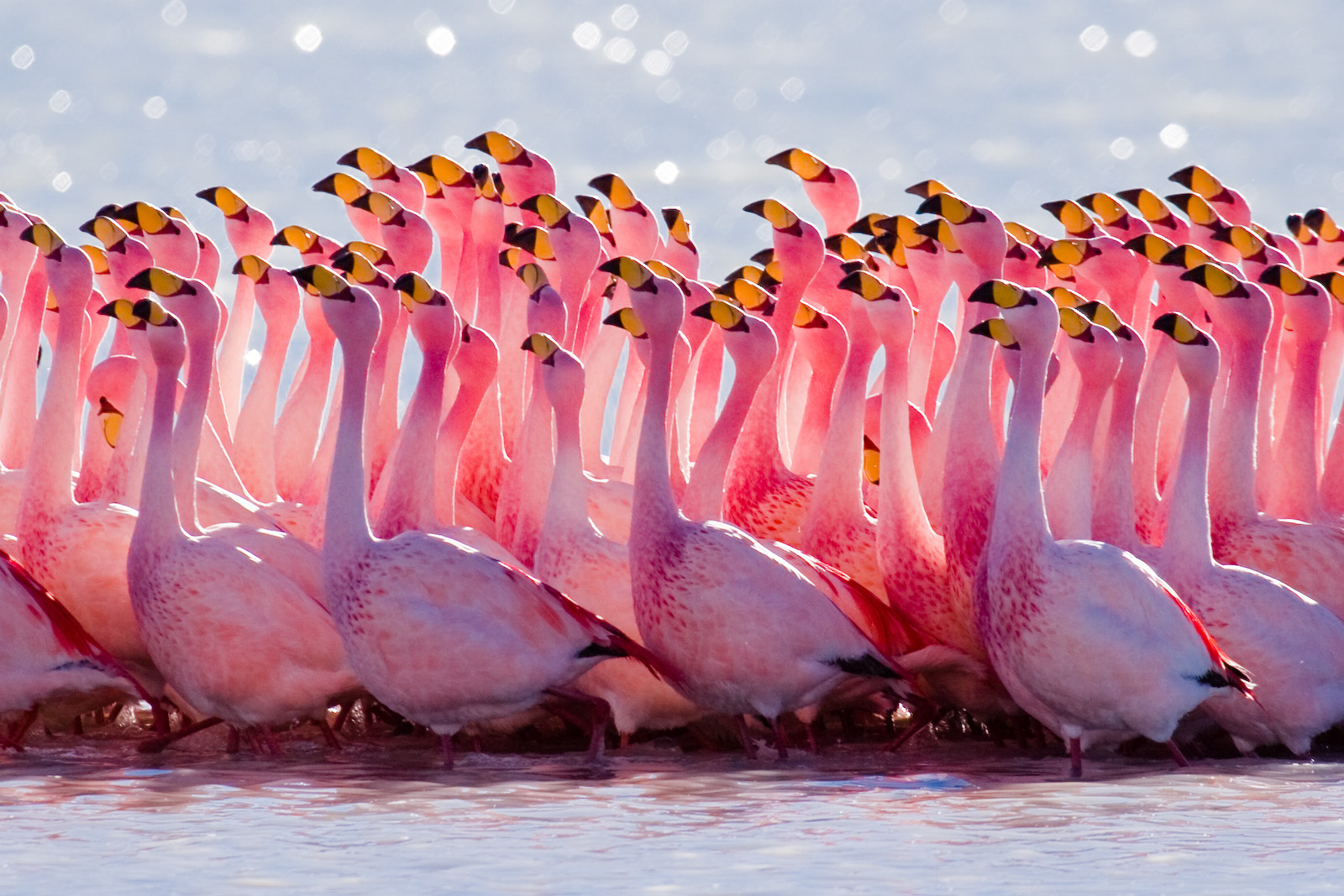
- Clockwise, from top left: A pink sapphire ring; facade of a house in Italy; Jules Plisson in a pink jersey; flamingoes; the branches of a cherry blossom tree.

Color coordinates
- Hex triplet: #FFC0CB
- sRGB^{B} (r, g, b): (255, 192, 203)
- HSV (h, s, v): (350°, 25%, 100%)
- CIELCh_{uv} (L, C, h): (84, 39, 1°)
- Source: HTML/CSS
- B: Normalized to [0–255] (byte)

Pink is a pale tint of red or rose, the color of the pink flower. It was first used as a color name in the late 17th century. A combination of pink and white is associated with innocence, whereas a combination of pink and black links to eroticism and seduction.

In the 21st century, pink is seen as a symbol of femininity, though it has not always been seen this way. Prior to the second half of the 20th century, pink frequently reflected masculinity. Scholars have linked the decisive feminization of pink to the emergence of Barbie in 1959.

== Etymology and definitions ==
The color pink is named after the flowers, pinks, flowering plants in the genus Dianthus, and derives from the frilled edge of the flowers. The verb "to pink" dates from the 14th century and means "to decorate with a perforated or punched pattern" (possibly from German picken, "to peck"). It has survived to the current day in pinking shears, hand-held scissors that cut a zig-zagged line to prevent fraying.

=== Optics ===
In optics, the word "pink" can refer to any of the pale shades of colors between bluish red to red in hue, of medium to high lightness, and of low to moderate saturation. Although pink is generally considered a tint of red, the colors of most tints of pink are slightly bluish, and lie between red and magenta. A few variations of pink, such as salmon color, lean toward orange.

== History, art, and fashion ==
The color pink has been described in literature since ancient times. In the Odyssey, written in approximately 800 BCE, Homer wrote "Then, when the child of morning, rosy-fingered dawn appeared..." Roman poets also described the color. Roseus is the Latin word meaning "rosy" or "pink." Lucretius used the word to describe the dawn in his epic poem On the Nature of Things (De rerum natura).

=== Literature ===
- In Spanish and Italian, a romantic novel is known as a "pink novel" (novela rosa in Spanish, romanzo rosa in Italian).
- In Nathaniel Hawthorne's 1835 short story, Young Goodman Brown, Faith is wearing a pink ribbon in her hair which represents her innocence.
- Carl Surely's short story "Dinsdale's Pink" is a coming of age tale of a young man growing up in Berlin in the 1930s, dealing with issues of gender, sexuality and politics.
- In Louisa May Alcott's 1868–69 book Little Women, Amy March uses blue and pink ribbons to tell the difference between her sister Meg's newborn twins.

=== Art and fashion throughout the years ===
Pink was not a common color in the fashion of the Middle Ages; nobles usually preferred brighter reds, such as crimson. However, it did appear in women's fashion and religious art. In the 13th and 14th centuries, in works by Cimabue and Duccio, the Christ child was sometimes portrayed dressed in pink, the color associated with the body of Christ.

In the high Renaissance painting the Madonna of the Pinks by Raphael, the Christ child is presenting a pink flower to the Virgin Mary. The pink was a symbol of marriage, showing a spiritual marriage between the mother and child.

During the Renaissance, pink was mainly used for the flesh color of white faces and hands. The pigment commonly used for this was called light cinabrese; it was a mixture of the red earth pigment called sinopia, or Venetian red, and a white pigment called Bianco San Genovese, or lime white. In his famous 15th century manual on painting, Il Libro Dell'Arte, Cennino Cennini described it this way: "This pigment is made from the loveliest and lightest sinopia that is found and is mixed and mulled with St. John's white, as it is called in Florence; and this white is made from thoroughly white and thoroughly purified lime. And when these two pigments have been thoroughly mulled together (that is, two parts cinabrese and the third white), make little loaves of them like half walnuts and leave them to dry. When you need some, take however much of it seems appropriate. And this pigment does you great credit if you use it for painting faces, hands, and nudes on walls..."

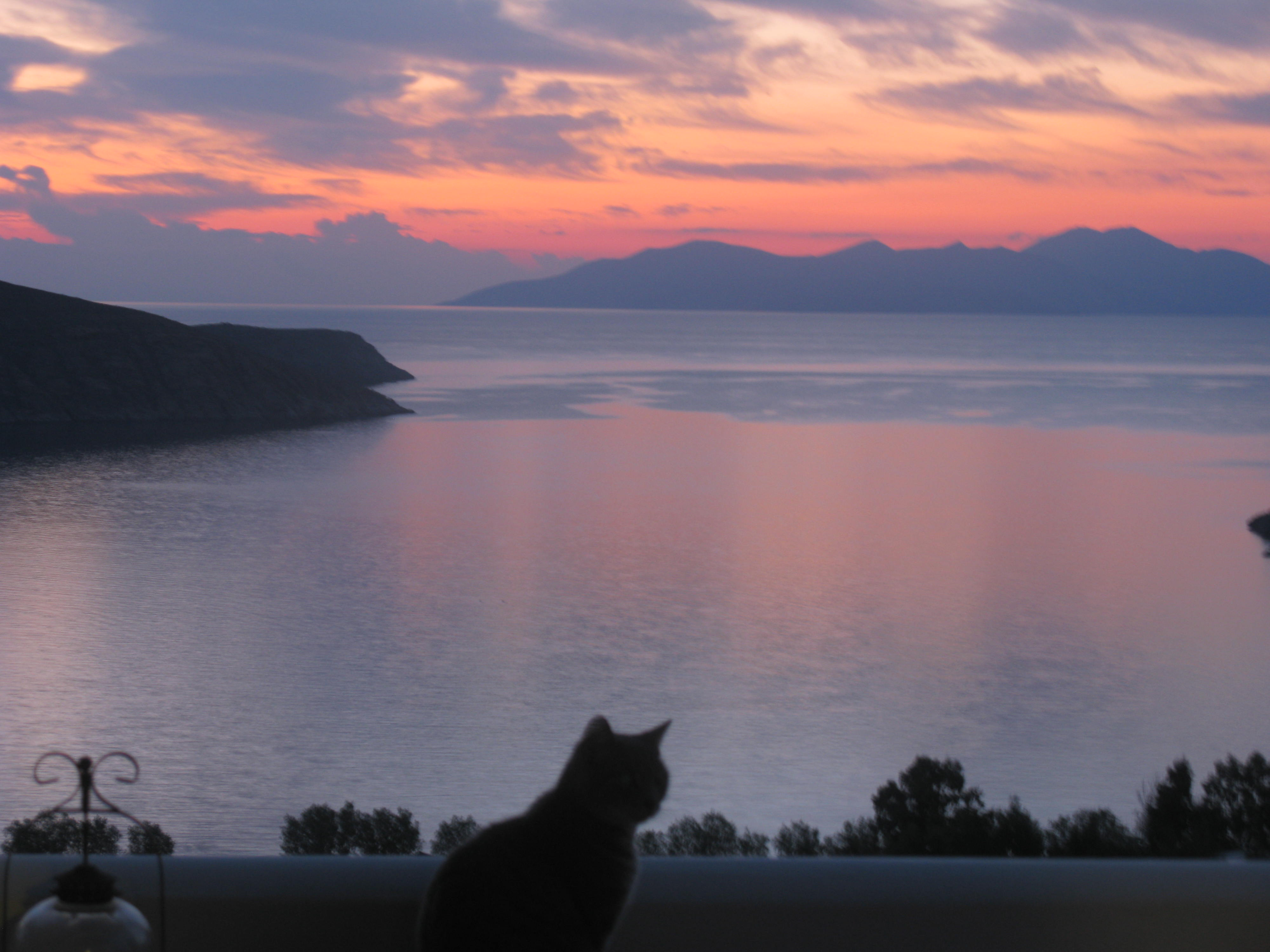
The Greek poet Homer wrote of "the child of morning, rose-fingered dawn" in the Odyssey. Sunrise at Serifos, Greece.

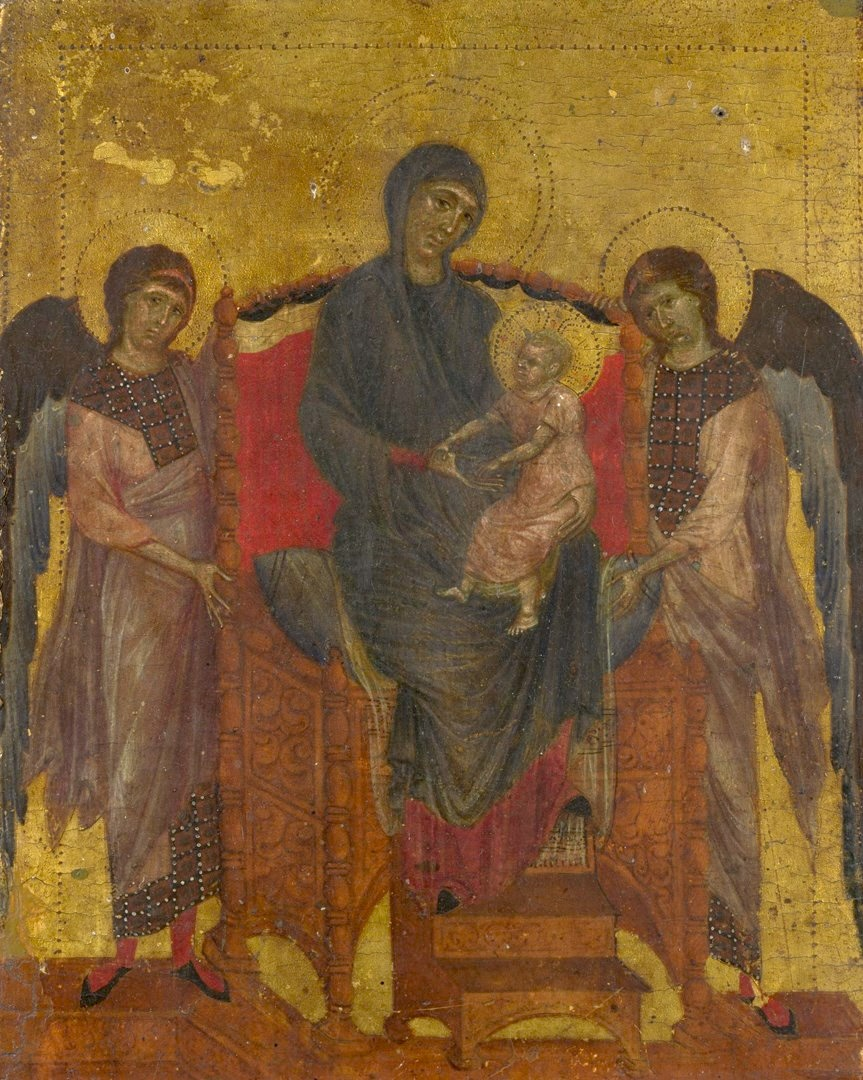
In the early Renaissance, the infant Jesus was sometimes shown dressed in pink, the color associated with the body of Christ. This is The Virgin and Child Enthroned with Two Angels, by Cimabue. (1265–1280)

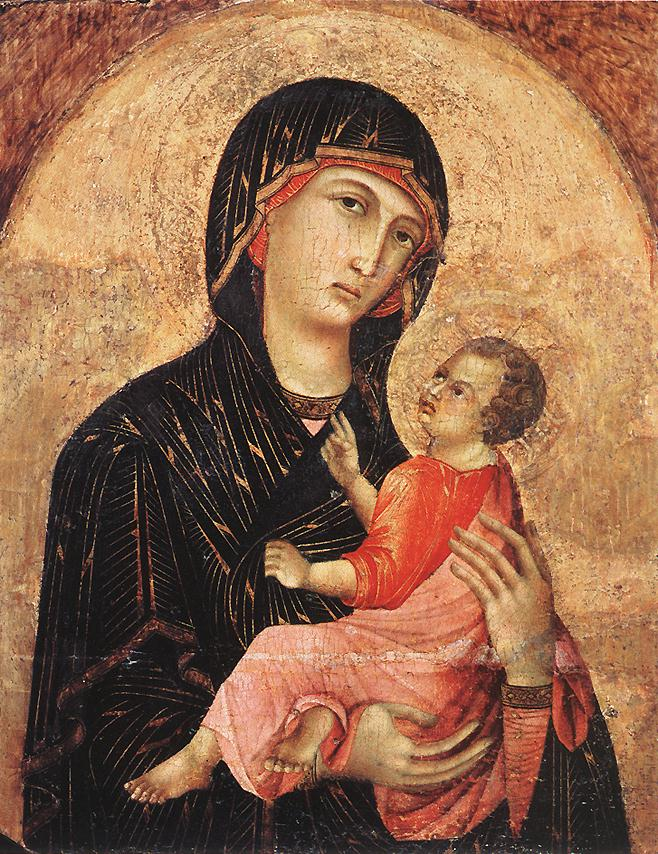
In the 1280s, Duccio also painted the Christ child dressed in pink

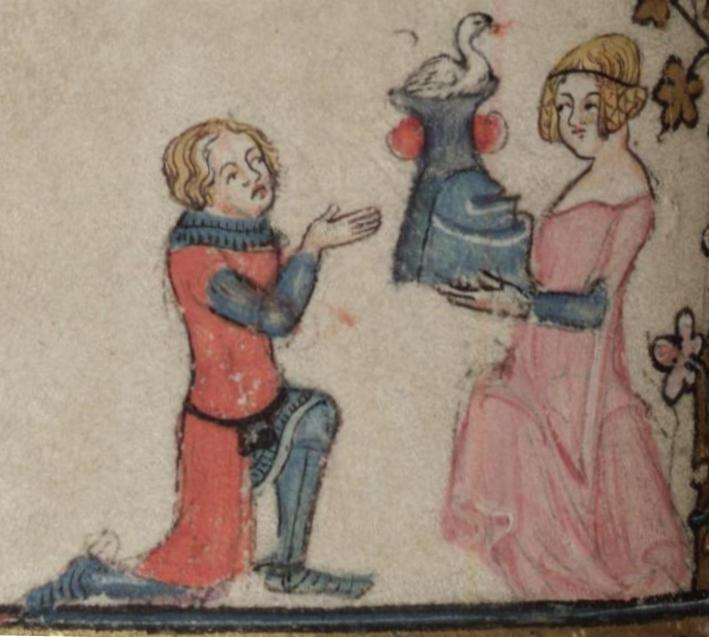
A knight in red receiving a helmet from a damsel in pink, from an English manuscript of The Romance of Alexander (1338–1344).

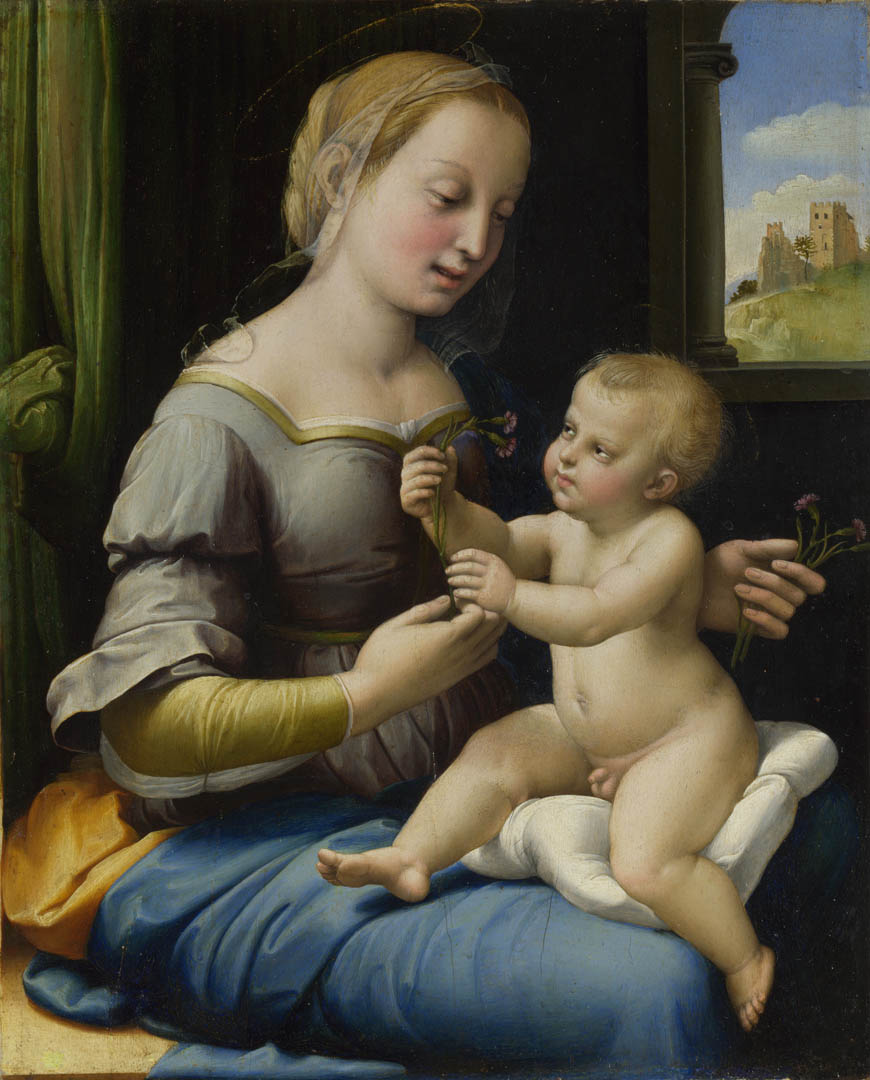
In the painting Madonna of the Pinks by Raphael, c. 1506–07, the Christ Child gives a pink flower to the Virgin Mary, symbolizing the union between the mother and child.

=== 18th century ===
Pink was particularly championed by Madame de Pompadour (1721–1764), the mistress of King Louis XV of France, who wore combinations of pale blue and pink, and had a particular tint of pink made for her by the Sevres porcelain factory, created by adding nuances of blue, black and yellow.

While pink was quite evidently the color of seduction in the portraits made by George Romney of Emma, Lady Hamilton, the future mistress of Admiral Horatio Nelson, in the late 18th century, it had the completely opposite meaning in the portrait of Sarah Barrett Moulton painted by Thomas Lawrence in 1794. In this painting, it symbolized childhood, innocence and tenderness. Sarah Moulton was just eleven years of age when the picture was painted, and died the following year.

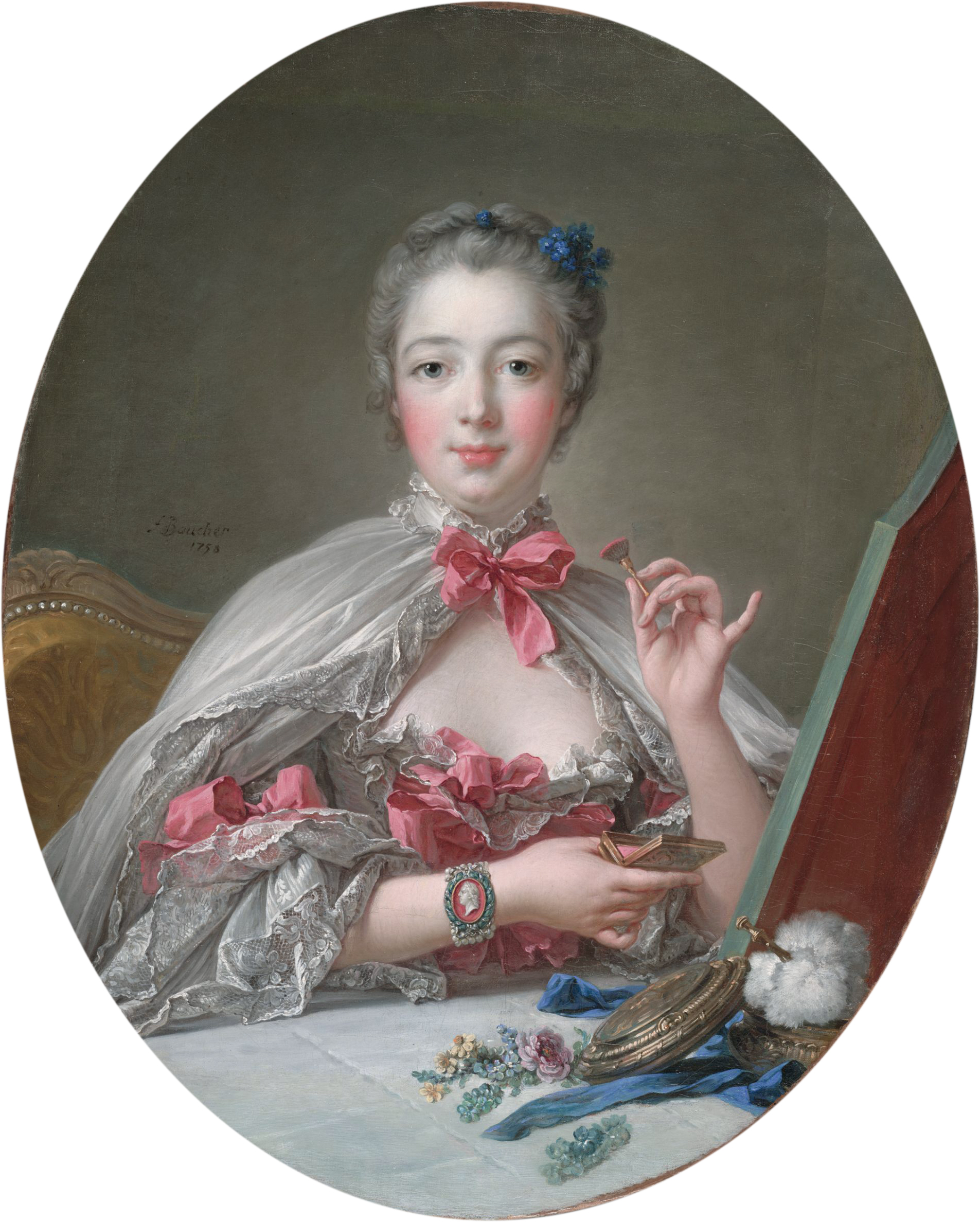
Madame de Pompadour, the mistress of Louis XV, made pink and blue the leading fashion colors in the Court of Versailles. She had a special pink tint created for her by the Sevres porcelain factory. This portrait by François Boucher was painted in 1758.

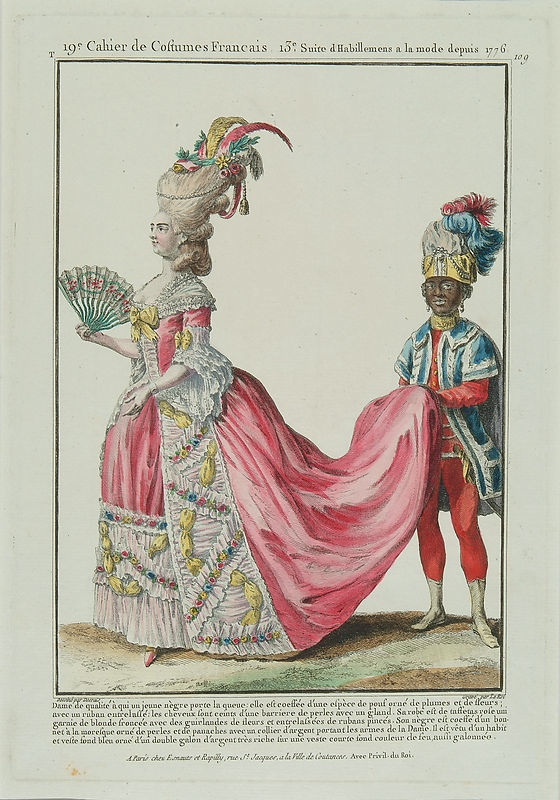
Pink had become a popular color throughout Europe by the late 18th century. It was associated with both romanticism and seduction. This fashion plate is from 1778 to 1787.

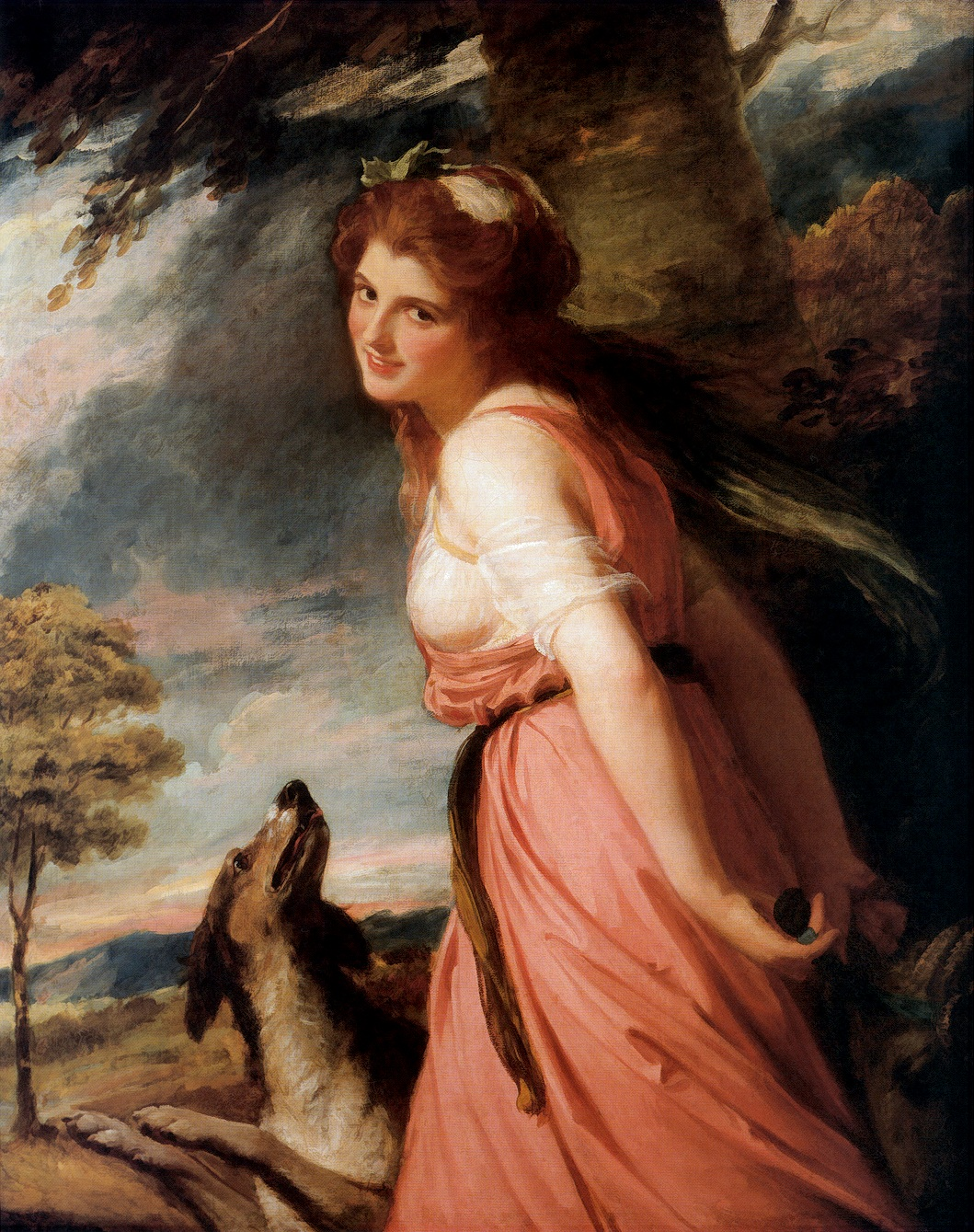
Emma, Lady Hamilton, later the mistress of Admiral Horatio Nelson, had herself painted by English painter George Romney posing as a Bacchante, dressed in pink. (1782–1784)

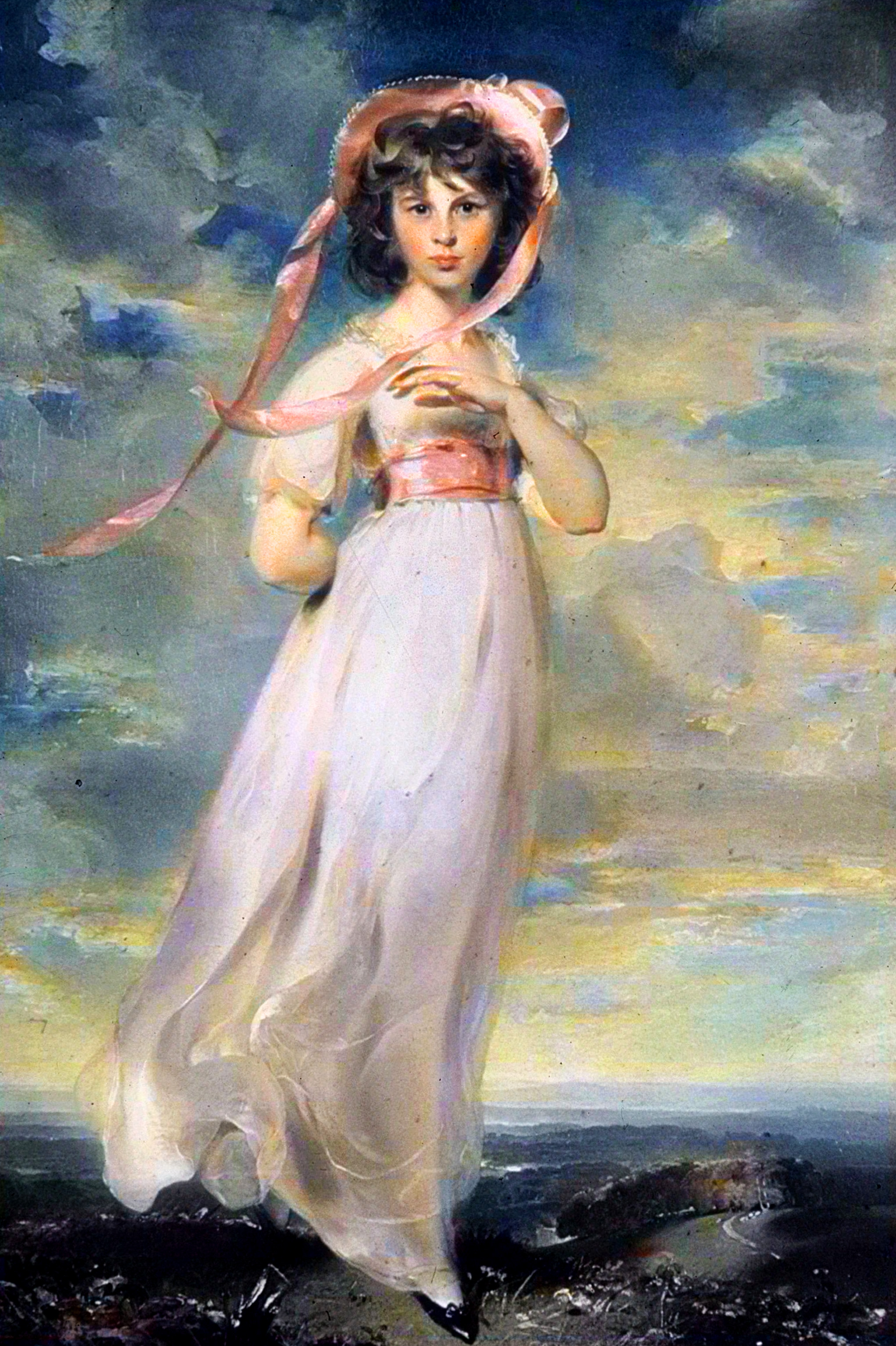
The portrait of Sarah Moulton, popularly known as "Pinkie", by Sir Thomas Lawrence (1794). Here pink represented youth, innocence and tenderness.

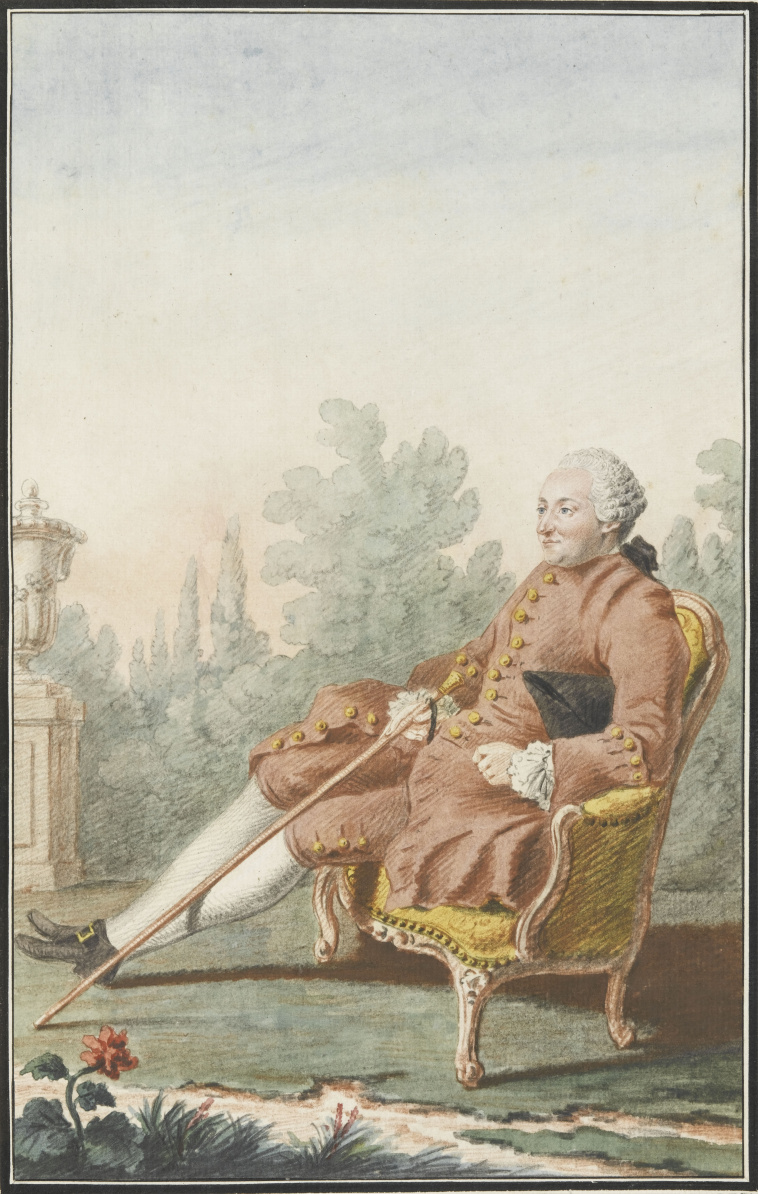
Paul-Henri Thiry, Baron d'Holbach by Louis Carmontelle. Pink was worn regardless of gender.

=== 19th century ===
In 19th century England, pink ribbons or decorations were often worn by young boys; boys were simply considered small men, and while men in England wore red uniforms, boys wore pink. The clothing for children in the 19th century was almost always white, since, before the invention of chemical dyes, clothing of any color would quickly fade when washed in boiling water. Queen Victoria was painted in 1850 with her seventh child and third son, Prince Arthur, who wore white and pink. Pink was also worn by young men, as seen in an 1863 painting by Charles Jalabert. In late nineteenth-century France, Impressionist painters working in a pastel color palette sometimes depicted women wearing the color pink, such as Edgar Degas' image of ballet dancers or Mary Cassatt's images of women and children.

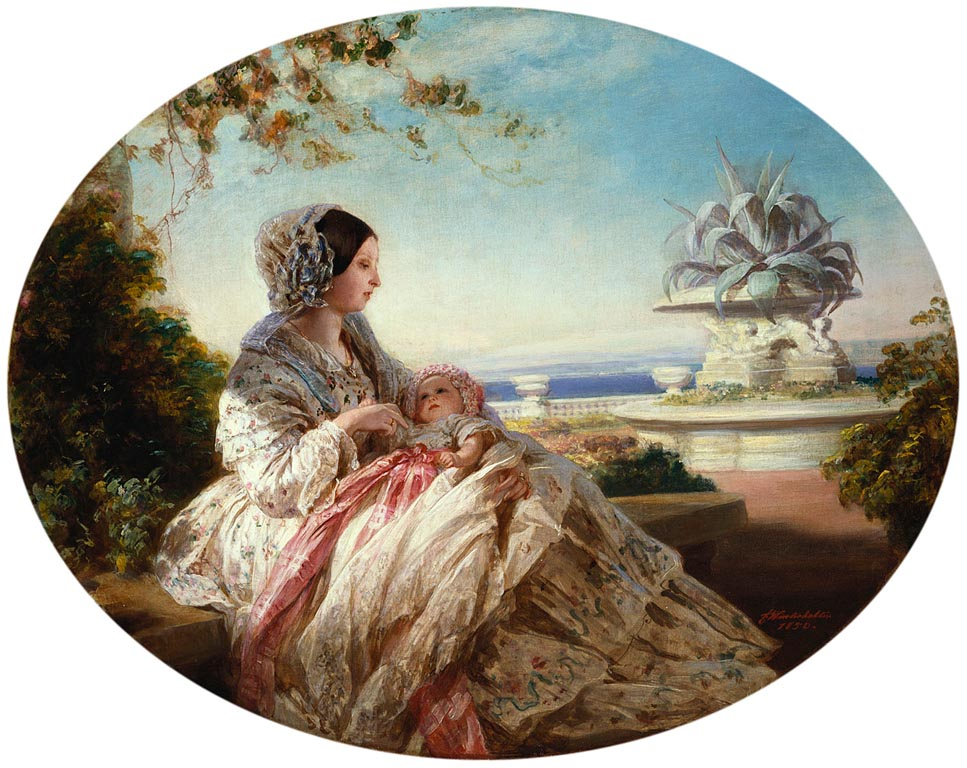
Queen Victoria in 1850 or 1851 with her third son and seventh child, Prince Arthur. In the 19th century, baby boys often wore white and pink. Pink was seen as a masculine color, while girls often wore white and blue.

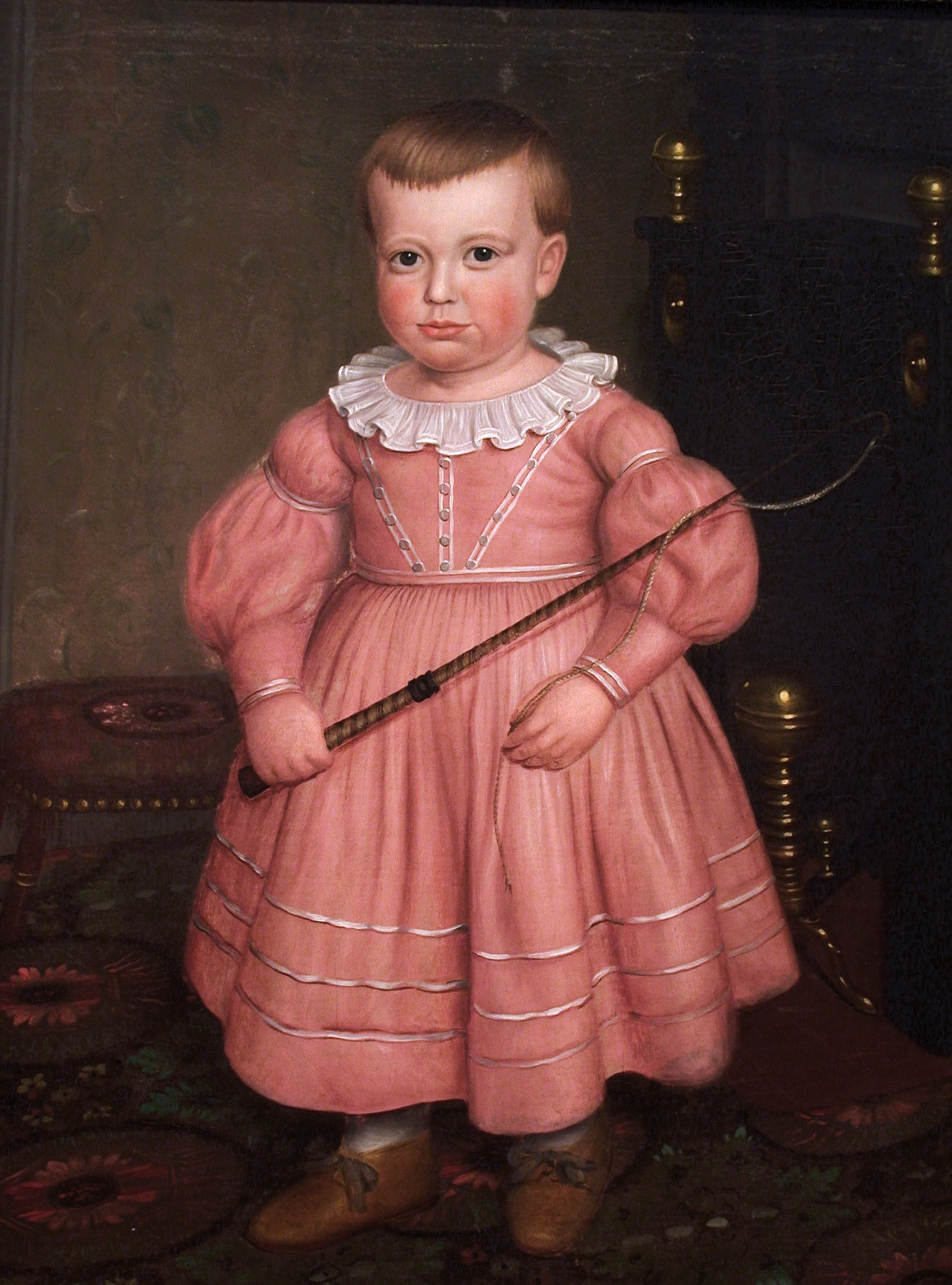
Young boy in pink, American school of painting (about 1840). Both girls and boys wore pink in the 19th century.

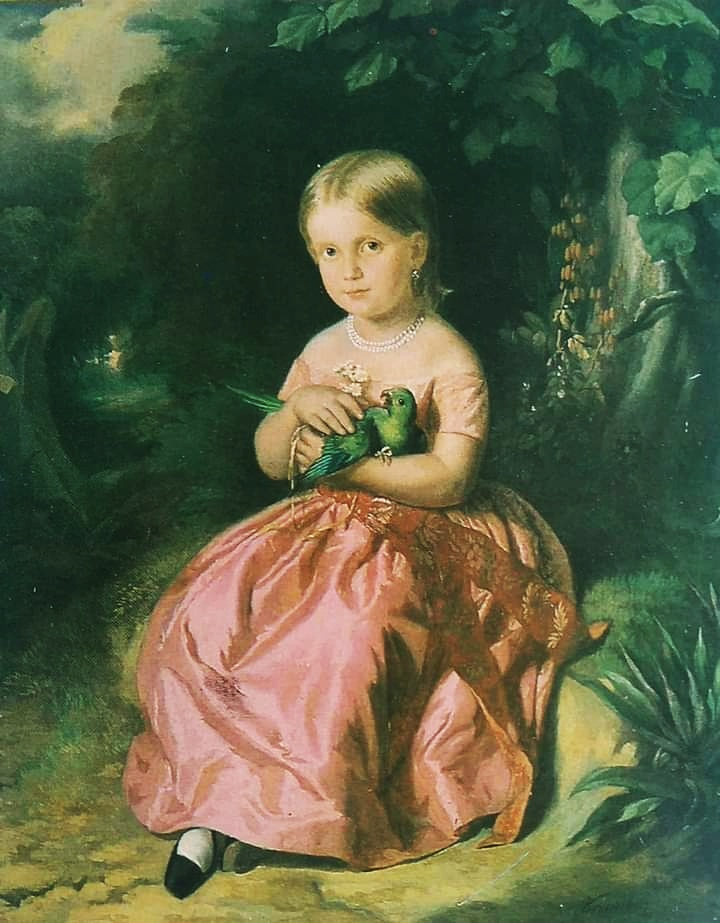
Princess Leopoldina of Brazil in pink gown (1853)

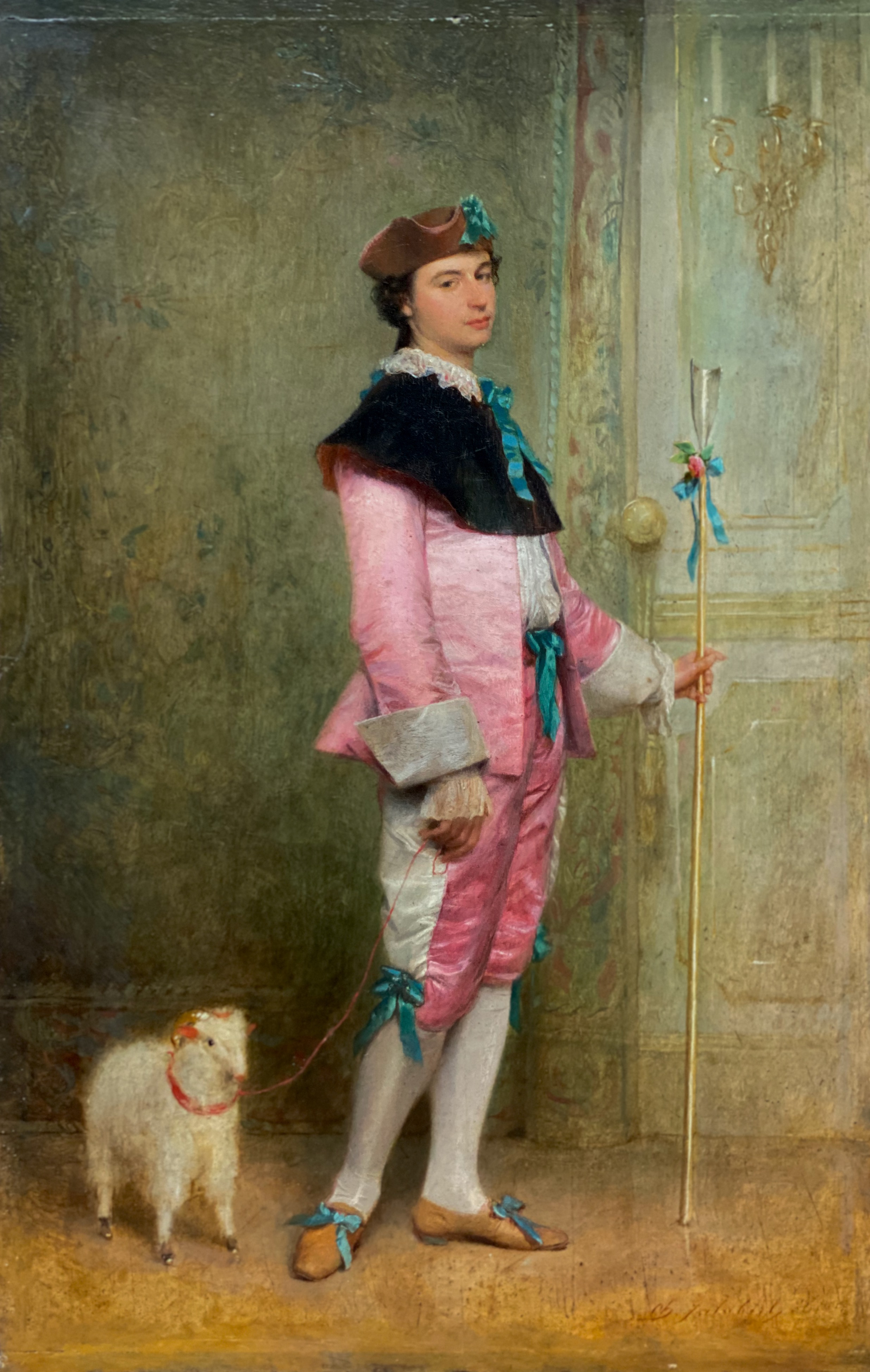
Souvenir de carnaval Charles Jalabert 1863

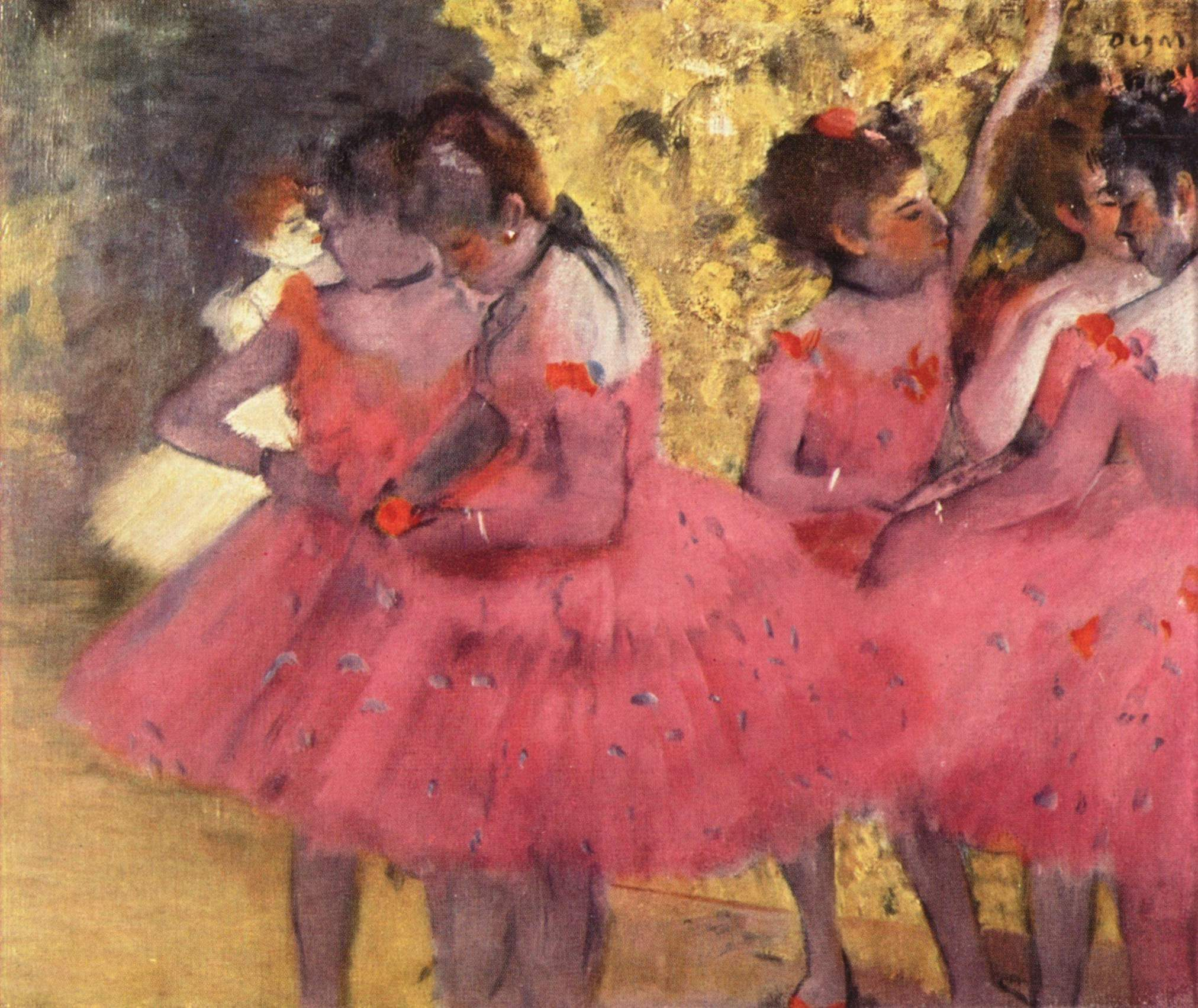
Dancers in pink, between scenes. Edgar Degas

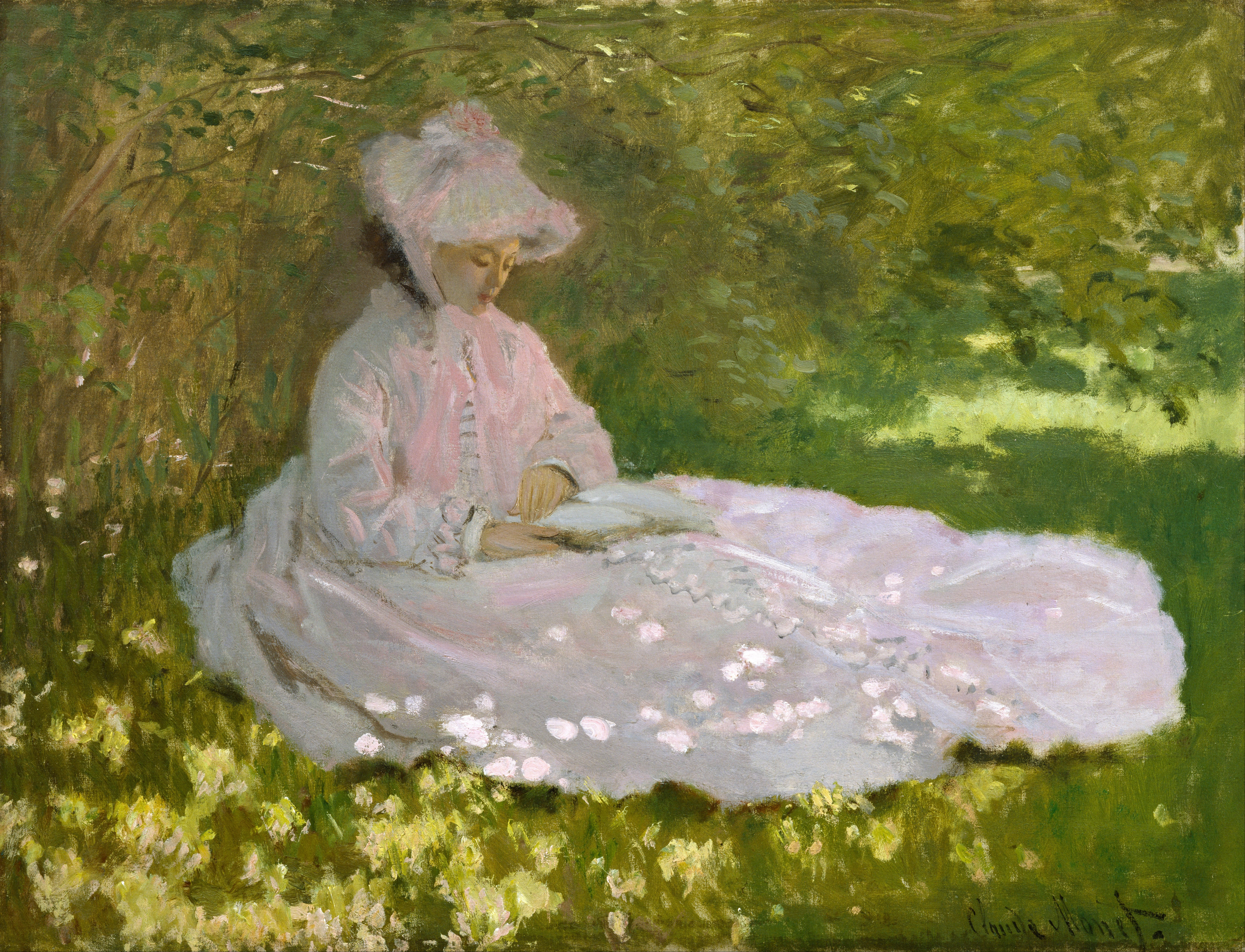
The Impressionist painter Claude Monet used pink, blue and green to capture the effects of light and shadows on a white dress in Springtime (1872).

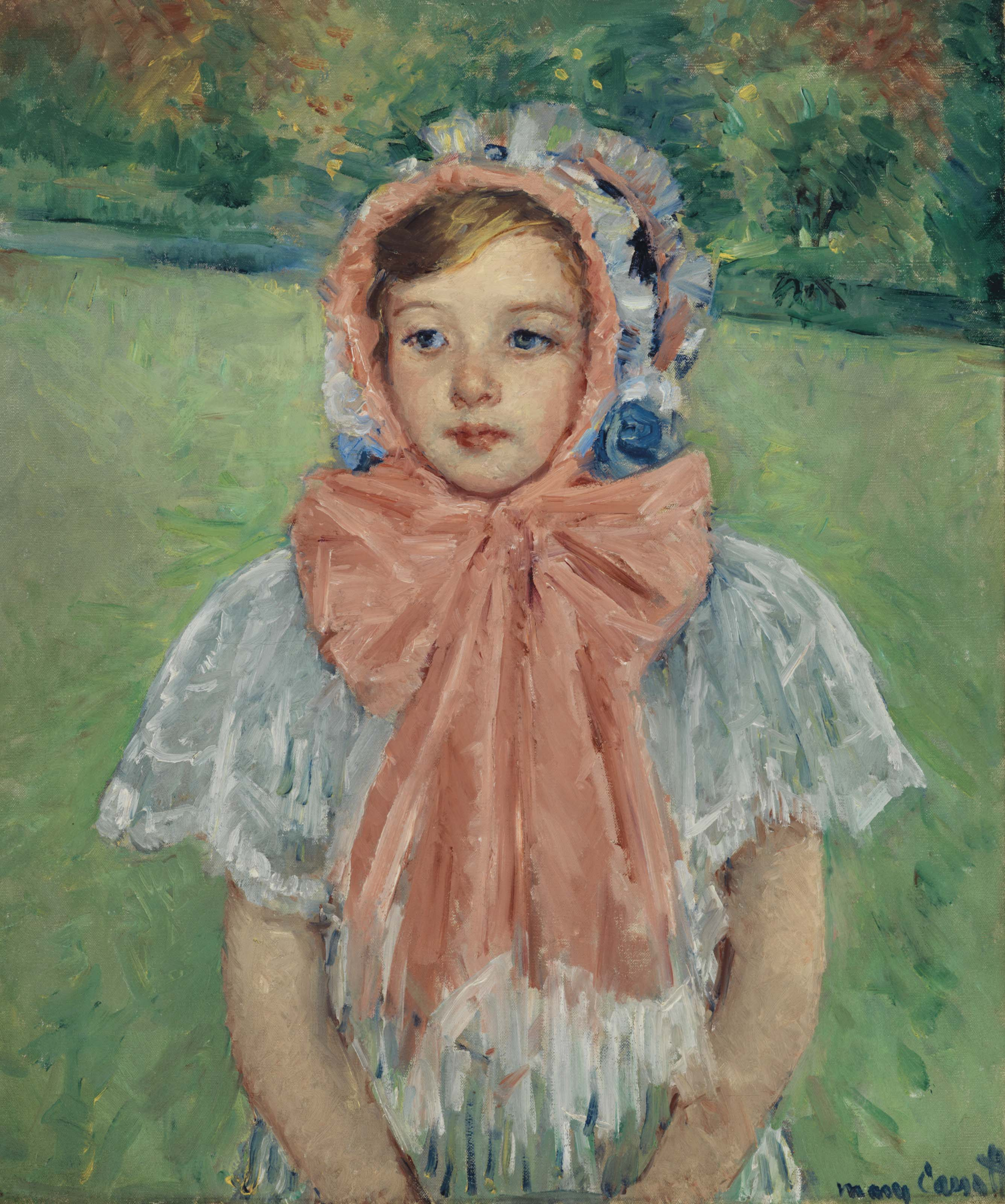
Mary Cassatt, Girl in a Bonnet Tied with a Large Pink Bow, 1909. Oil on canvas (68 x 57.2 cm). Private Collection.

=== 20th and 21st centuries ===
A dress parade, held in 1949, at the famous Waldorf-Astoria Hotel in New York, caused a stir among attendees due to the vibrant pink tones in the dresses and garments. The journalists and critics of the time, seeking to know Mexican designer Ramón Valdiosera's inspiration, asked him about the origin of the color. The artist simply replied that that pink was already part of Mexican culture, which the New York fashion critic Perle Mesta then described as Mexican Pink.

The First inauguration of Dwight D. Eisenhower (1953), when Eisenhower's wife Mamie Eisenhower wore a pink dress as her inaugural gown, is thought to have been a key turning point in the association of pink as a color associated with girls. Mamie's strong liking of pink led to the public association with pink being a color that "ladylike women wear." The 1957 American musical Funny Face also played a role in cementing the color's association with women.

In the 20th century, pinks became bolder, brighter, and more assertive, partly because of the invention of chemical dyes that did not fade. The pioneer in the creation of the new wave of pinks was the Italian designer Elsa Schiaparelli (1890–1973), who was aligned with the artists of the surrealist movement, including Jean Cocteau. In 1931 she created a new variety of the color, called shocking pink, made by mixing magenta with a small amount of white. She launched a perfume called Shocking, sold in a bottle in the shape of a woman's torso, said to be modelled on that of Mae West. Her fashions, co-designed with artists like Cocteau, featured the new pinks.

In Nazi Germany in the 1930s and 1940s, inmates of Nazi concentration camps who were accused of homosexuality were forced to wear a pink triangle. Because of this, the pink triangle has become a symbol of the modern gay rights movement.

The transition to pink as a sexually differentiating color for girls occurred gradually, through the selective process of the marketplace, in the 1930s and 40s. In the 1920s, some groups had described pink as a masculine color, an equivalent to red, which was considered for men but lighter for boys. But stores nonetheless found that people were increasingly choosing to buy pink for girls, and blue for boys, until this became an accepted norm in the 1940s.

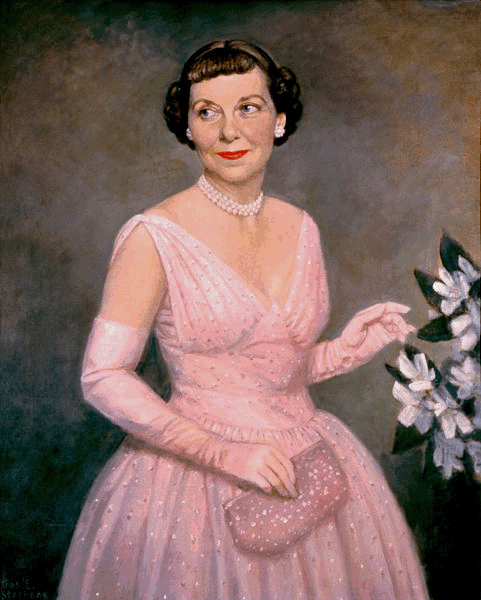
Mamie Eisenhower in her pink inaugural gown, painted in 1953 by Thomas Stevens

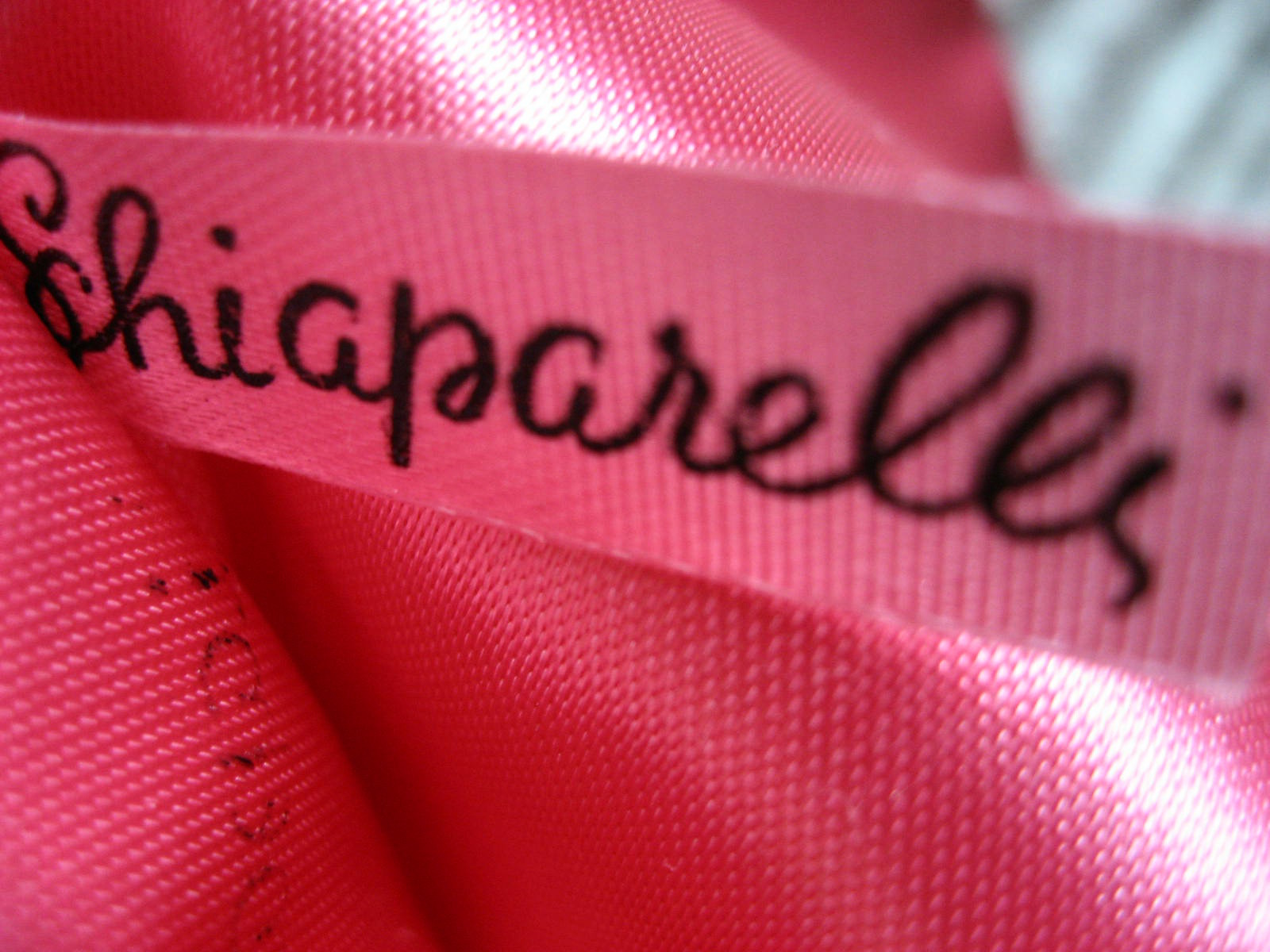
Shocking pink, a mix of magenta with a little white, was the signature color of Italian fashion designer Elsa Schiaparelli.

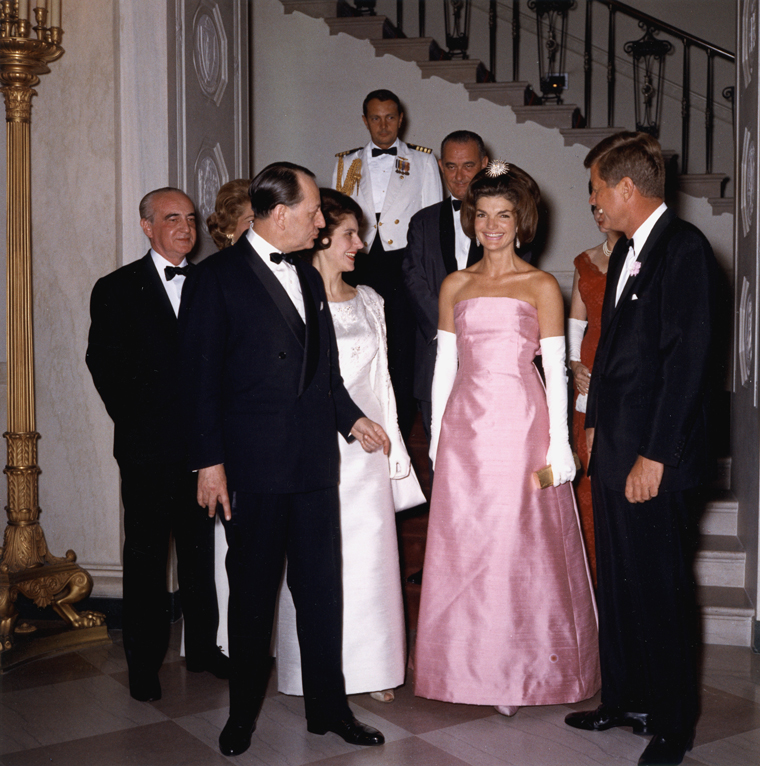
Jacqueline Kennedy, the wife of President John F. Kennedy, made pink a popular high-fashion color.

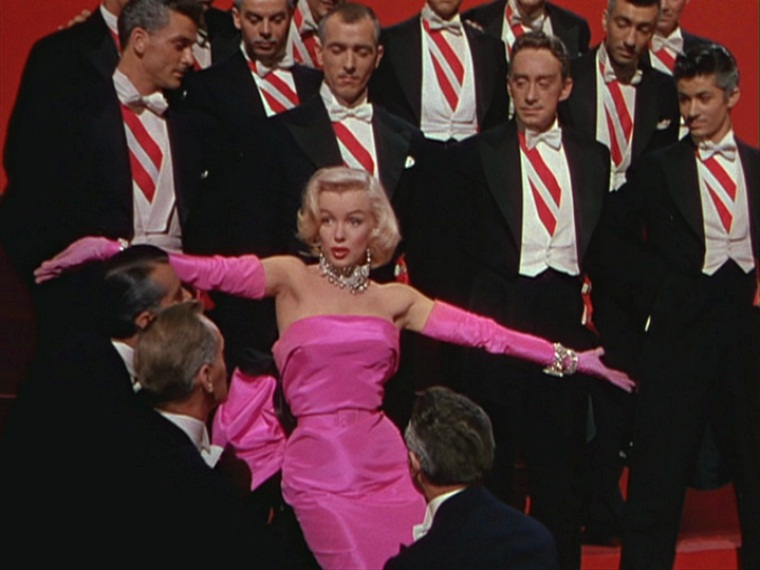
Pink combined with black or violet is associated with seduction. Marilyn Monroe in the trailer for the film Gentlemen Prefer Blondes (1953).

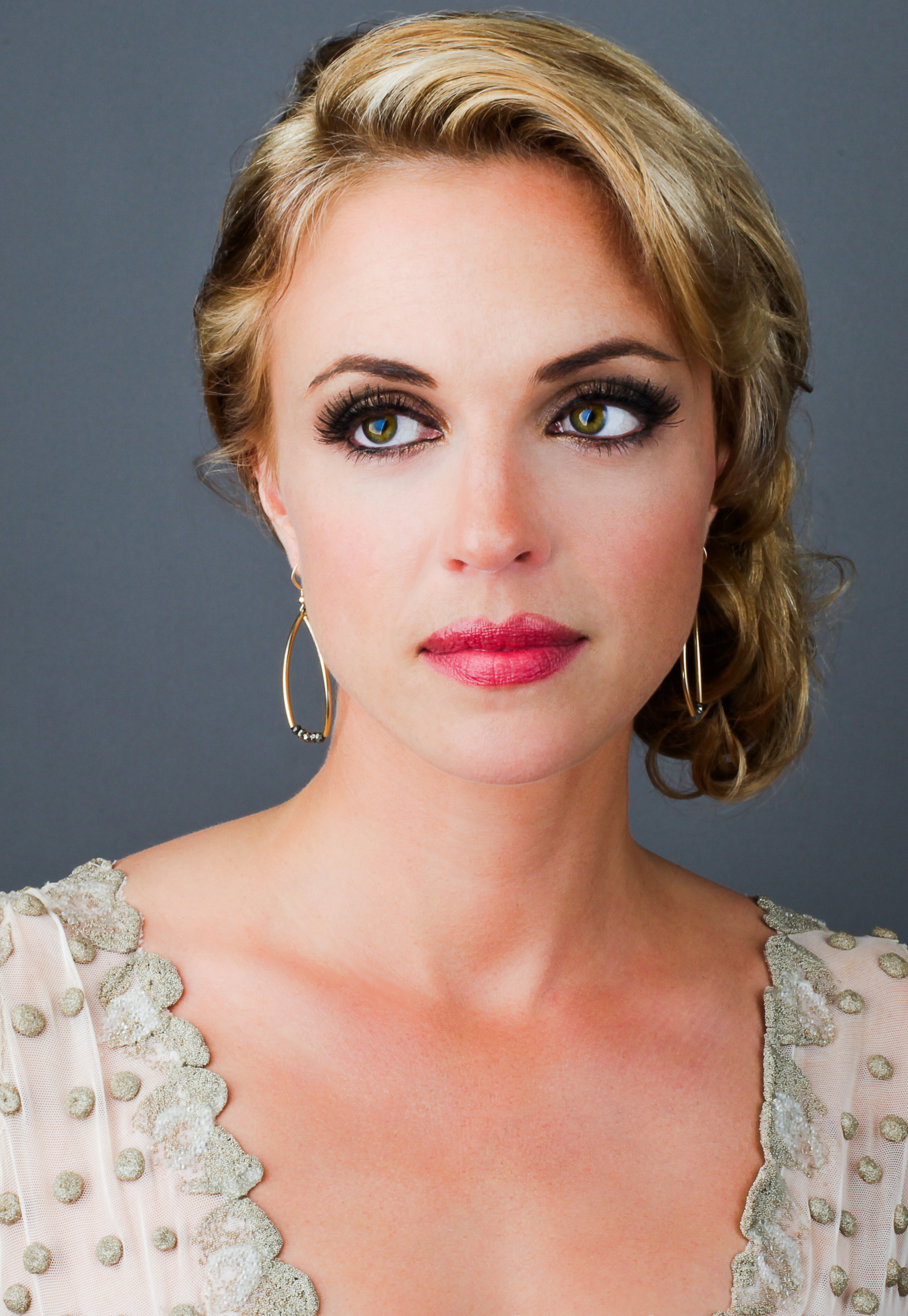
Pink lipstick is thought to attract attention and harmonize with flesh colors, clothes, and fashion accessories.

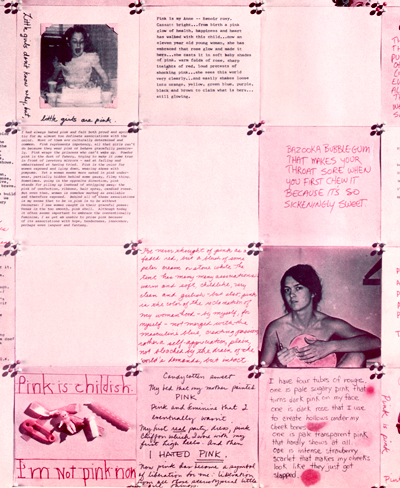
Detail of "Pink," a poster created by Sheila de Bretteville in 1973. It was meant to explore the notions of gender associated with the color pink for an American Institute of Graphic Arts exhibition about color.

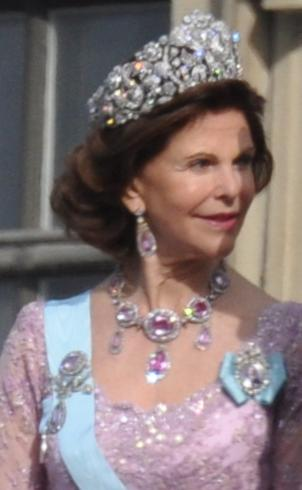
Queen Silvia of Sweden wearing a pink dress and the Pink Topaz Demi-Parure paired with a diamond tiara, 2010

== In nature and culture ==
Various shades of pink

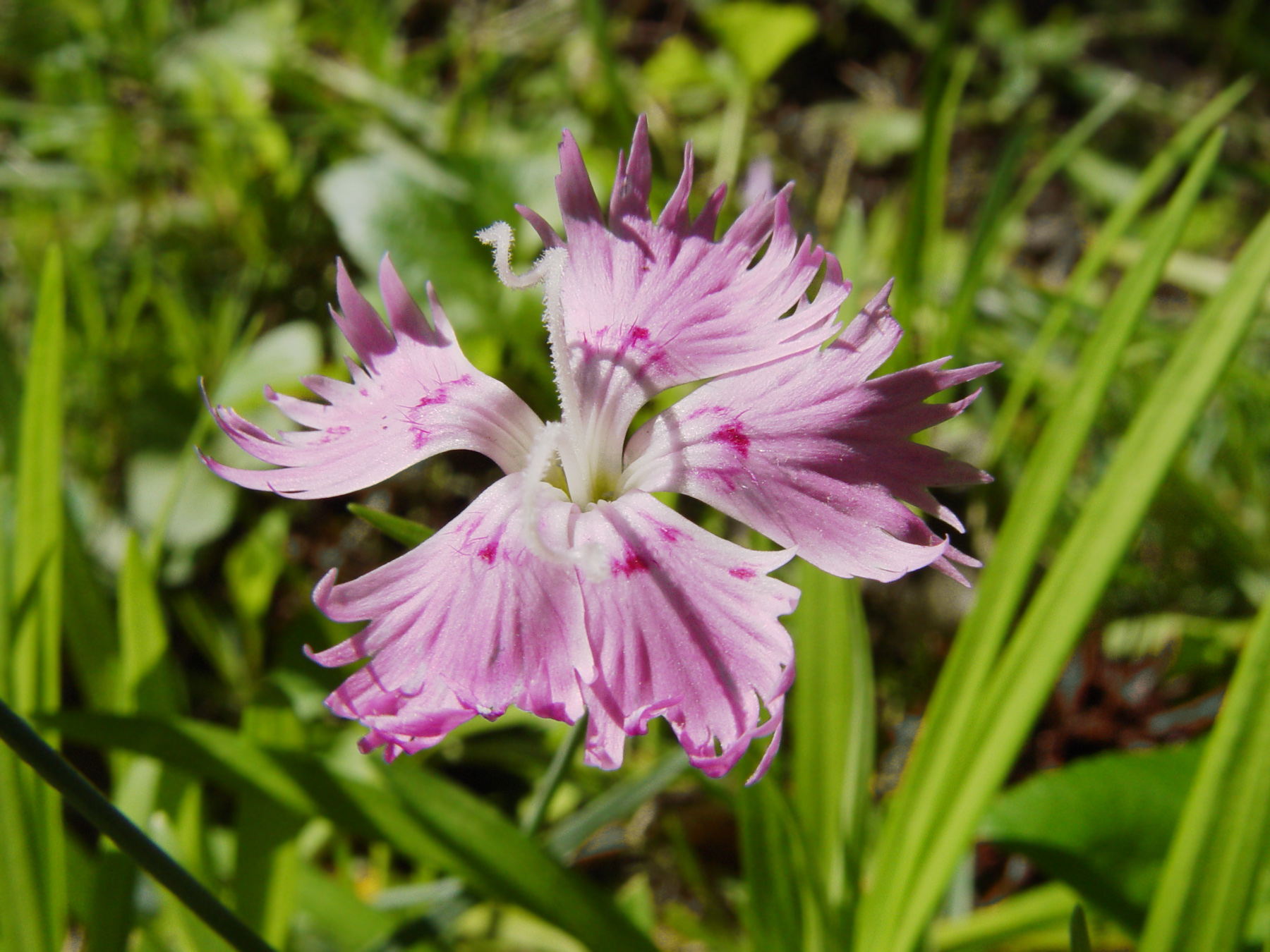
The color pink takes its name from the flowers called pinks, members of the genus Dianthus.

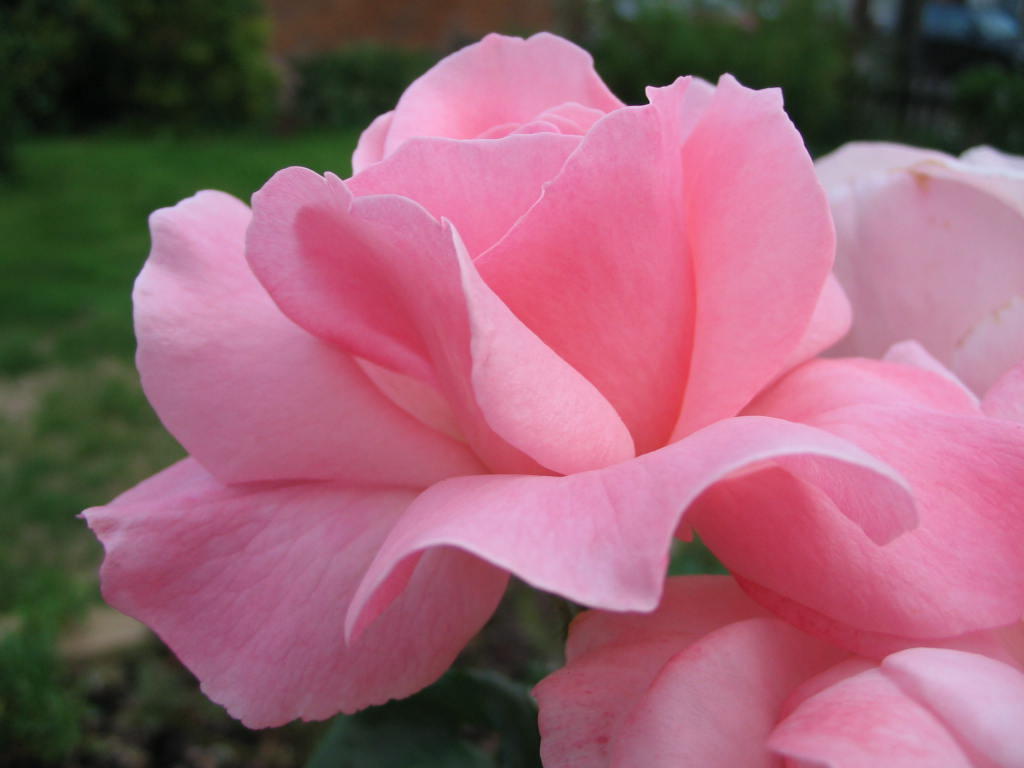
In most European languages, pink is known as rose or rosa, after the rose flower.

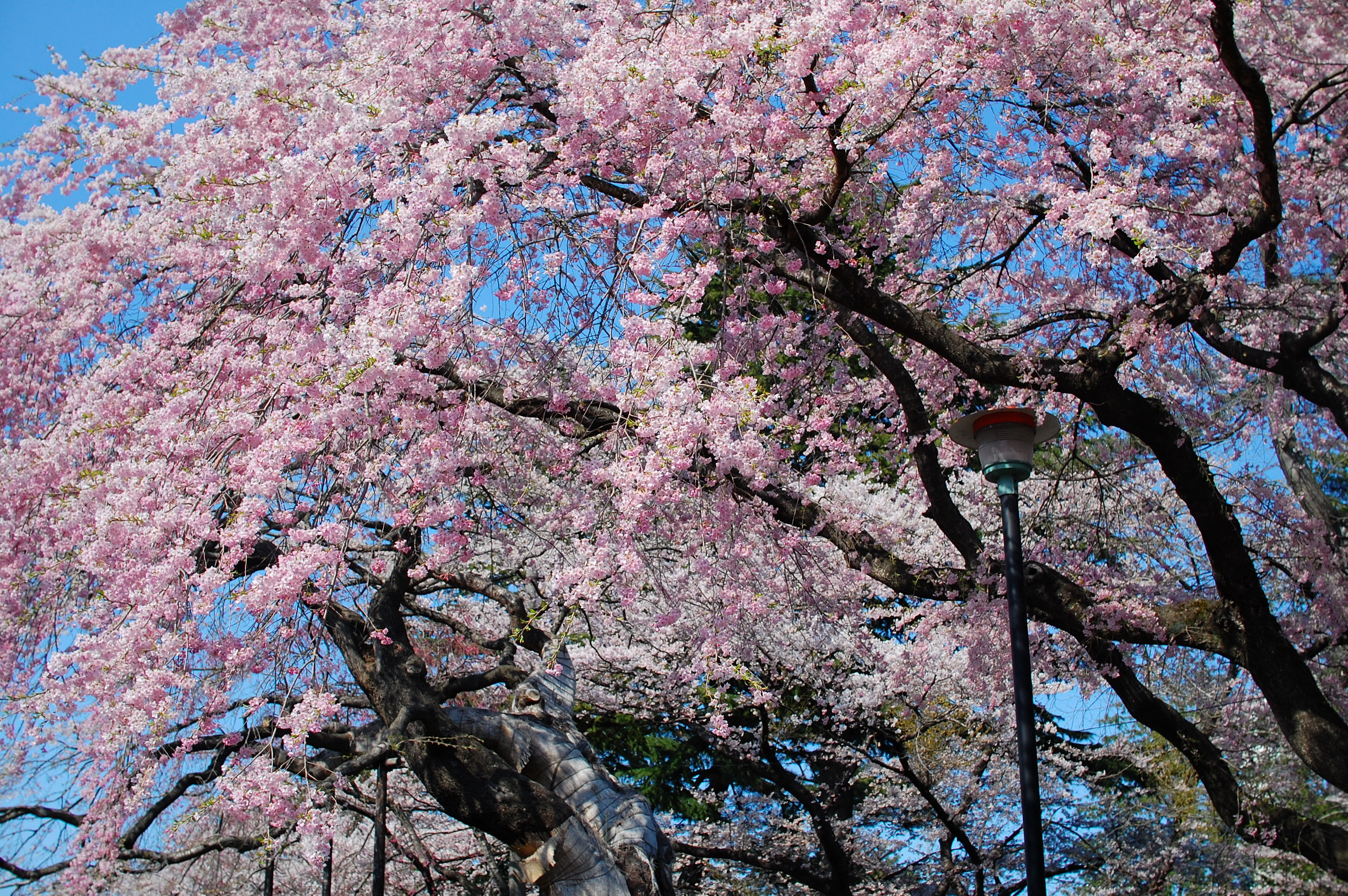
Cherry blossoms in Sendai, Miyagi, Japan. In Japanese the word for cherry blossom pink is (sakura-iro), and peach blossoms (momo-iro).

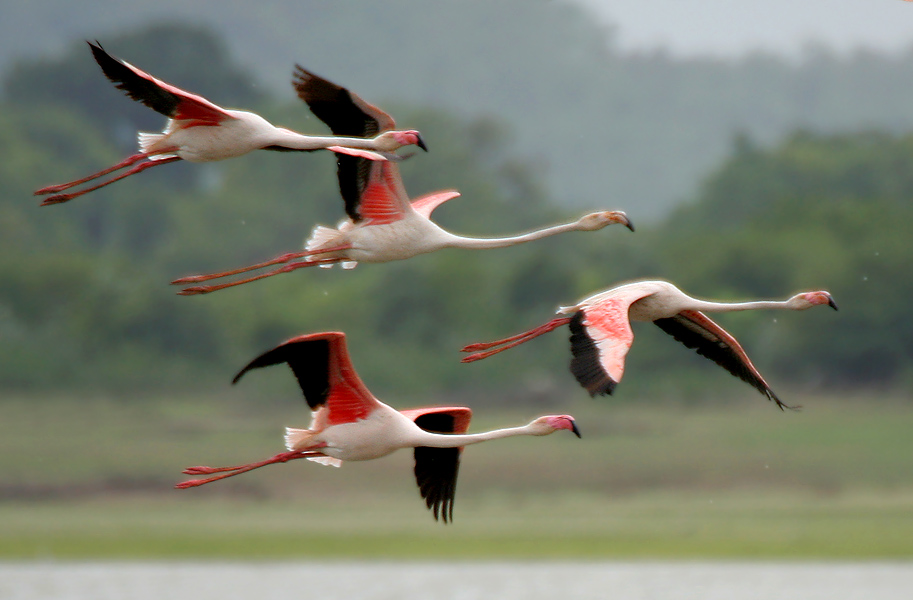
Greater pink flamingoes in flight over Pocharam Lake in Andhra Pradesh, India.

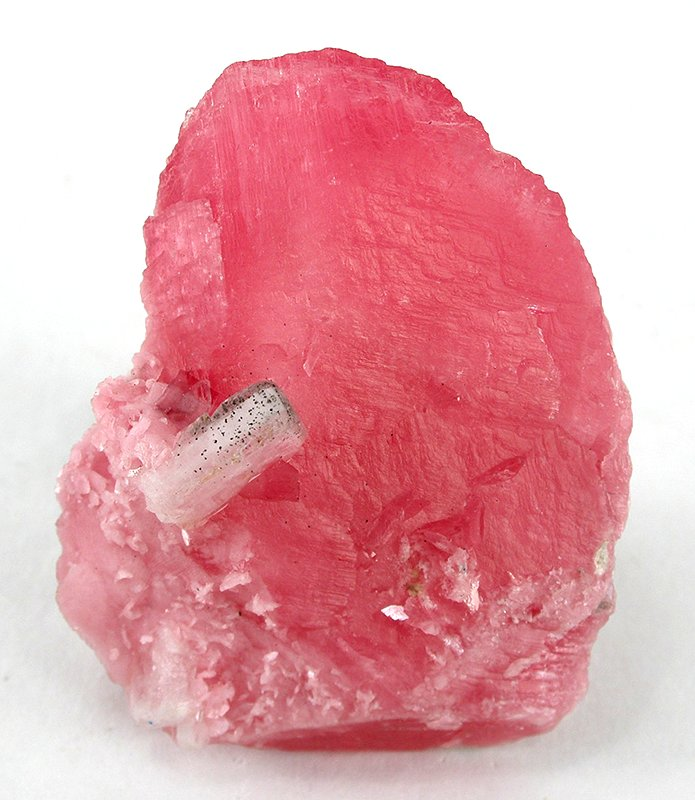
Rhodochrosite is one of the many pink gemstones.

=== Pigments - Pinke ===
In the 17th century, the word pink or pinke was also used to describe a yellowish pigment, which was mixed with blue colors to yield greenish colors. Thomas Jenner's A Book of Drawing, Limning, Washing (1652) categorises "Pink & blew bice" amongst the greens (p. 38), and specifies several admixtures of greenish colors made with pink—e.g. "Grasse-green is made of Pink and Bice, it is shadowed with Indigo and Pink ... French-green of Pink and Indico [shadowed with] Indico" (pp. 38–40). In William Salmon's Polygraphice (1673), "Pink yellow" is mentioned amongst the chief yellow pigments (p. 96), and the reader is instructed to mix it with either Saffron or Ceruse for "sad" or "light" shades thereof, respectively.

=== Plants and flowers ===
Pink is one of the most common colors of flowers; it serves to attract the insects and birds necessary for pollination and perhaps also to deter predators. The color comes from natural pigments called anthocyanins, which also provide the pink in raspberries.

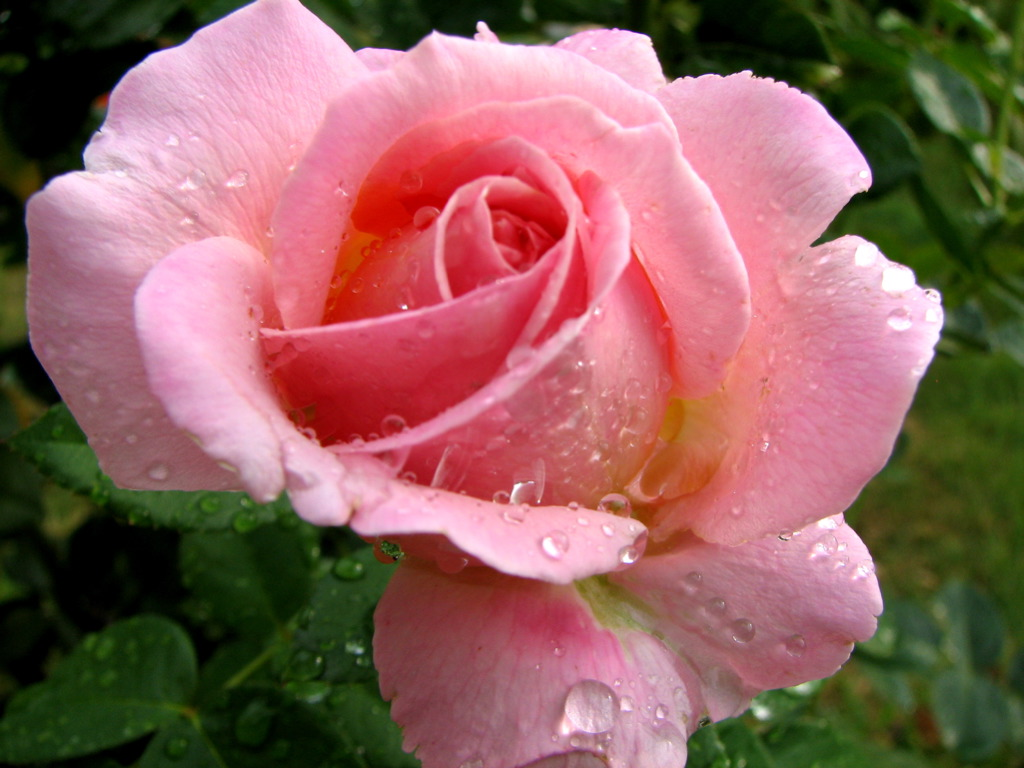
A pink rose in the rain.

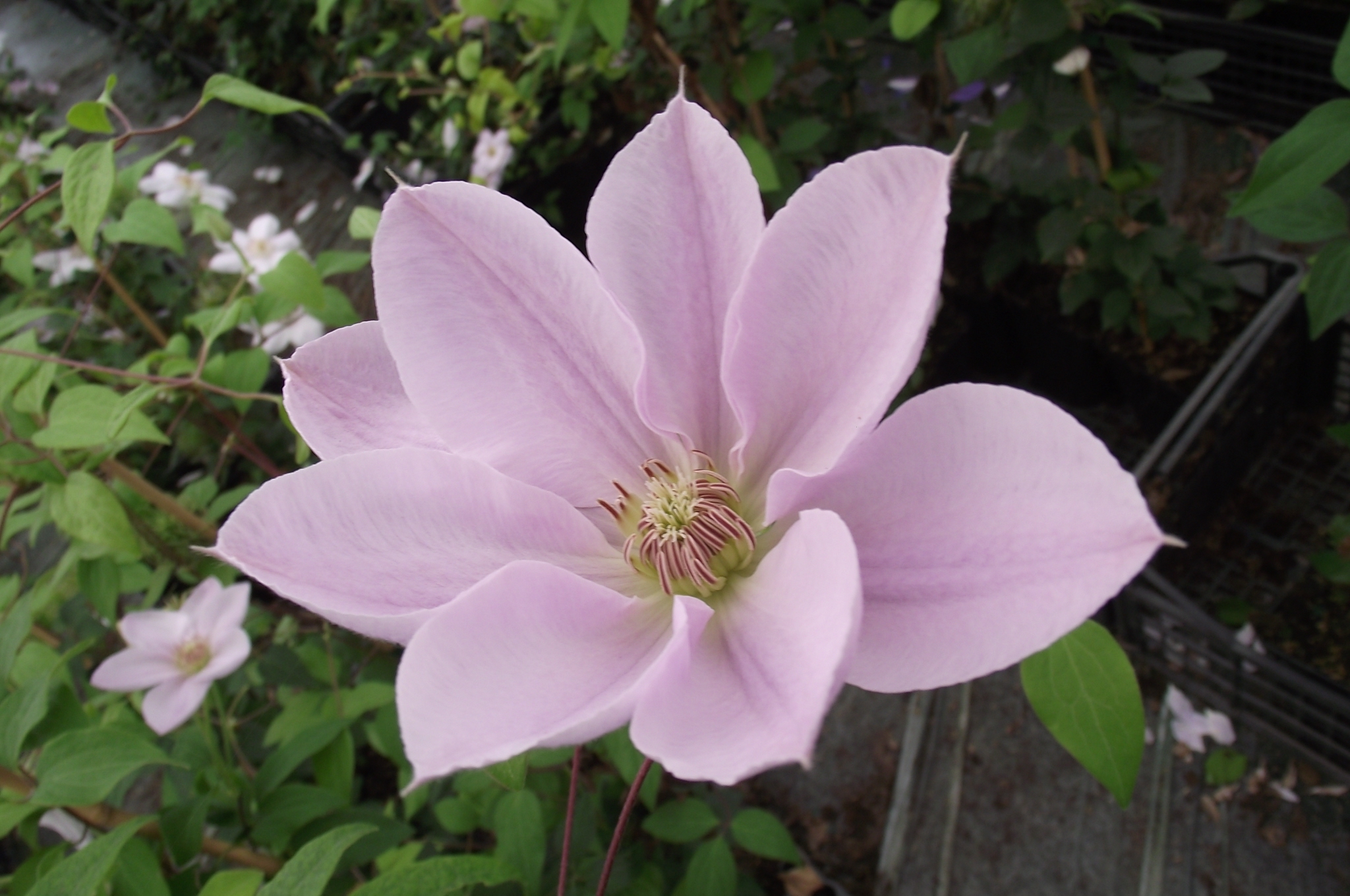
A clematis Chantilly.

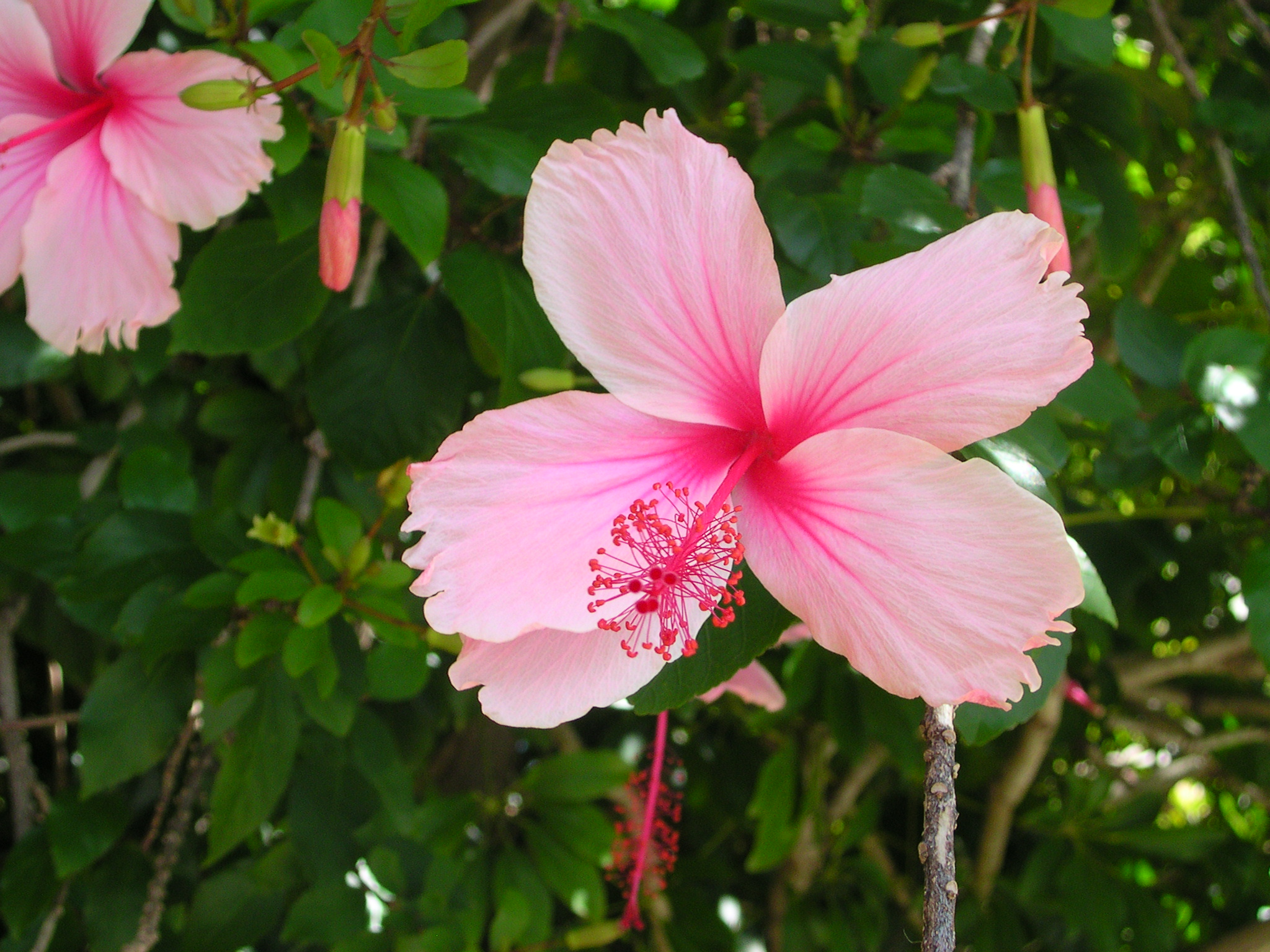
A pink hibiscus from Australia.

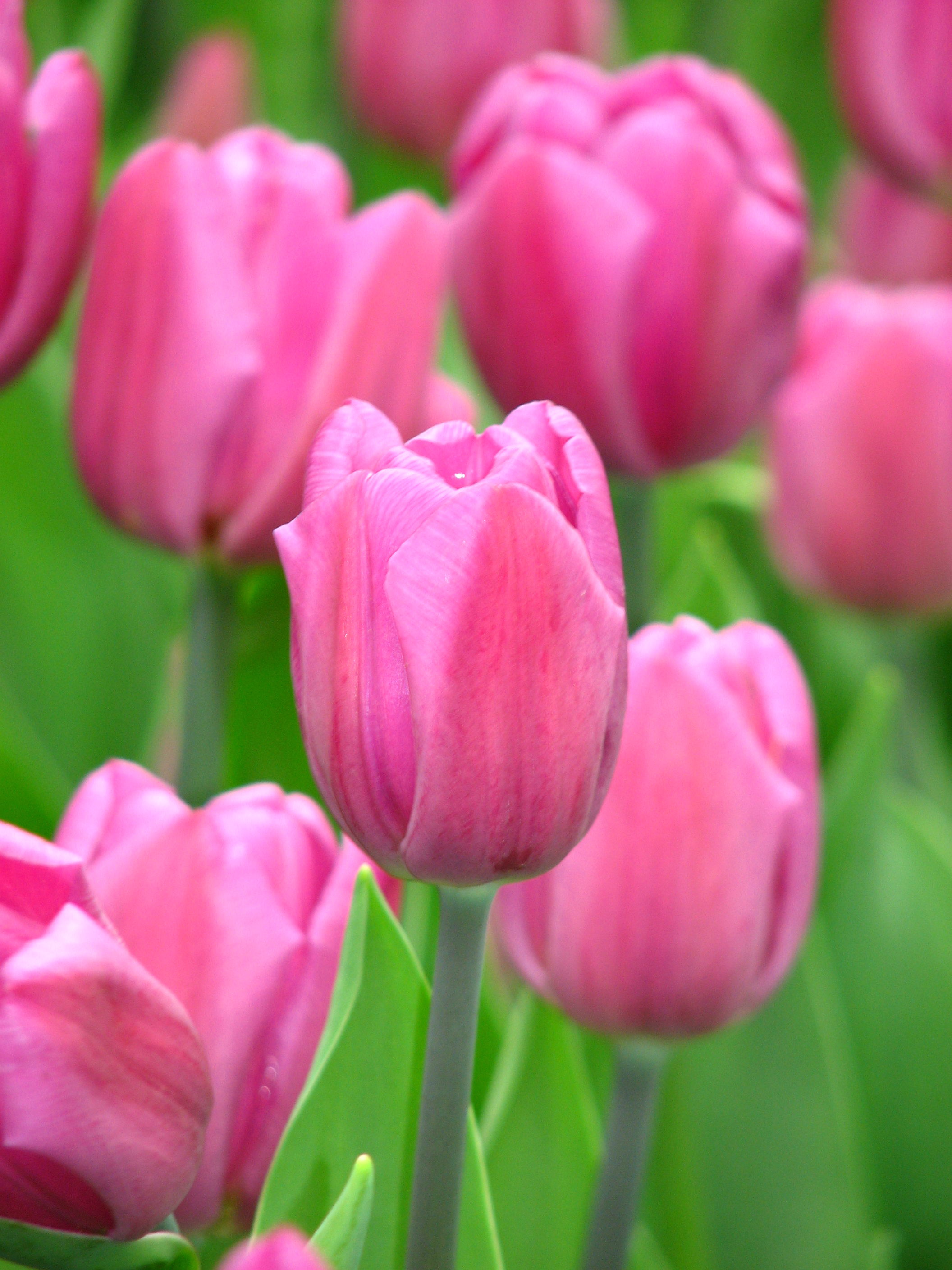
Pink tulips in the botanical gardens of Moscow State University.

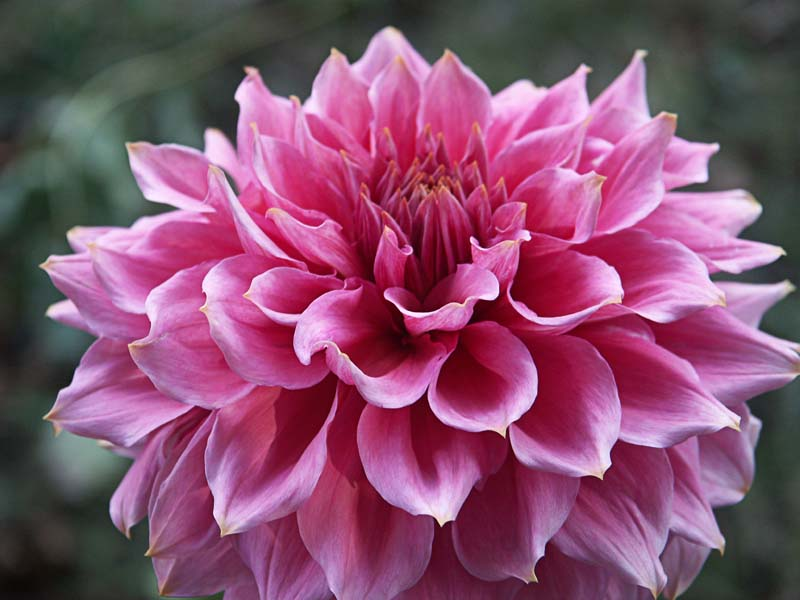
A pink dahlia

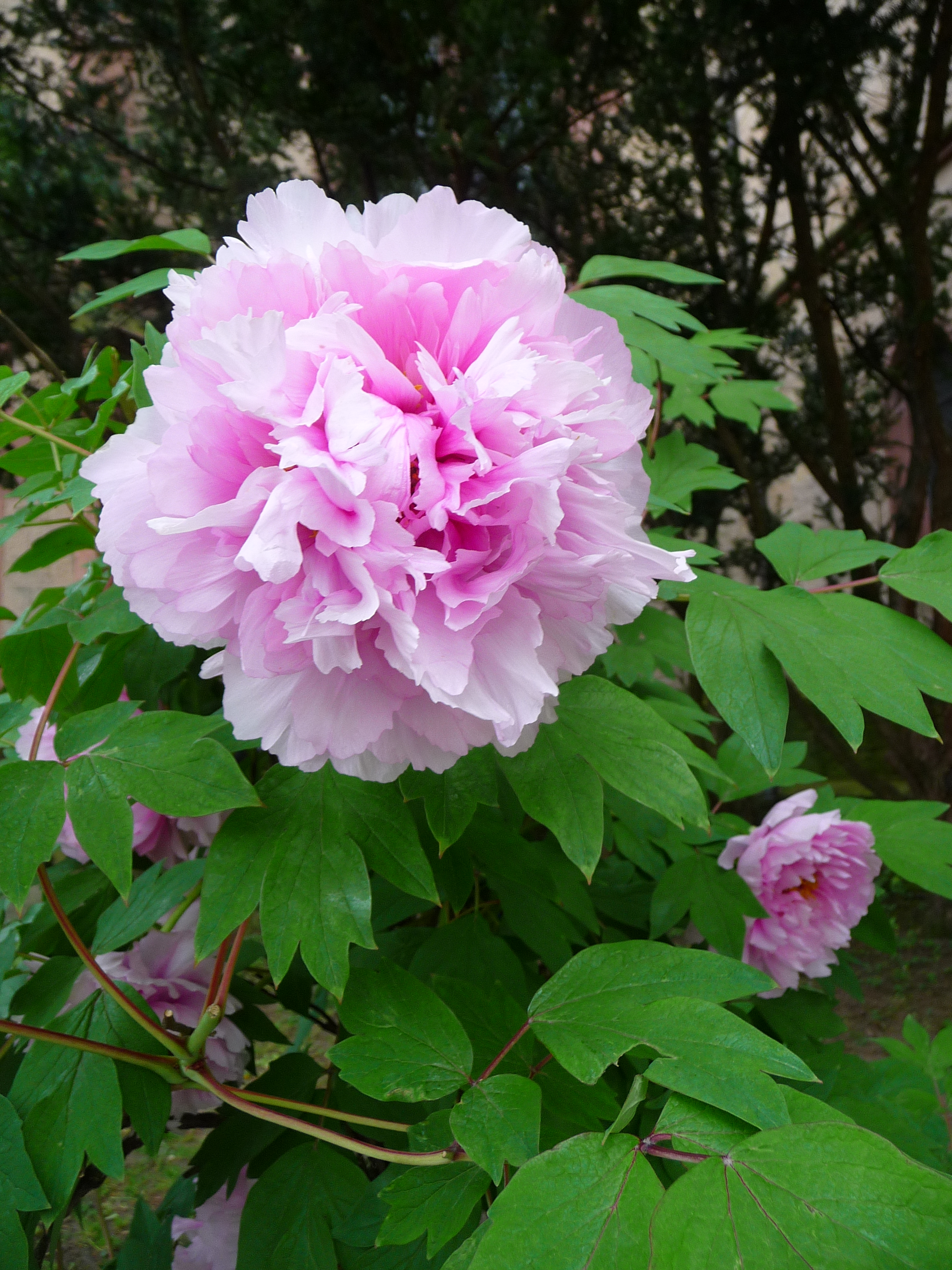
A pink peony.

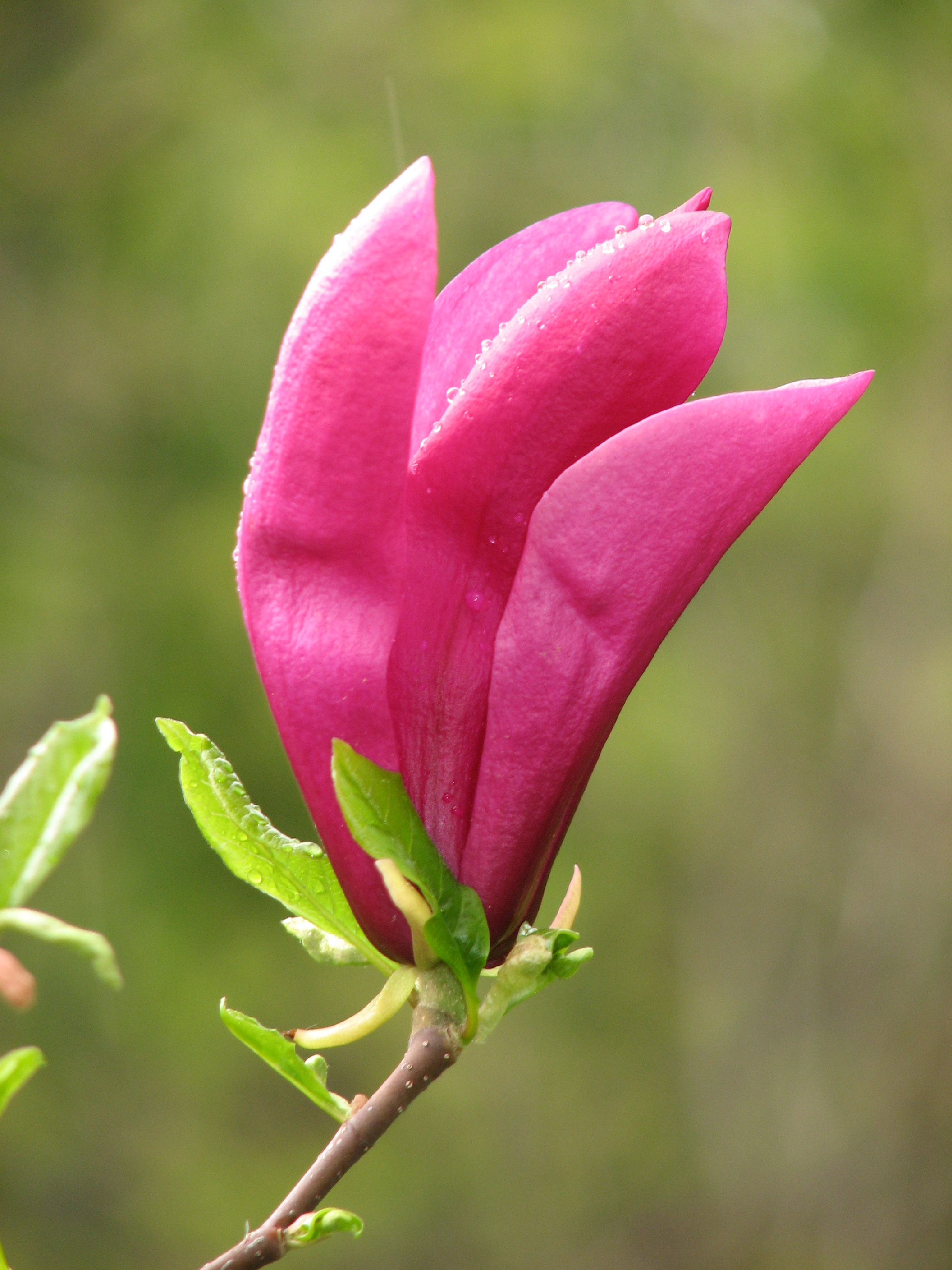
A flower of a magnolia tree

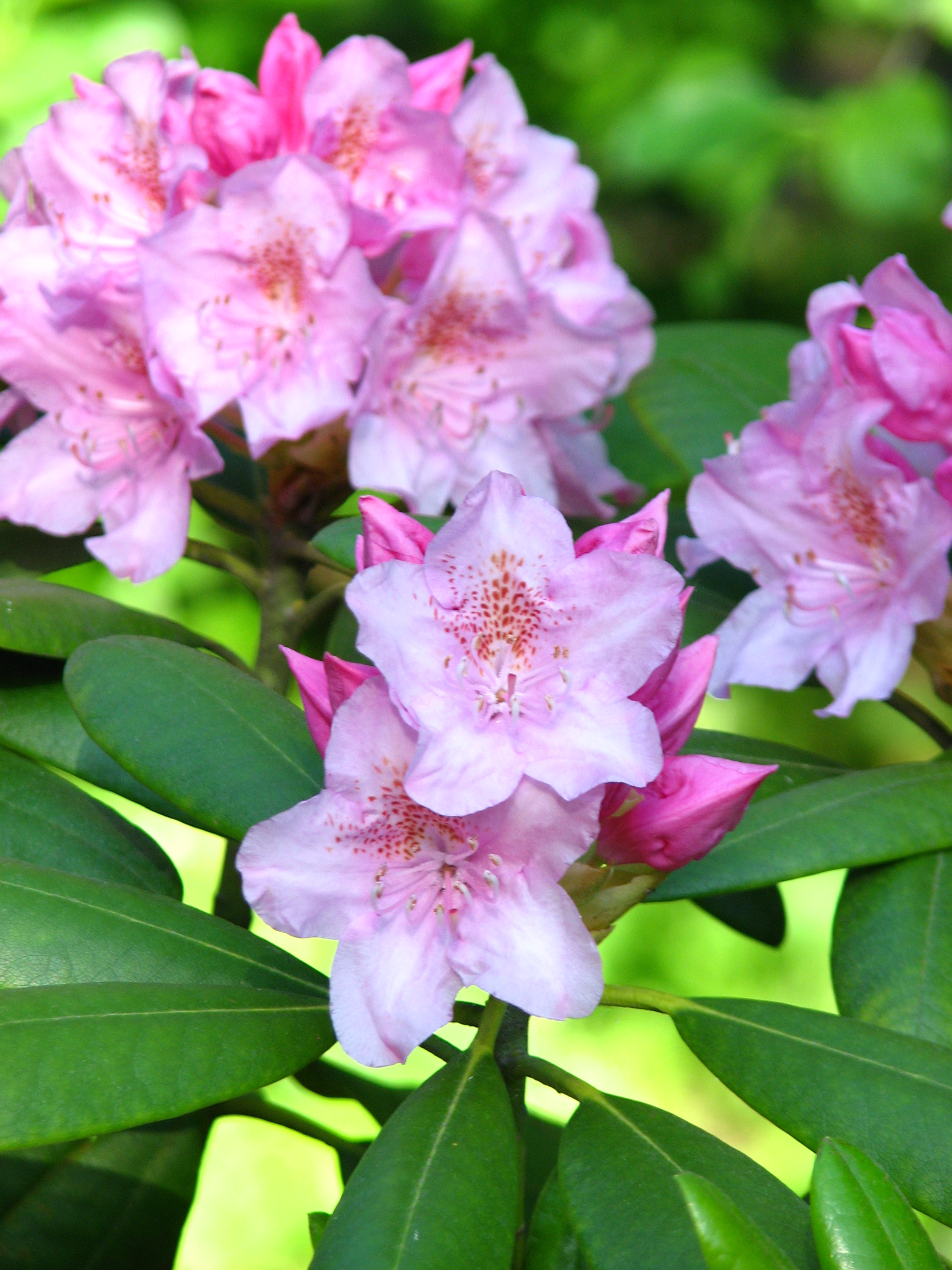
A pink rhododendron

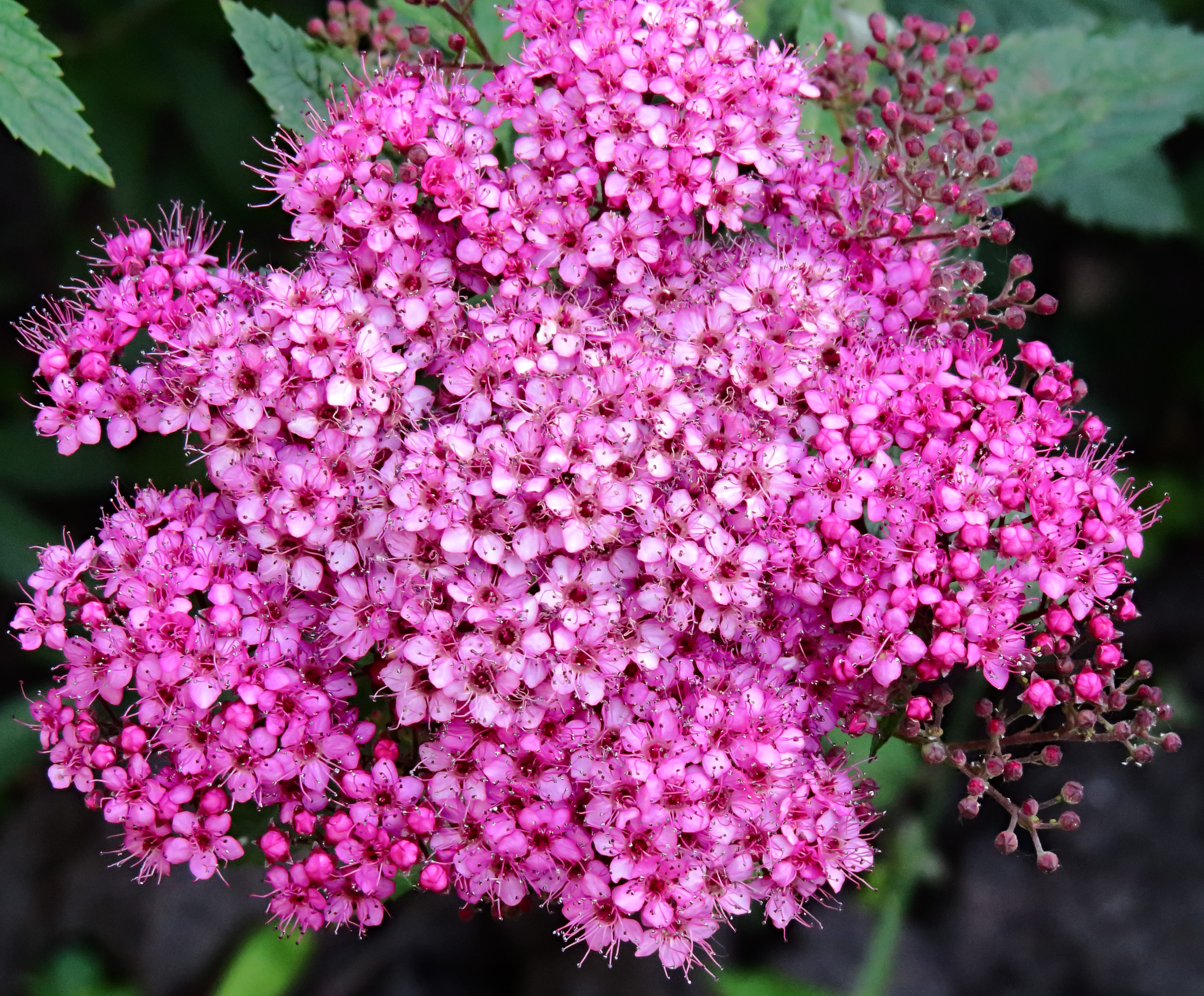
Spiraea japonica flowers.

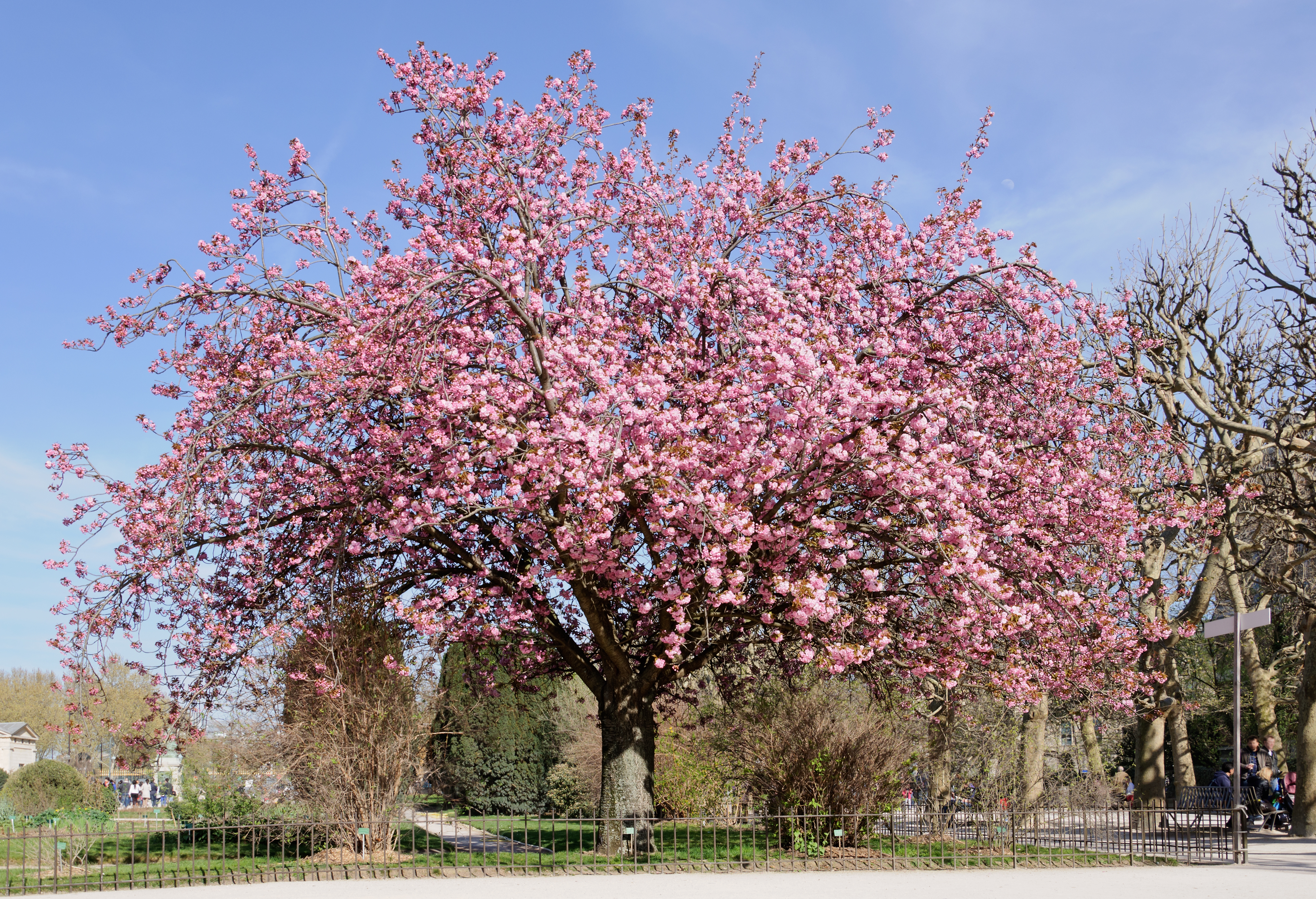
A Japanese cherry tree (Prunus serrulata) in bloom.

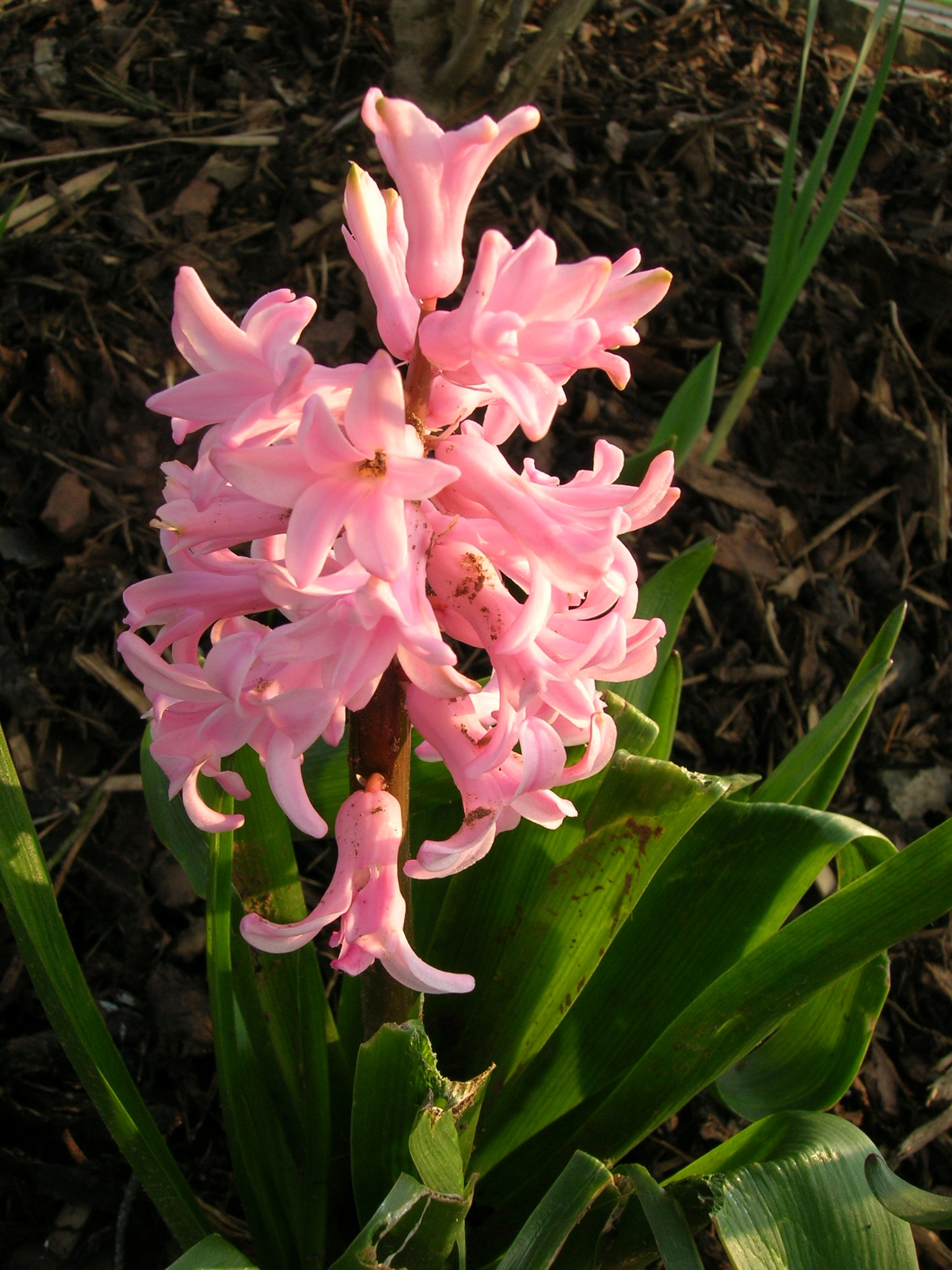
Pink hyacinth flowers

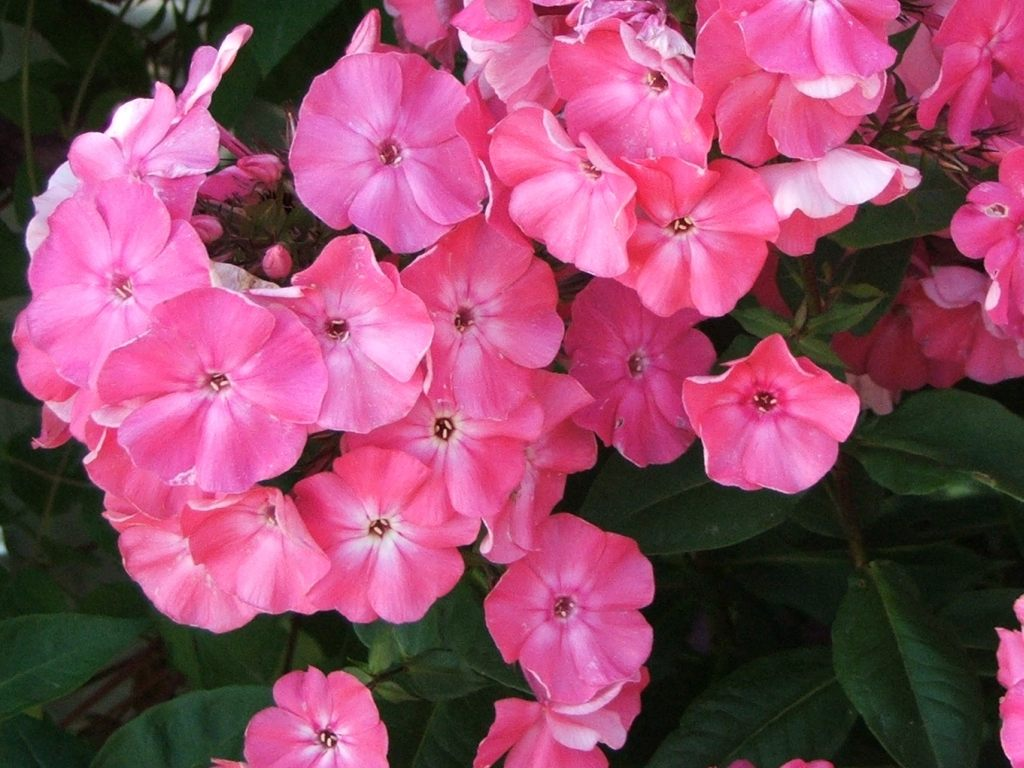
Phlox paniculata

=== Sunrises and sunsets ===
As a ray of white sunlight travels through the atmosphere, some of the colors are scattered out of the beam by air molecules and airborne particles. This is called Rayleigh scattering. Colors with a shorter wavelength, such as blue and green, scatter more strongly, and are removed from the light that finally reaches the eye. At sunrise and sunset, when the path of the sunlight through the atmosphere to the eye is longest, the blue and green components are removed almost completely, leaving the longer wavelength orange, red and pink light. The remaining pinkish sunlight can also be scattered by cloud droplets and other relatively large particles, which give the sky above the horizon a pink or reddish glow.

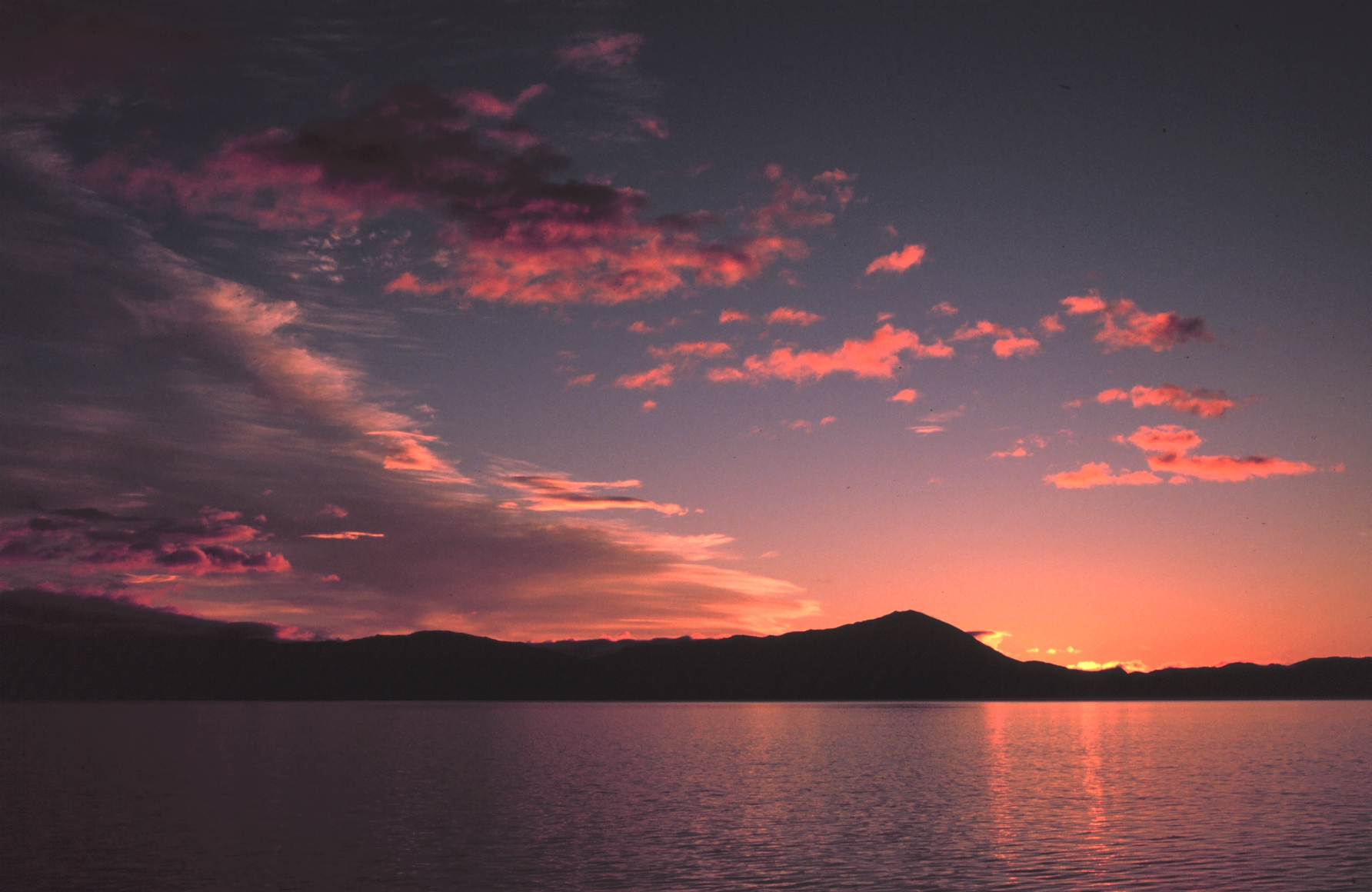
Sunrise in southeast Alaska. Sunsets and sunrises are sometimes pink because of an optical effect called Rayleigh scattering.

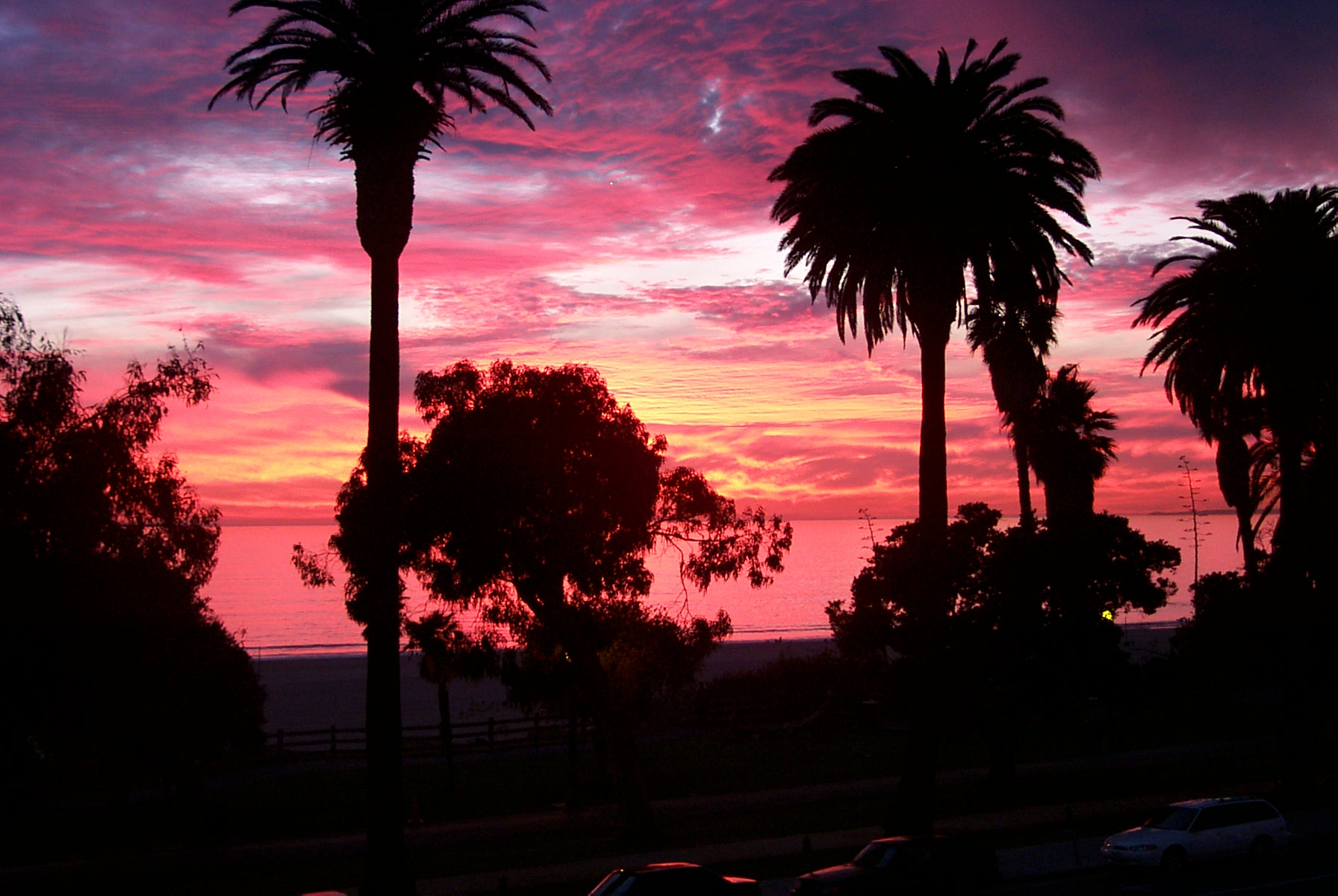
Sunset in Santa Monica, California.

=== Geology ===
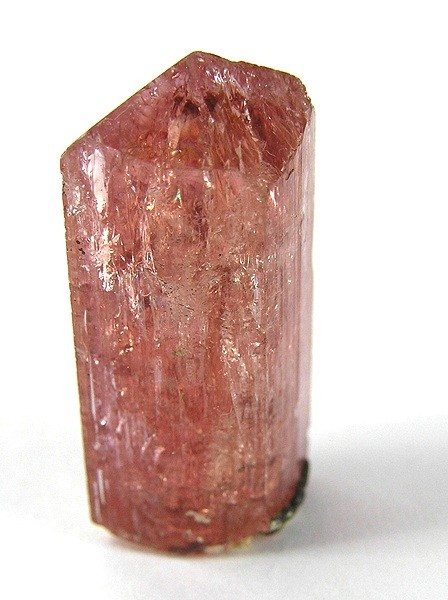
Pink topaz from Ouro Preto, Brazil.

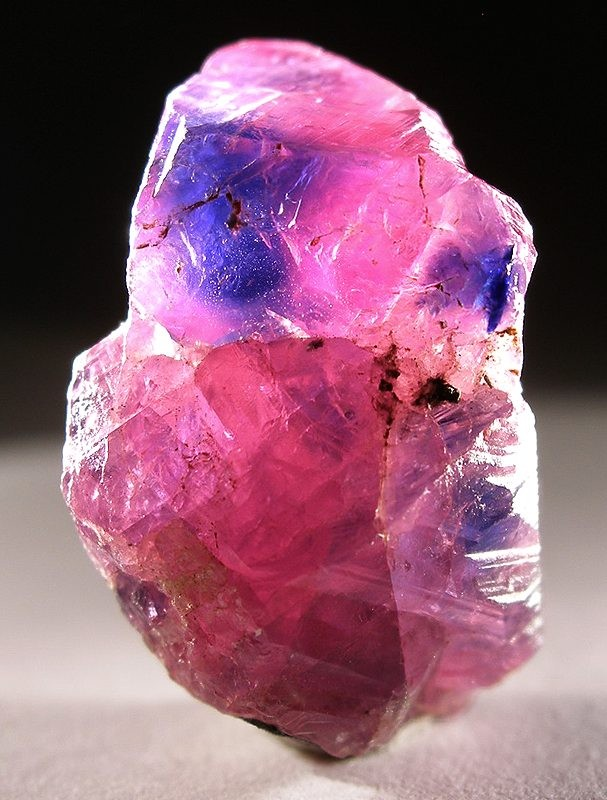
Corundum, or pink sapphire, from the Dodoma Region of Tanzania

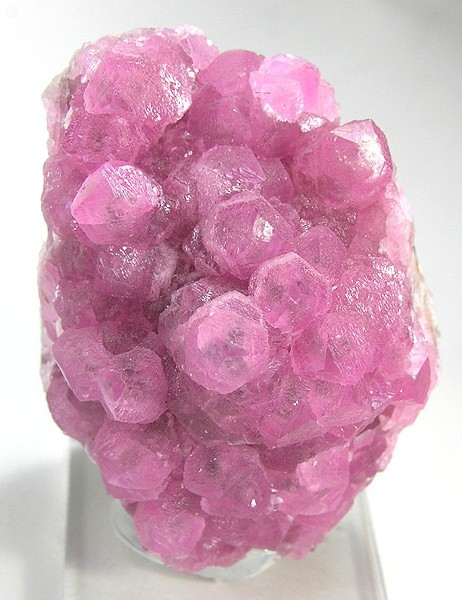
Calcite from Bou Azzer, Morocco

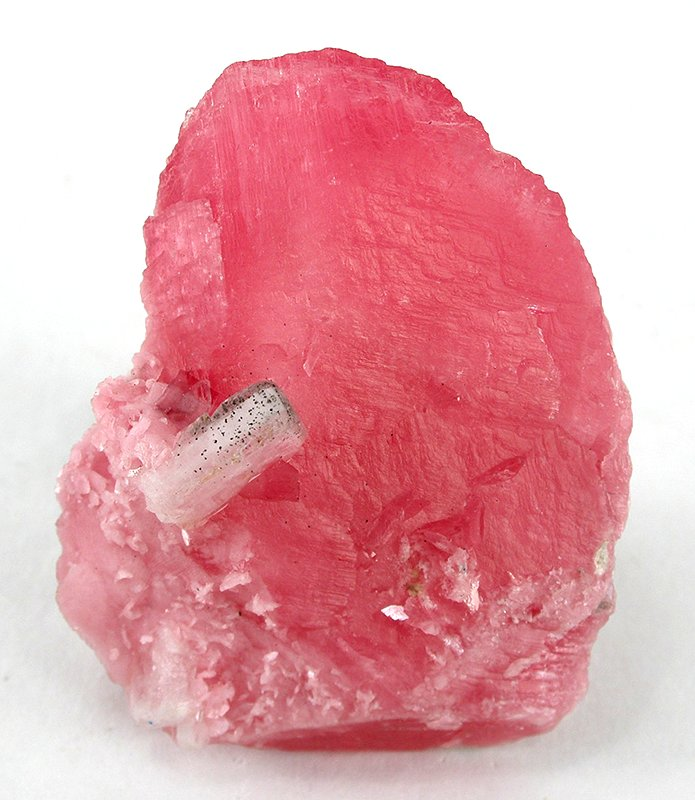
Barite-Rhodochrosite from the Guangxi Zhuang Autonomous Region in China.

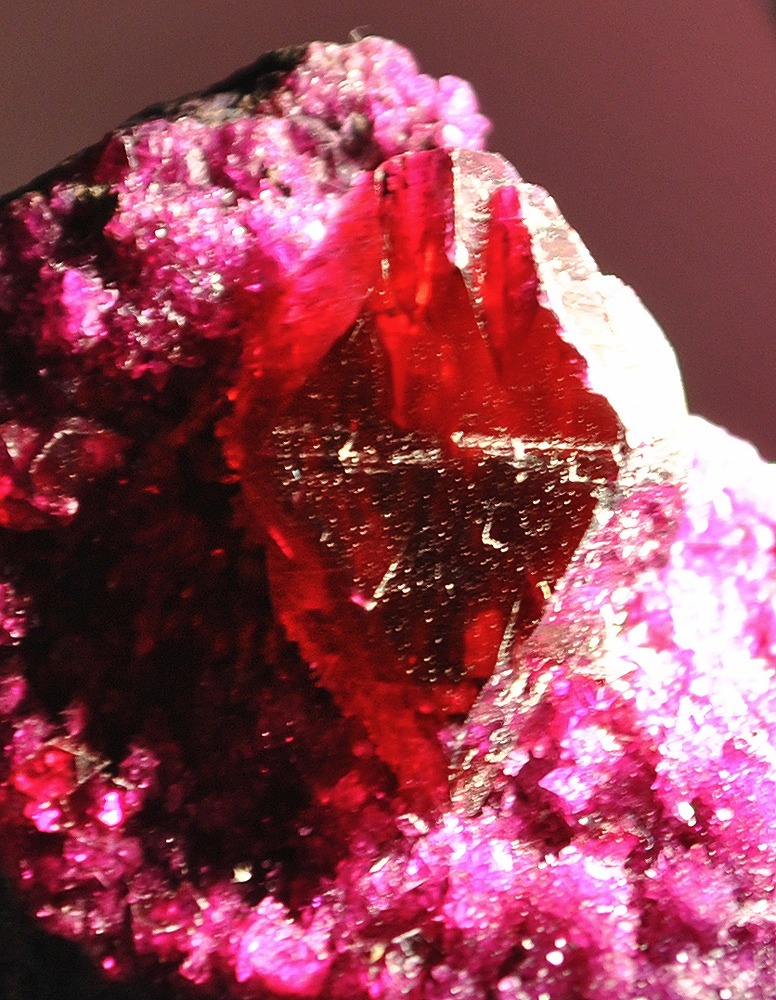
Clinochlore from Erzerum Province, Turkey

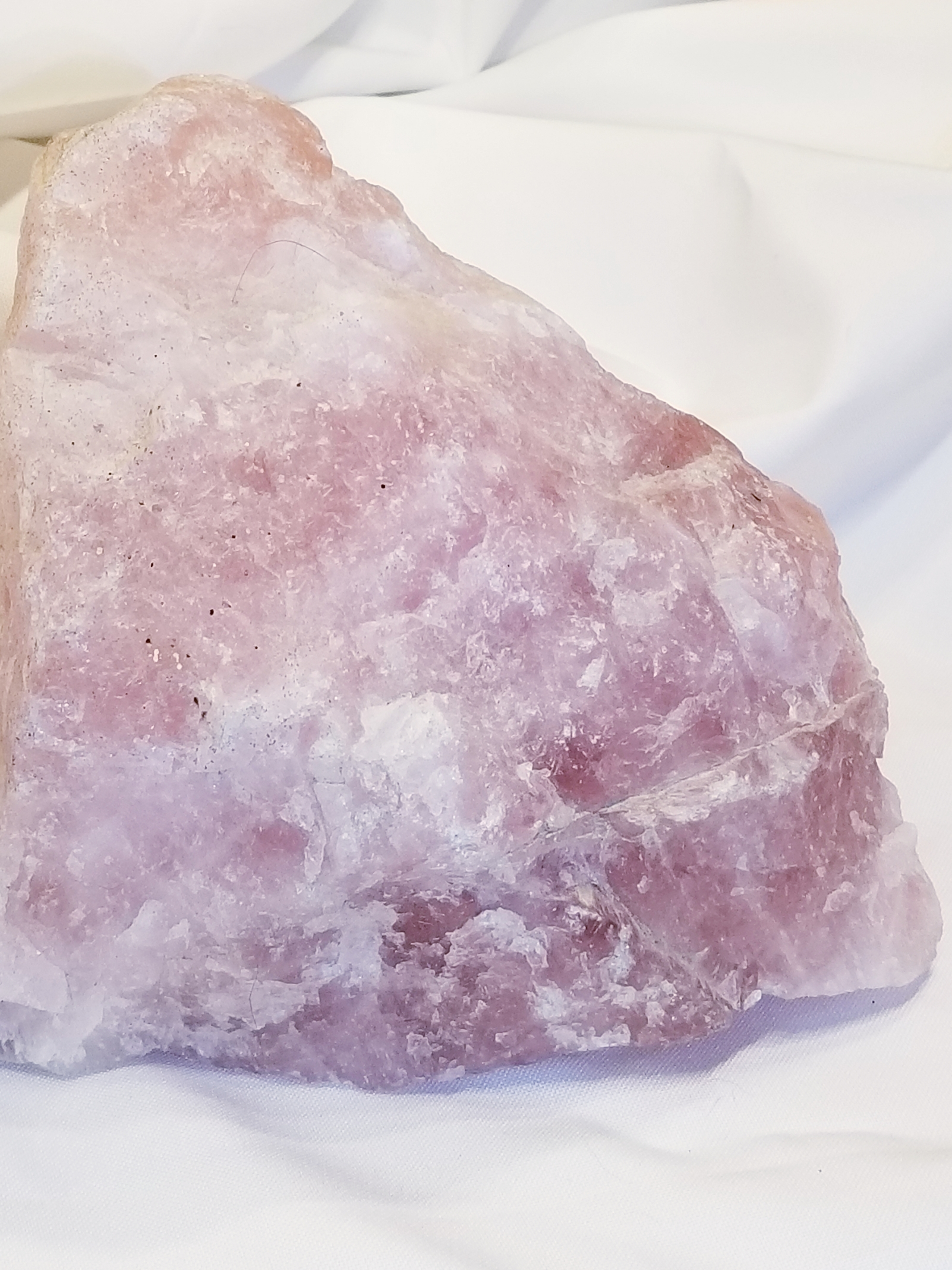
Rough rose quartz

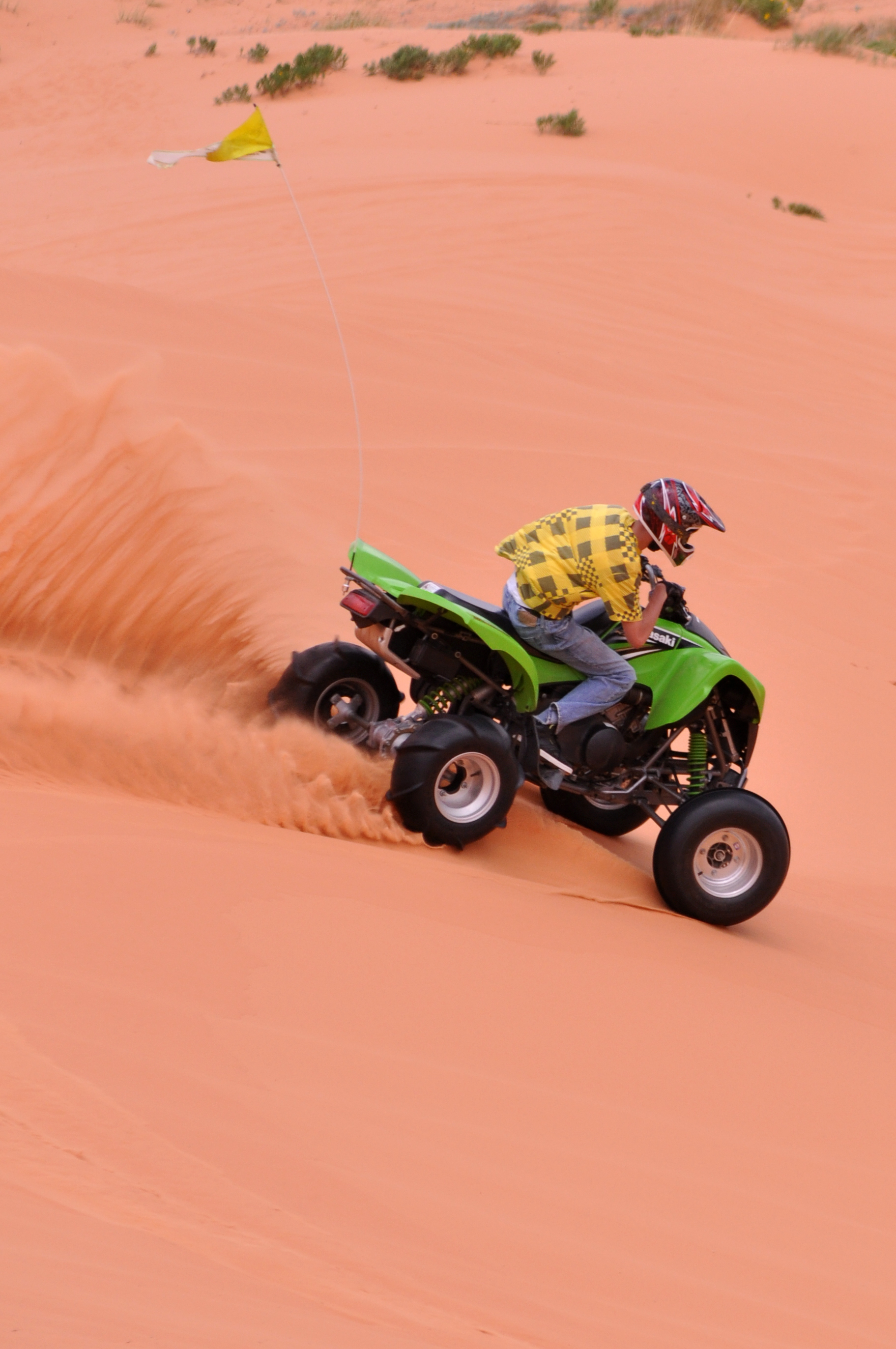
Coral Pink Sand Dunes State Park in Utah. The color is from Navajo Sandstone, reddish hematite mixed with white quartz grains

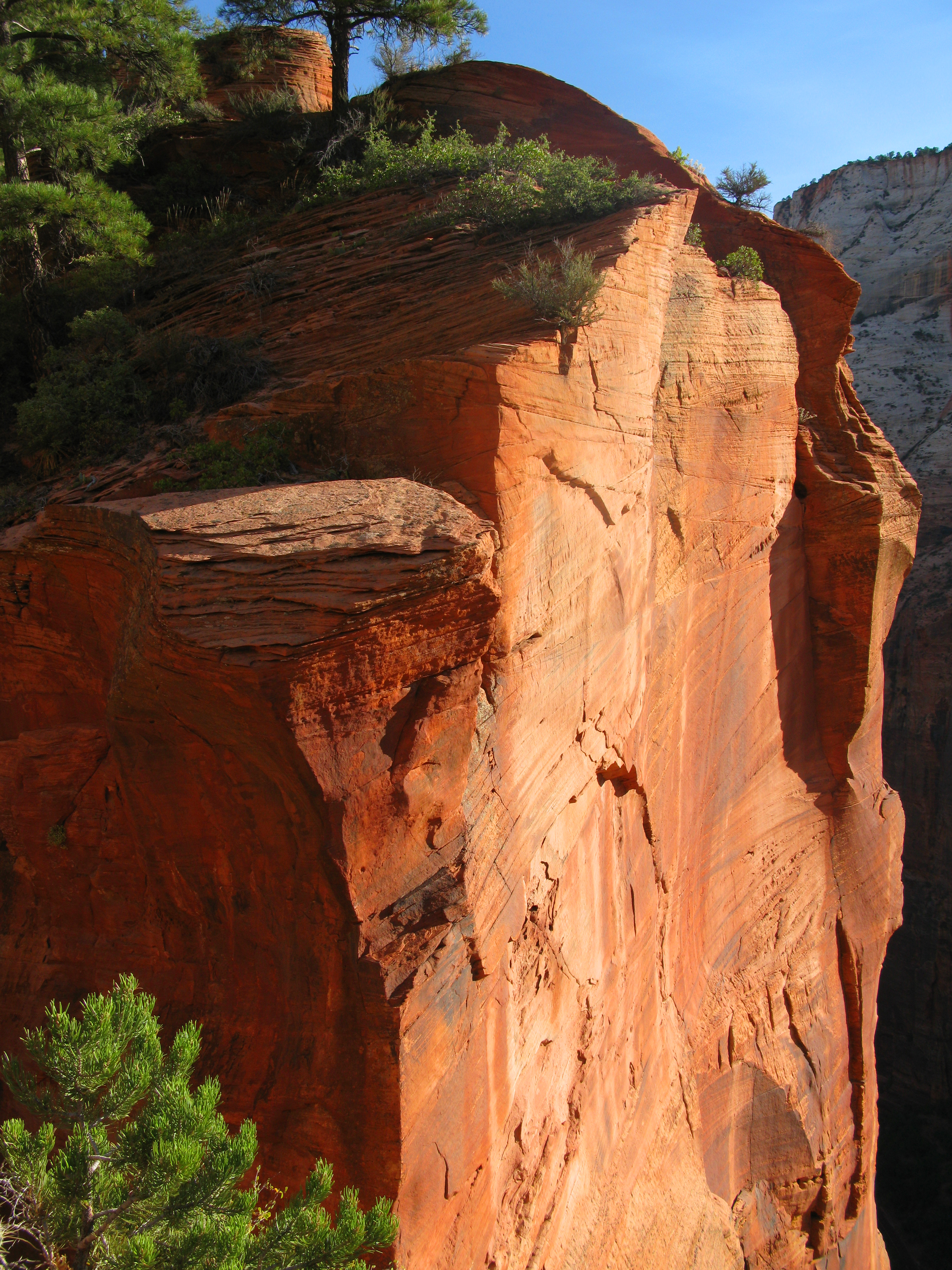
Angel's Landing in Zion National Park in Utah is made of pink sandstone.

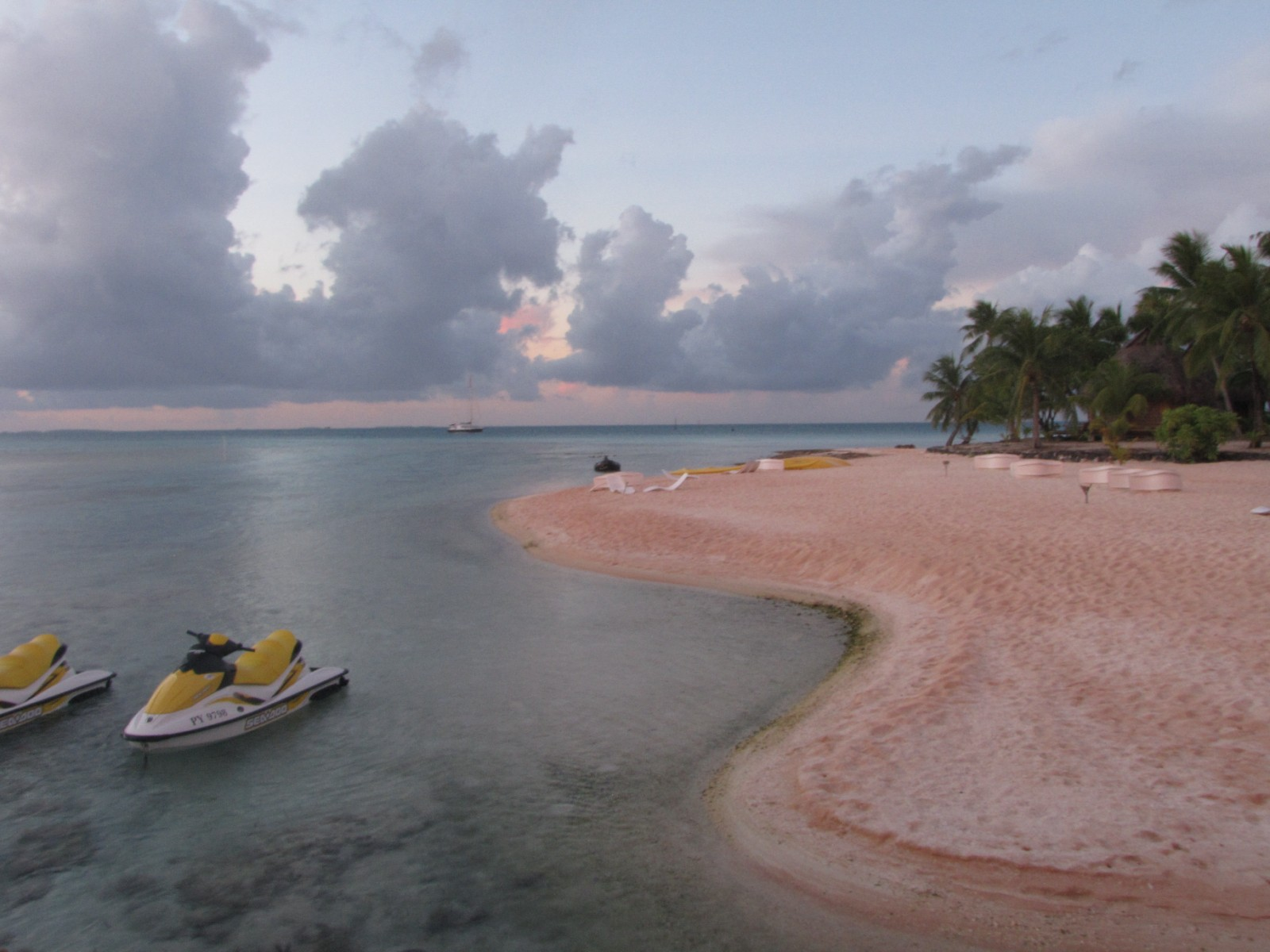
A pink sand beach on Tikehau in French Polynesia

=== Biology ===
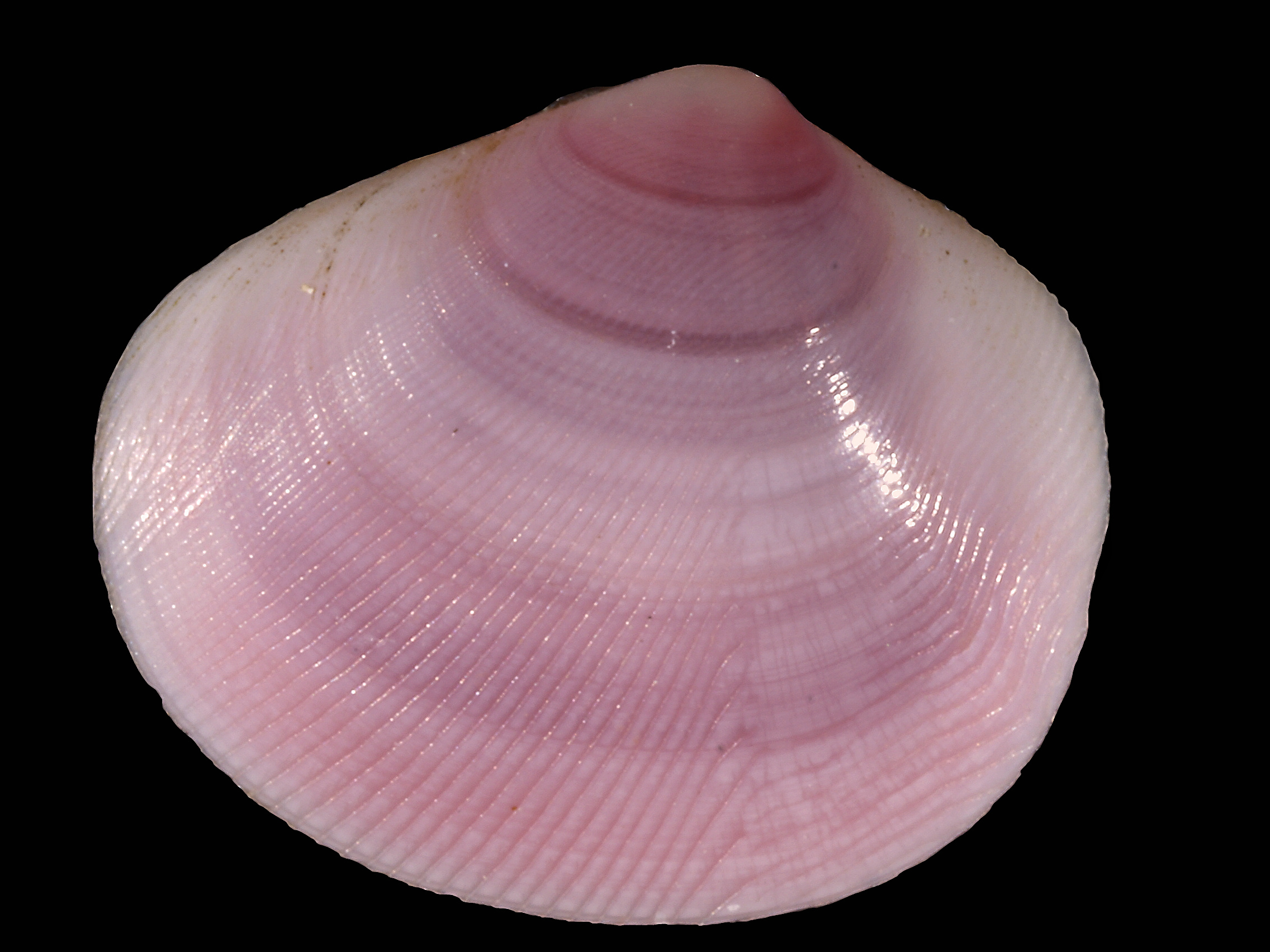
A Strigilla carnaria shell from Dominica, in the West Indies.

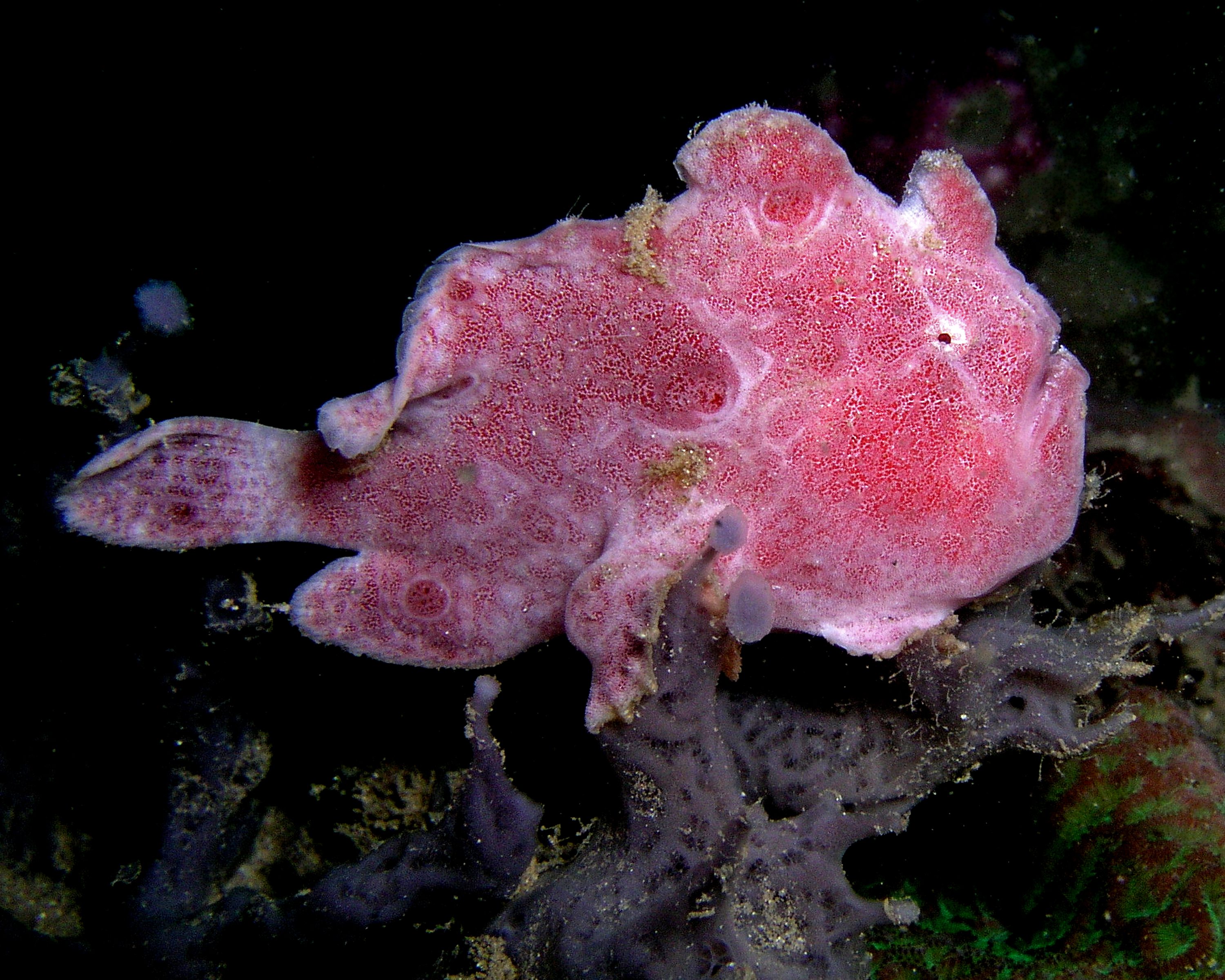
An Ocelated frogfish (Antennarius ocellatus), from East Timor. The frogfish is camouflaged to look like a rock covered with algae or seaweed; it lies motionless and waits for its prey to come to it.

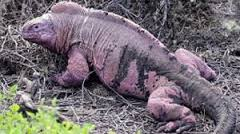
The pink iguana of the Galapagos Islands was first identified in 1986 and first recognized as a distinct species in 2009.

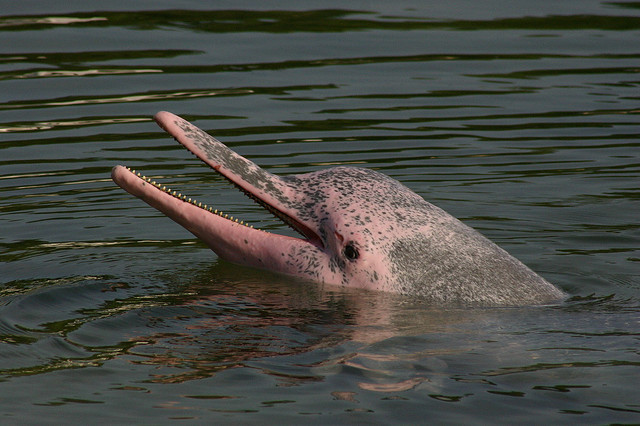
The Pink Dolphin is a freshwater river dolphin which lives in the Orinoco, Amazon and Araguaia/Tocantins River systems of Brazil, Bolivia, Peru, Ecuador, Colombia and Venezuela. It is an endangered species and has a brain 40% larger than a human's.

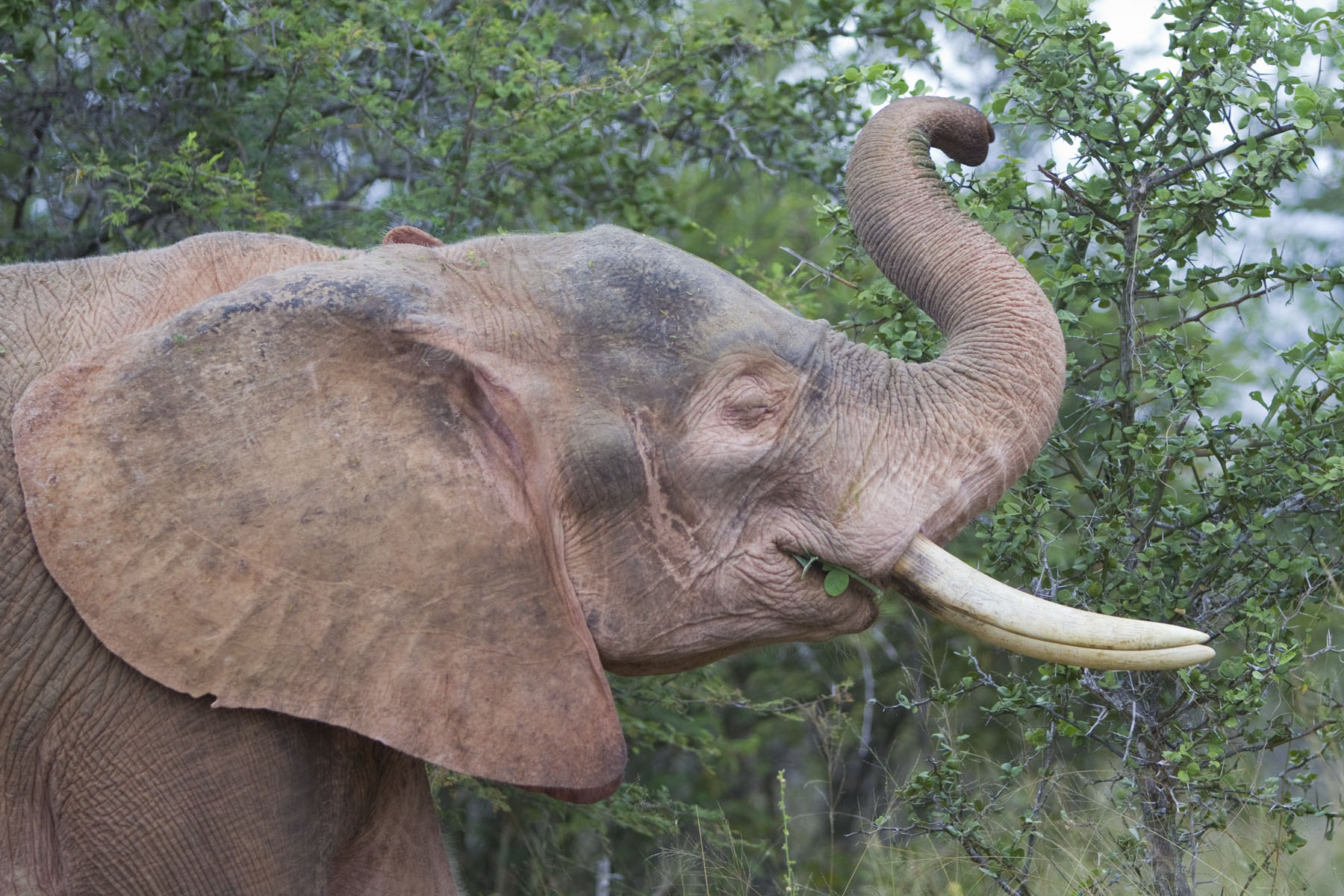
The so-called "white elephant" is revered in several countries in Southeast Asia and is naturally pinkish gray. They are actually albino elephants.

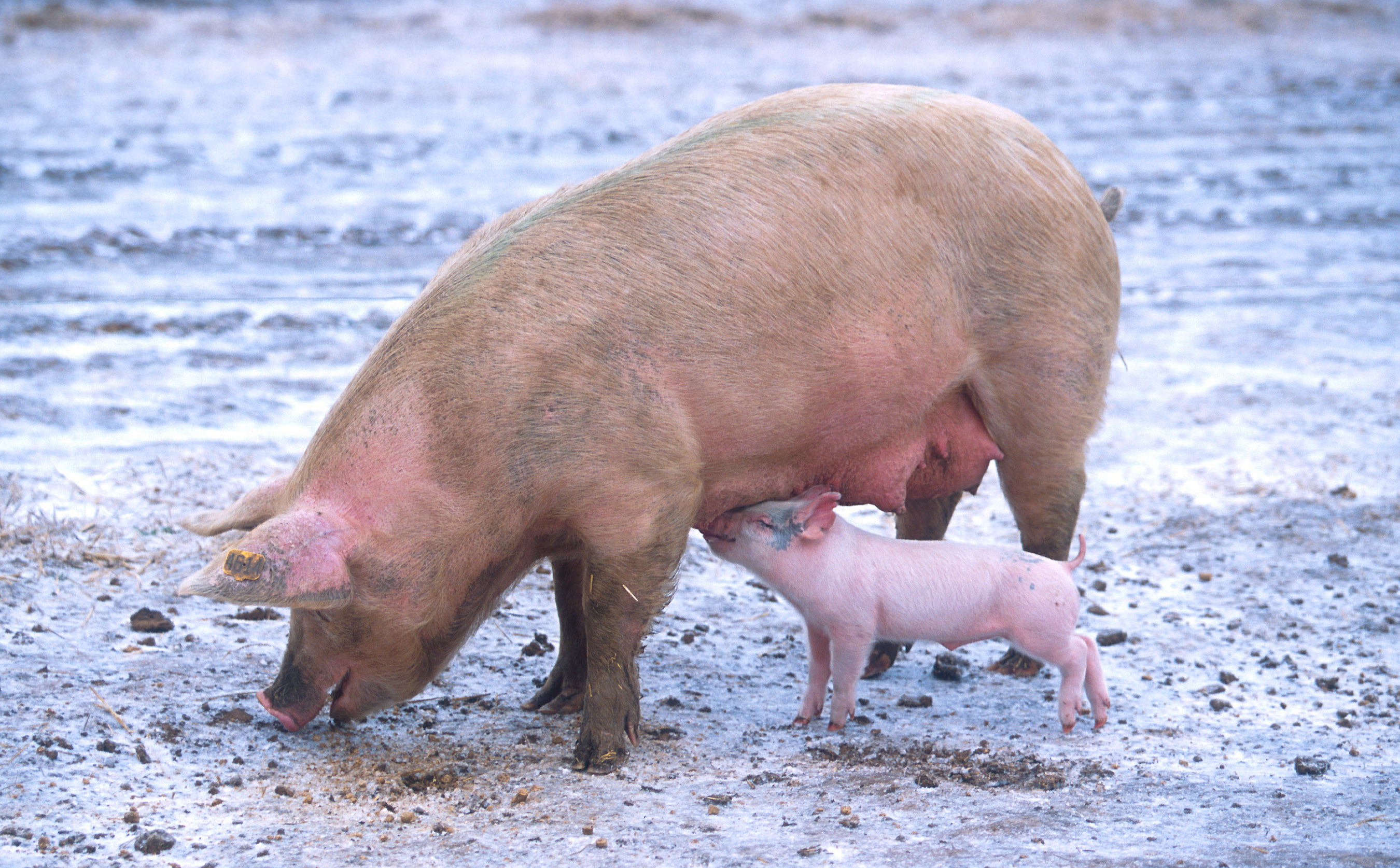
The pig has been domesticated over ten thousand years and selectively bred to have a pink skin, without melanin, which farmers traditionally have preferred to a dark color.

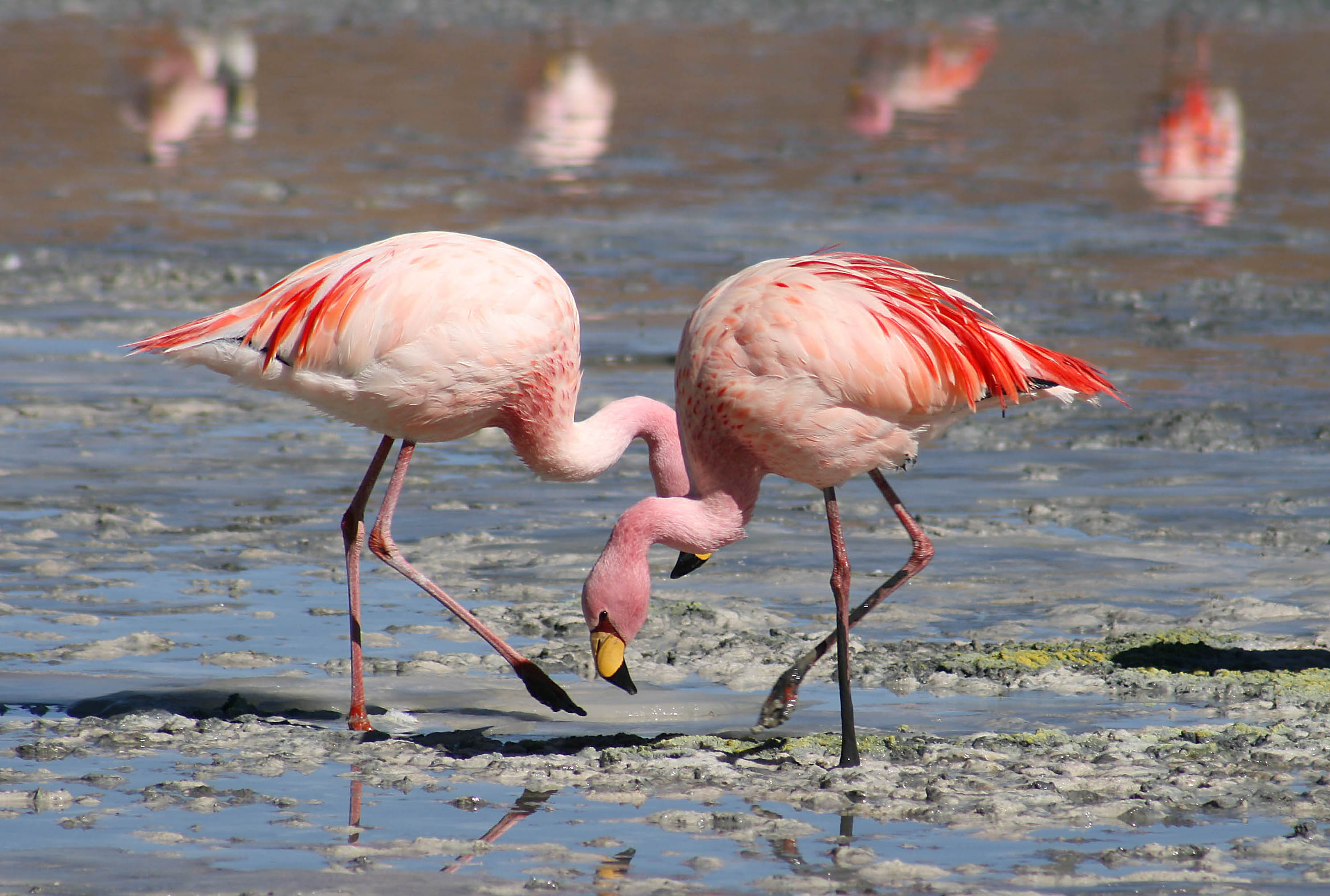
Flamingoes in Laguna Colorada, Bolivia. The pink or reddish color of flamingos comes from carotenoid proteins in their diet of animal and plant plankton. An unhealthy or malnourished flamingo, or one kept in captivity and not fed sufficient carotene, is usually pale or white.

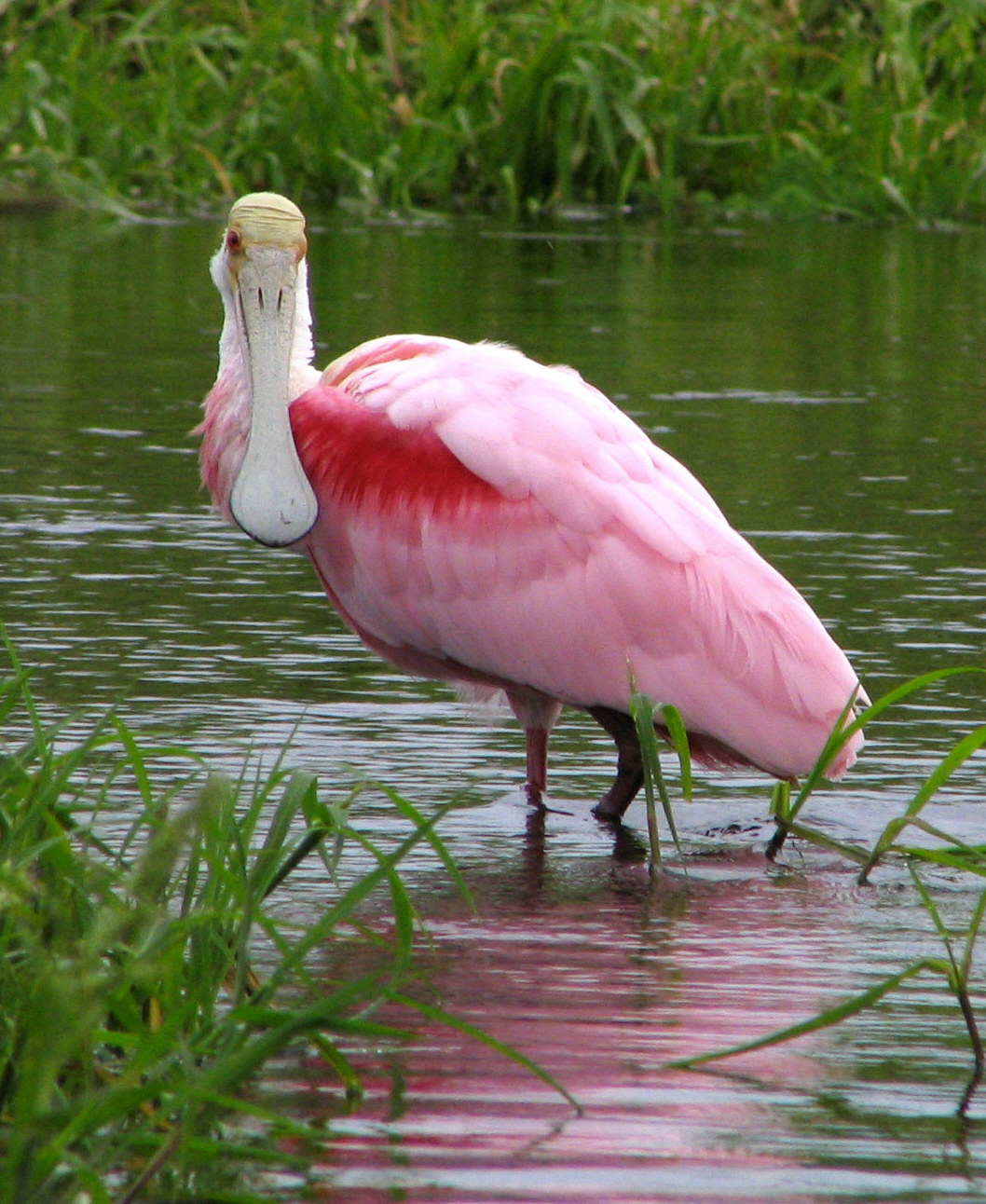
A Roseate spoonbill in Myakka River State Park in Florida. Its pink color, like that of the flamingo, comes from the carotenoid pigments in its diet.

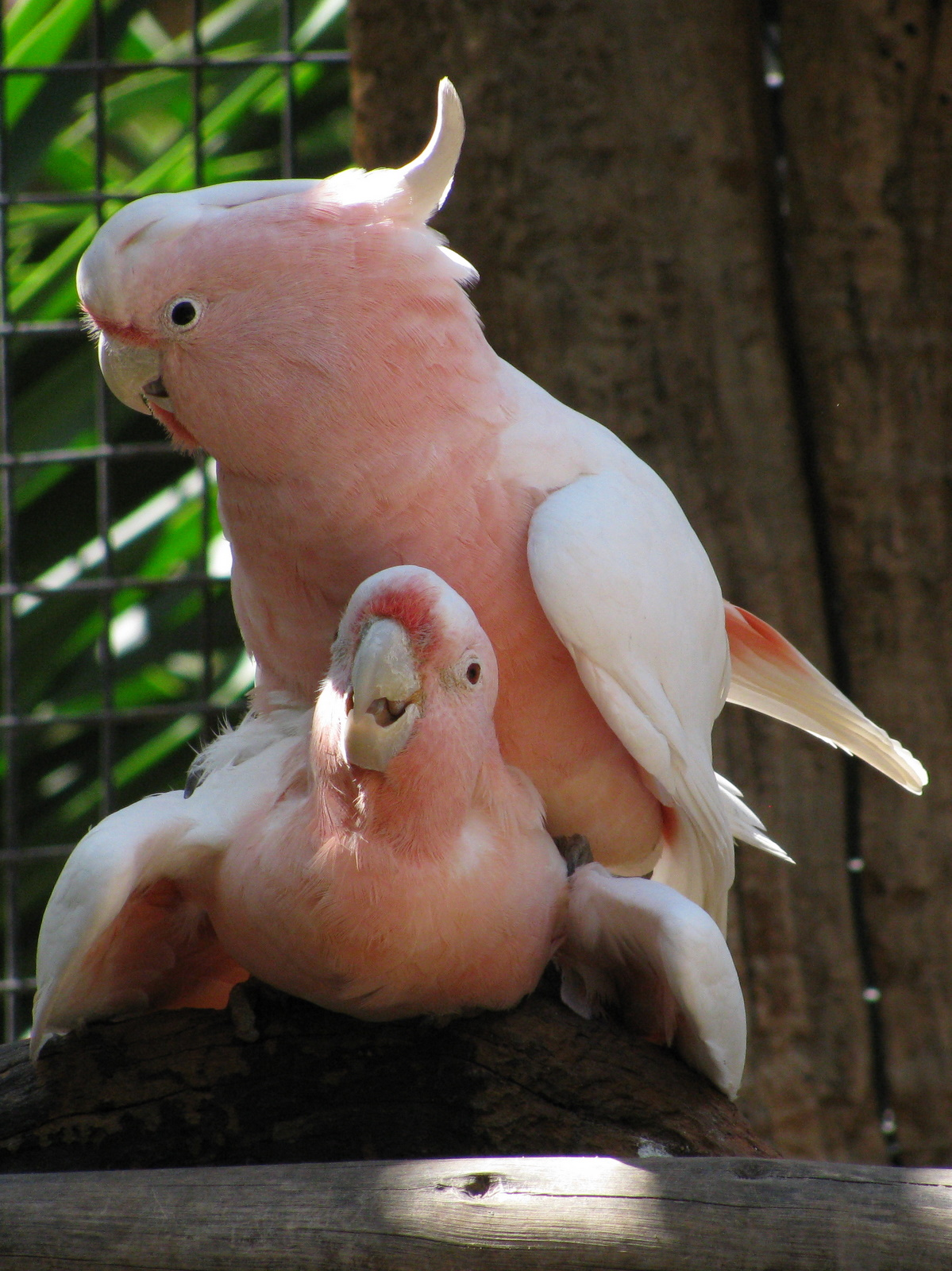
The Lophochroa leadbeateri, commonly known as Major Mitchell's Cockatoo or the pink cockatoo, is a native of the arid interior regions of Australia.

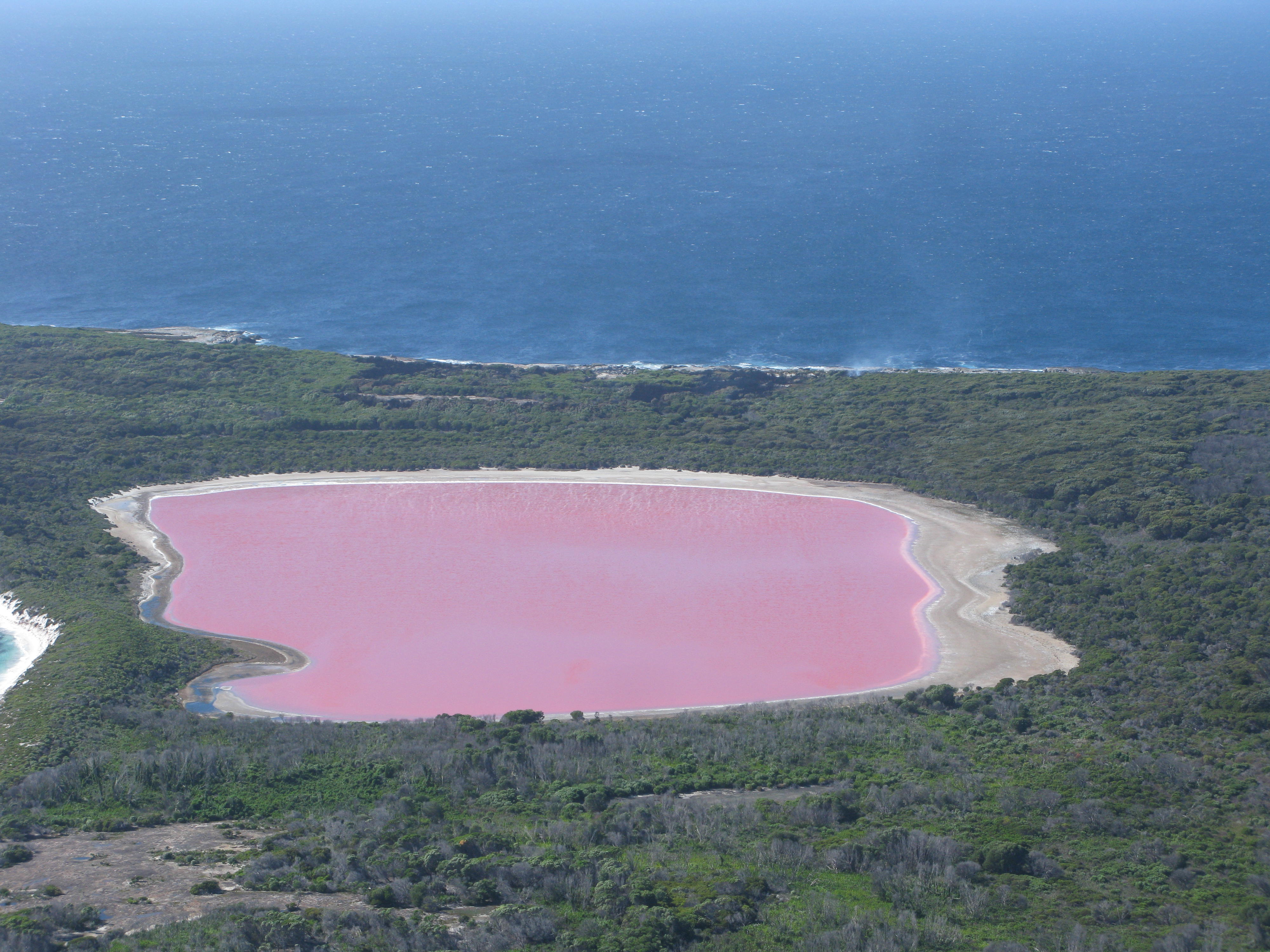
Lake Hillier, Australia, the color is caused by algae

=== Sound ===
- Pink noise (sample), also known as 1/f noise, in audio engineering is a signal or process with a frequency spectrum such that the power spectral density is proportional to the reciprocal of the frequency.

=== Lighting ===
- Some grow lights emit a combination of red and blue wavelengths to align with the absorbance spectrum of chlorophyll (the photosynthesizing pigment in plants), appearing pink to the human eye.
- Pink neon signs are generally produced using one of two different methods. One method is to use neon gas and a blue or purple phosphor, which generally produces a warmer (more reddish) or more intense shade of pink. Another method is to use an argon/mercury blend and a red phosphor, which generally produces a cooler (more purplish) or softer shade of pink.
- Pink LEDs can be produced using two methods, either with a blue LED using two phosphors (yellow for the first phosphor, and red, orange, or pink for the second), or by placing a pink dye on top of a white LED. Color shifting was a common issue with early pink LEDs, where the red, orange, or pink phosphors or dyes faded over time, causing the pink color to eventually shift towards white or blue. These issues have been mitigated by the more recent introduction of more fade-resistant phosphors.

=== Engineering ===
- Insulation manufactured by Owens Corning is dyed pink, with the Pink Panther as its corporate mascot. The company holds a trademark on the color pink for insulation products in order to prevent competitors from using it, and is the first company in the United States to trademark a color.
- The United States Manual on Uniform Traffic Control Devices specifies fluorescent pink as an optional color for traffic signs used for incident management as an alternative to the traditional orange in order to distinguish them from construction zone signs.

== Culture and symbolism ==
=== Common associations and popularity ===
There was a notable difference between men and women in regards to a preference for pink; three percent of women chose pink as their favorite color, compared with less than one percent of men. Many of the men surveyed were unable to even identify pink correctly, confusing it with mauve. Pink was also more popular with older people than younger.

In Japan, pink is the color most commonly associated with springtime due to the blooming cherry blossoms. This is different from surveys in the United States and Europe where green is the color most associated with springtime.

=== Pink in other languages ===
In many languages, the word for the color pink is based on the name of the rose flower; like rose in French; roze in Dutch; rosa in German, Latin, Portuguese, Catalan, Spanish, Italian, Swedish and Norwegian (Nynorsk and Bokmål); розовый (rozovyy) in Russian; różowy in Polish; ורוד (varód) in Hebrew; গোলাপি (golapi) in Bangla; and गुलाबी (gulābee) in Hindi. In English "rose", too, often refers to both the flower and the color.

In Chinese, the color pink is named with a compound noun 粉紅色, meaning "powder red" where the powder refers to substances used for women's make-up.

In Danish, Faroese and Finnish, the color pink is described as a lighter shade of red: lyserød in Danish, ljósareyður in Faroese and vaaleanpunainen in Finnish, all meaning "light red". Similarly, some Celtic languages use a term meaning "whitish red": gwynnrudh in Cornish, bándearg in Irish, bane-yiarg in Manx, bàn-dhearg in Scottish Gaelic (which also uses liath-dhearg "greyish/pale red" and pinc from English). In Icelandic, the color is called bleikur, originally meaning "pale".

In the Japanese language, the traditional word for pink, momo-iro (ももいろ), takes its name from the peach blossom. There is a separate word for the color of the cherry blossom: sakura-iro. In recent times a word based on the English version, pinku (ピンク), has begun to be used.

The Thai word for the color, ชมพู (chom-puu), derives ultimately from Sanskrit जम्बू (jambū) "rose apple".

=== Idioms and expressions ===
- In the pink. To be in top form, in good health, in good condition. In Romeo and Juliet, Mercutio says; "I am the very pink of courtesy." Romeo: Pink for flower? Mercutio: Right. Romeo: Then my pump is well flowered."
- To see pink elephants means to experience hallucination often from the consumption of alcohol. The expression was used by American novelist Jack London in his book John Barleycorn in 1913.
- Pink slip. To be given a pink slip means to be fired or dismissed from a job. It was first recorded in 1915 in the United States.
- The phrase "pink-collar worker" refers to persons working in jobs conventionally regarded as "women's work".
- Pink money, the pink pound or pink dollar is an economic term which refers to the spending power of the LGBT community. Advertising agencies sometimes call the gay market the pink economy.
- Tickled pink means extremely pleased.
- The Pink Tax refers to the invisible price women must pay for goods that are created and advertised specifically for them. It is the tendency for products targeted specifically toward women to be more expensive than those targeted toward men.

=== Architecture ===
Early pink buildings were usually built of brick or sandstone, which takes its pale red color from hematite, or iron ore. In the 18th century - the golden age of pink and other pastel colors - pink mansions and churches were built all across Europe. More modern pink buildings usually use the color pink to appear exotic or to attract attention.

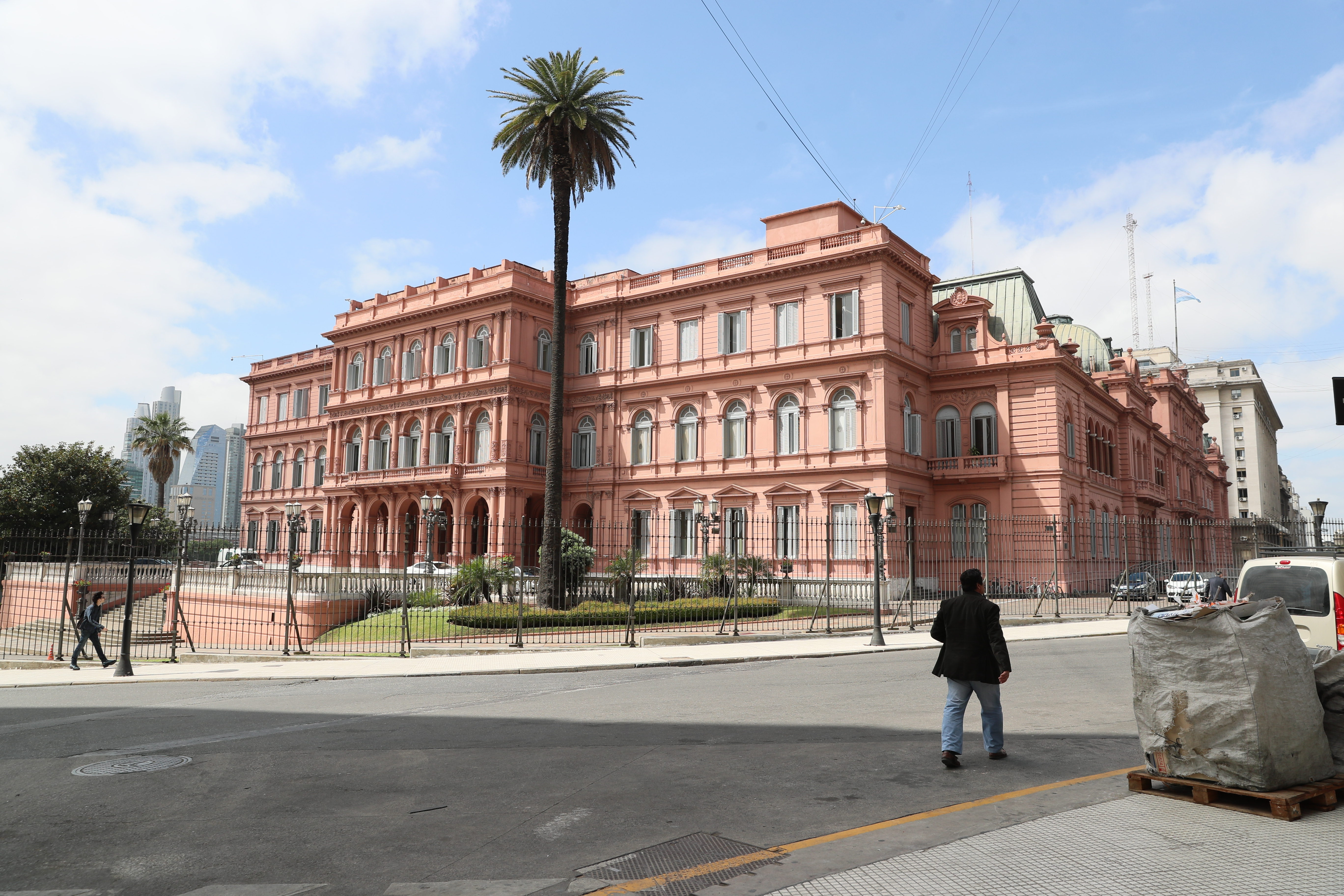
Casa Rosada, or the "Pink House", in Buenos Aires, built between 1713 and 1855 as a fort and then customs house, is the official residence and office of the President of Argentina.

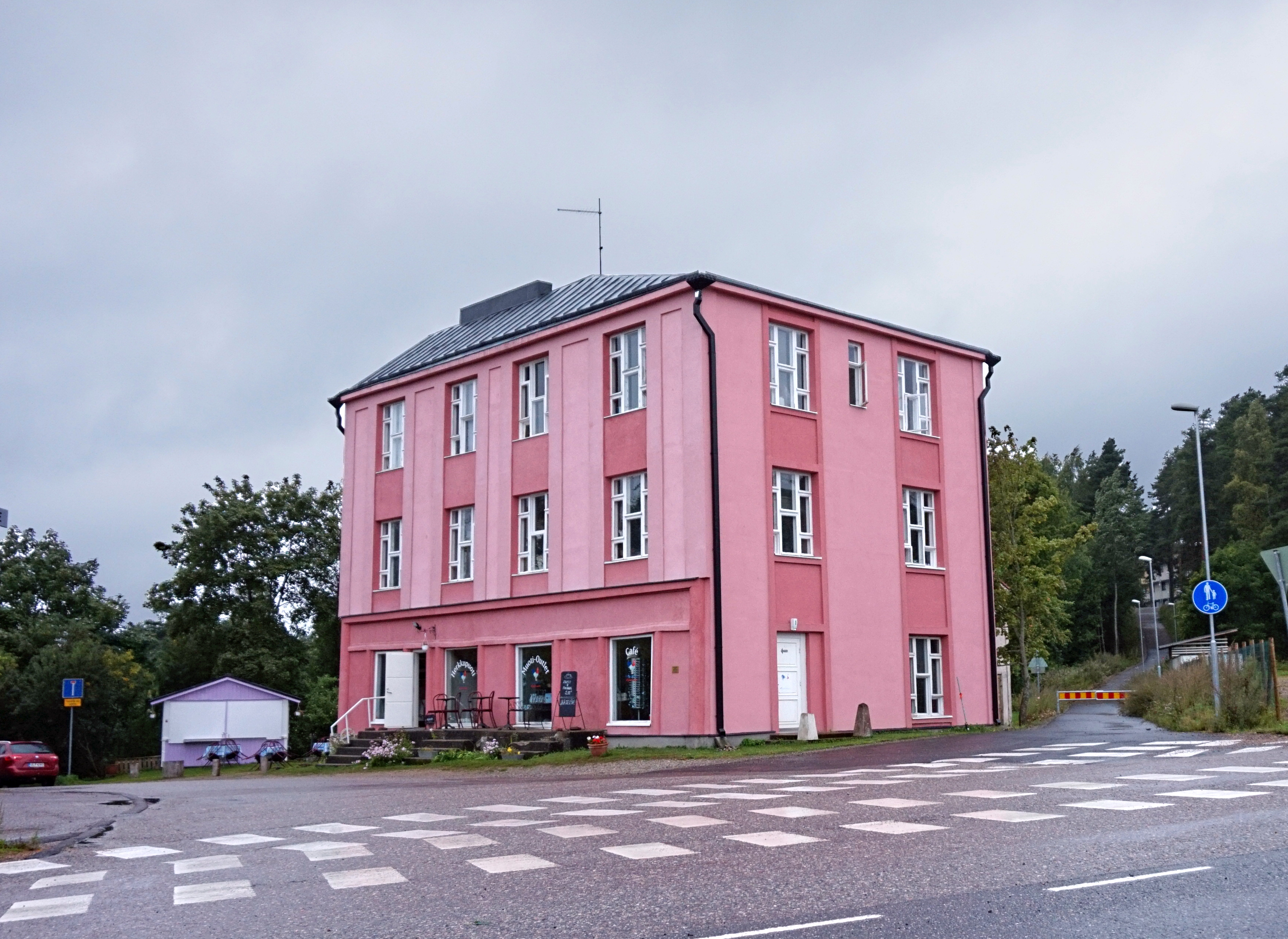
A pink building in Vääksy, Asikkala, Finland.

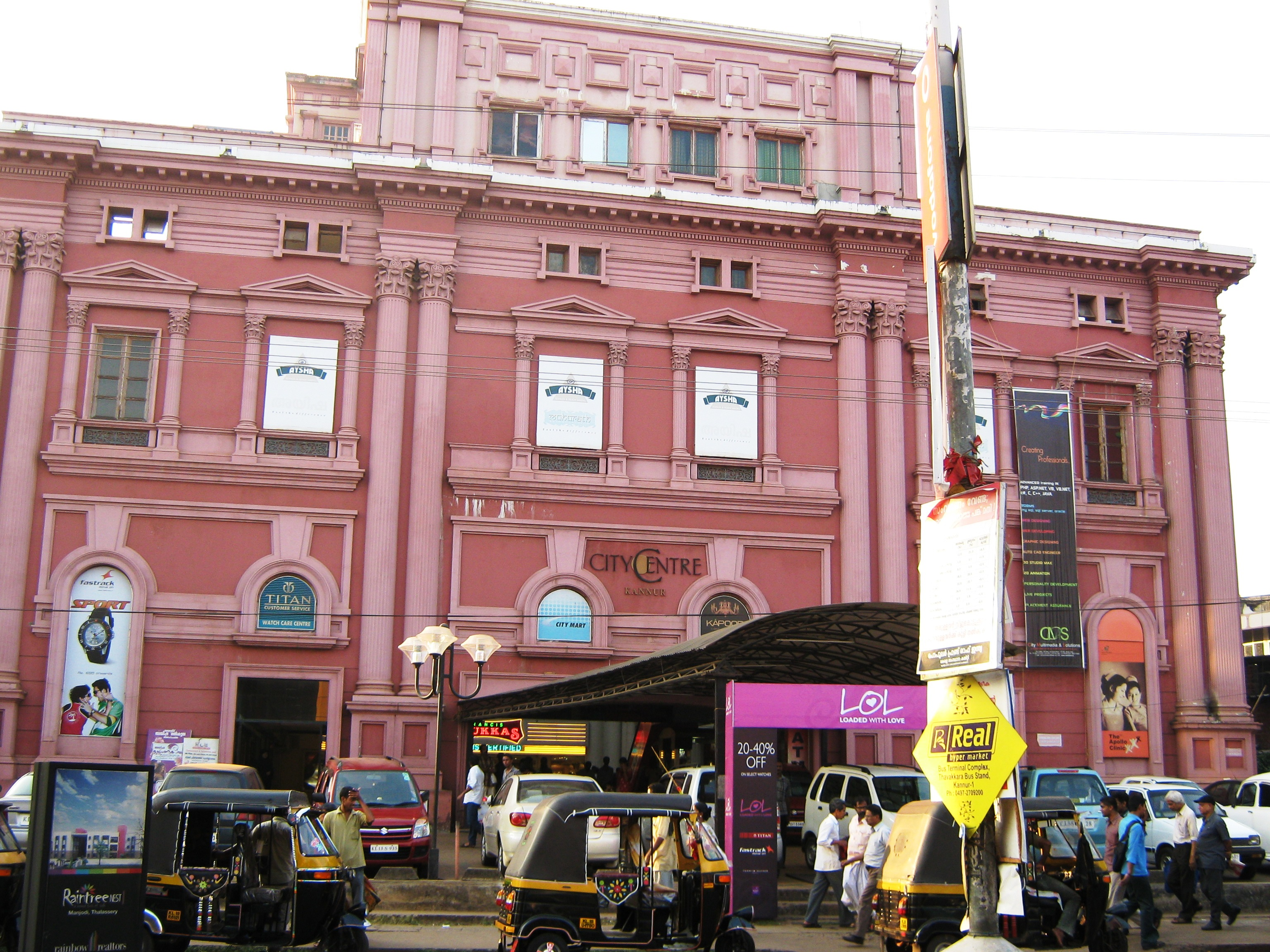
The City Center in Kannur, India.

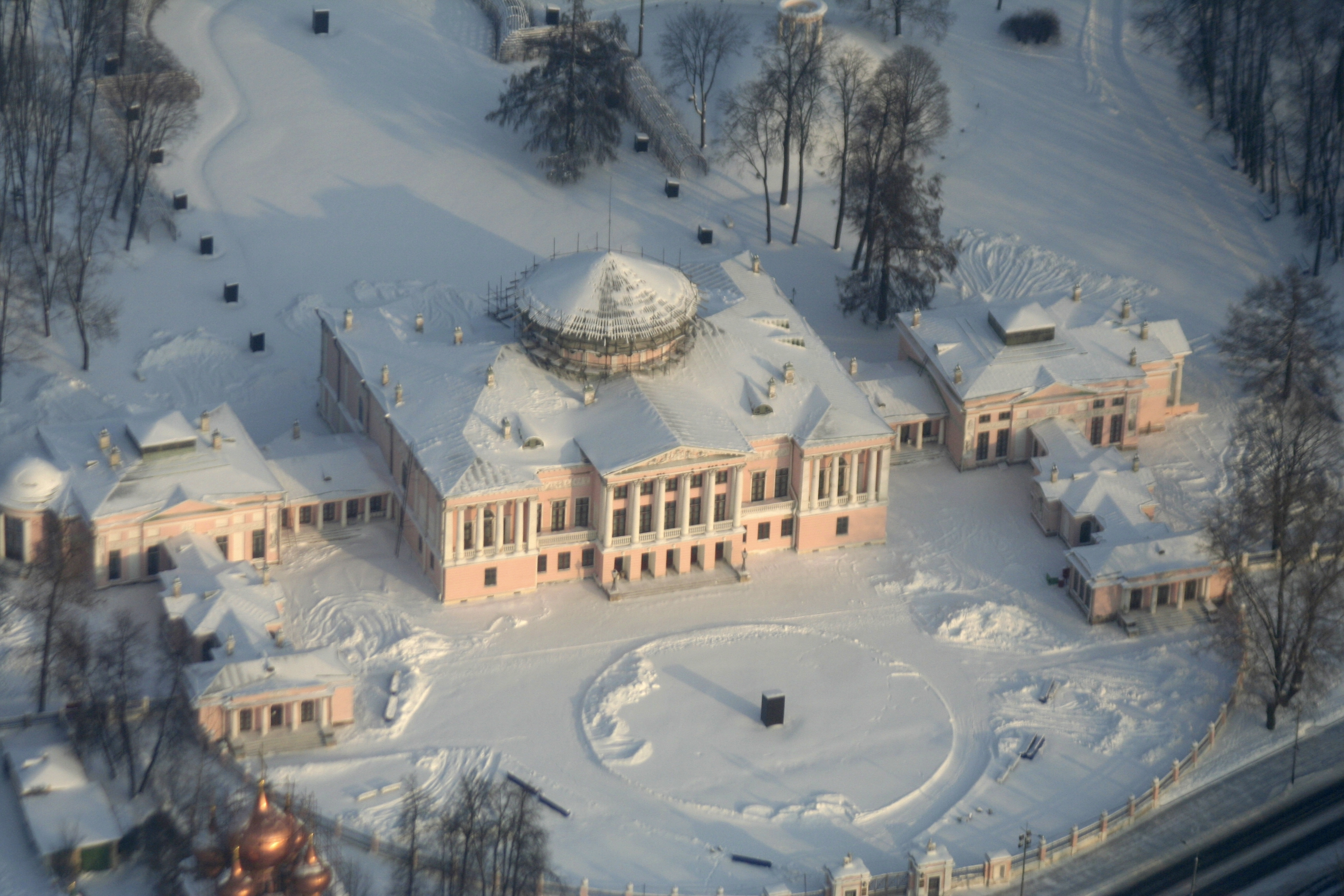
Ostankino Palace, outside of Moscow, is an 18th-century country house built by Pyotr Sheremetev, then the richest man in Russia.

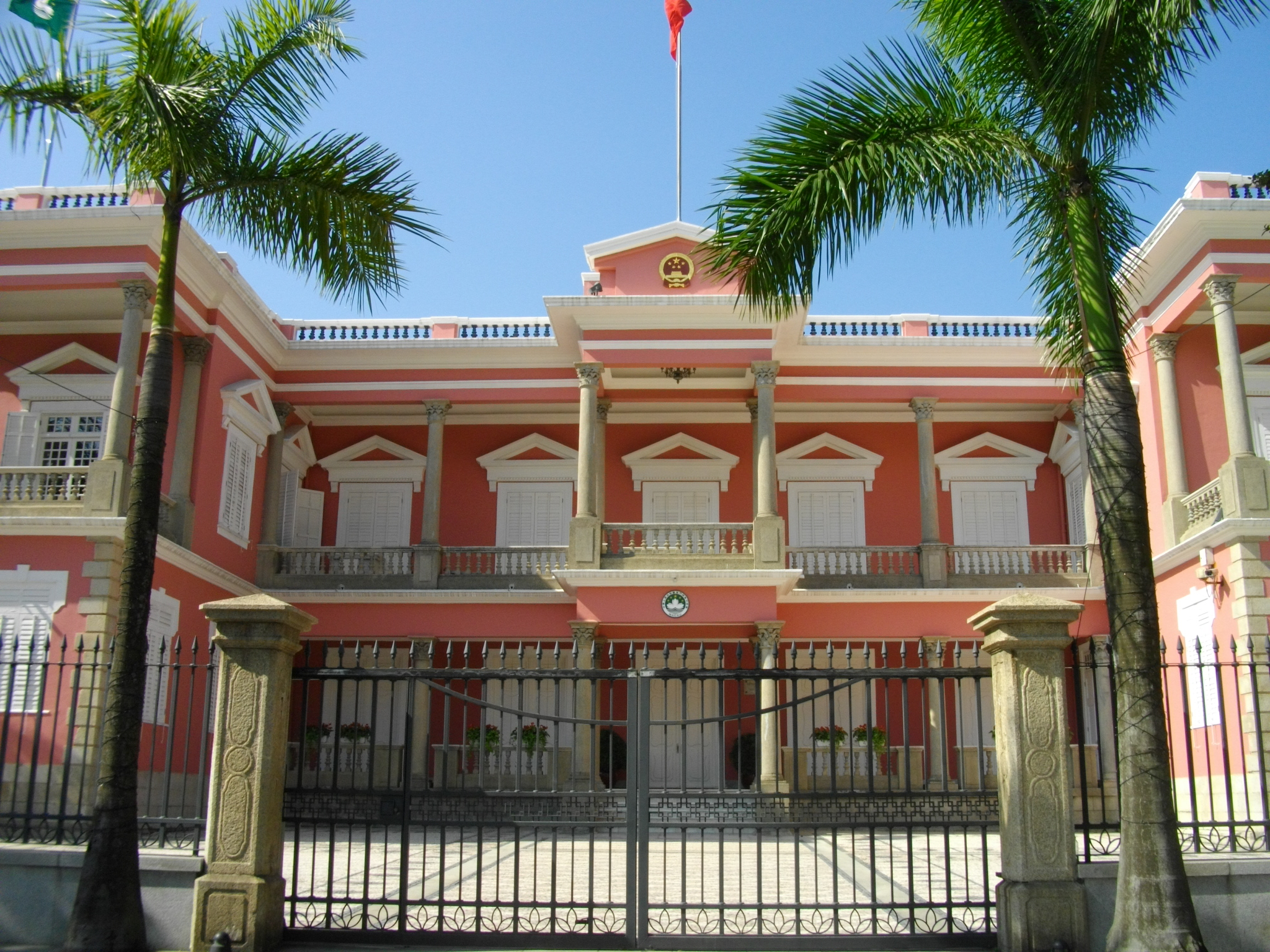
Macau Government Headquarters (1849), an example of Portuguese colonial architecture and the Pombaline style in Macau.

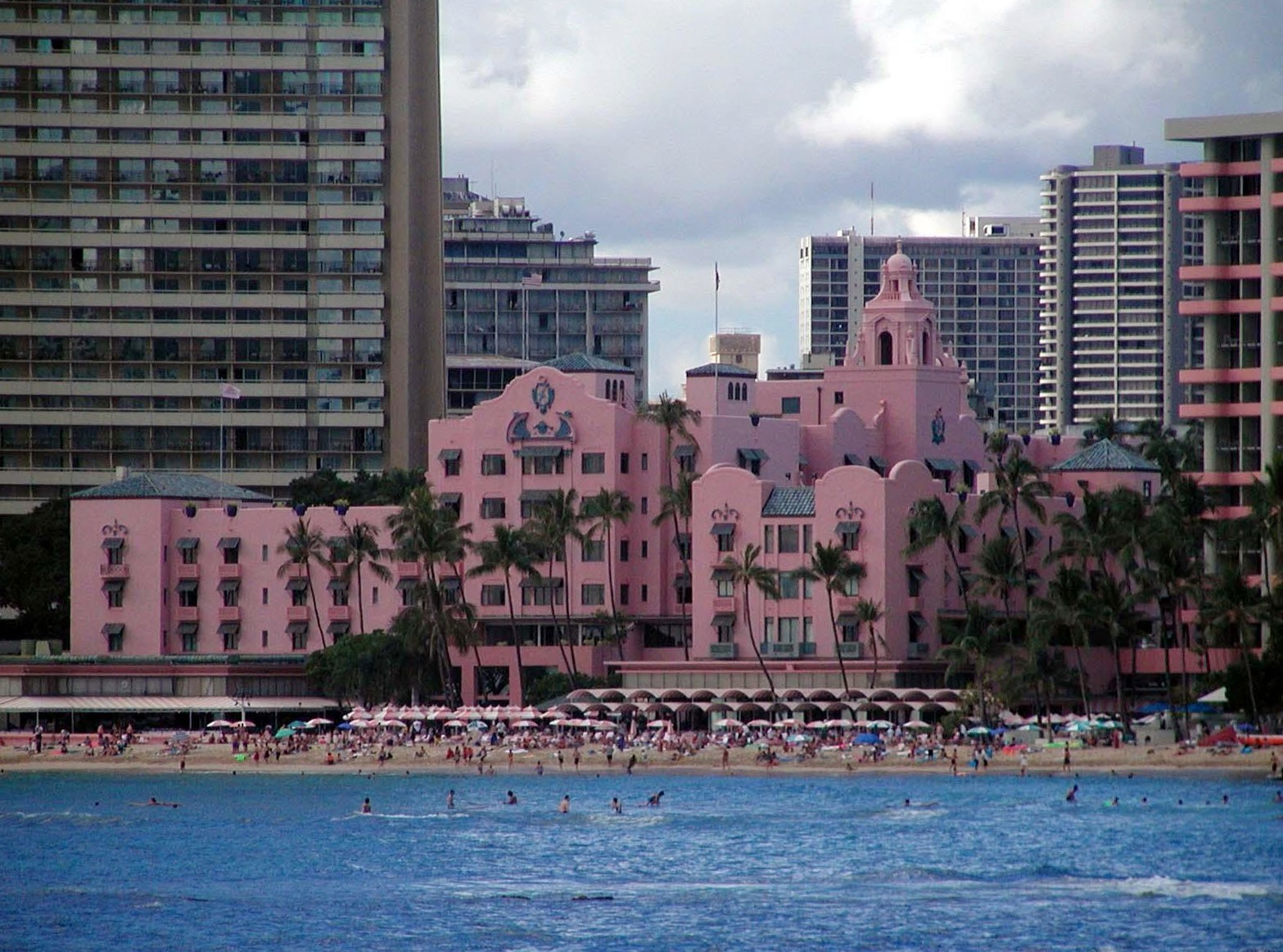
The Royal Hawaiian Hotel in Honolulu, Hawaii, built in 1927, was the first hotel on Waikiki Beach. Its pink color was designed to match an exotic setting, and to contrast with the blue of the sea and green of the landscape.

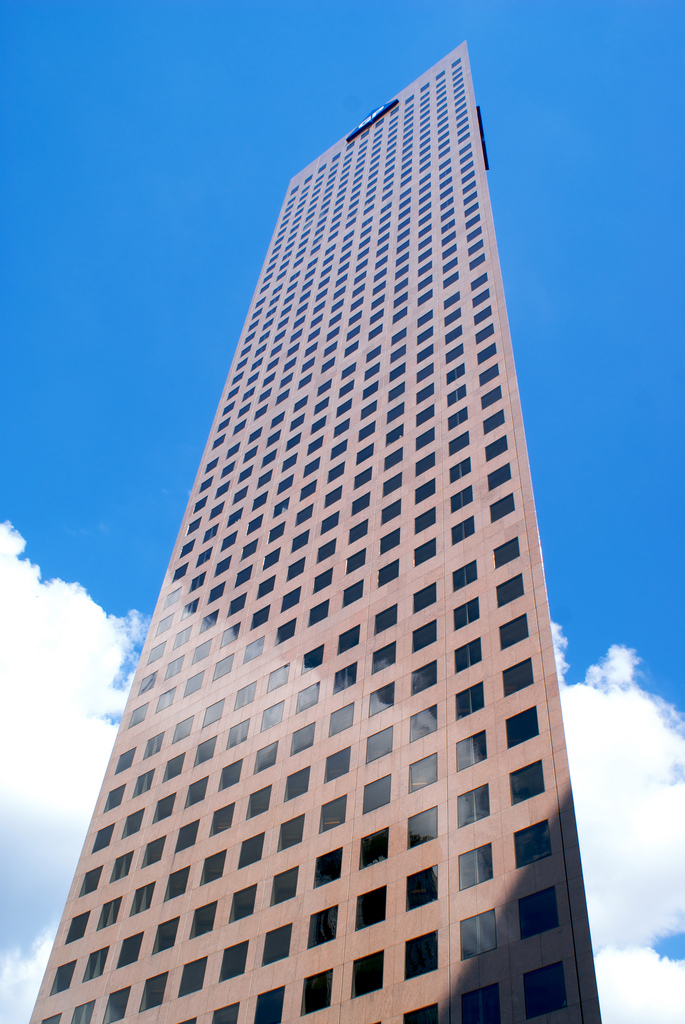
The Georgia-Pacific Tower in Atlanta, Georgia (1981), a modernist pink skyscraper.

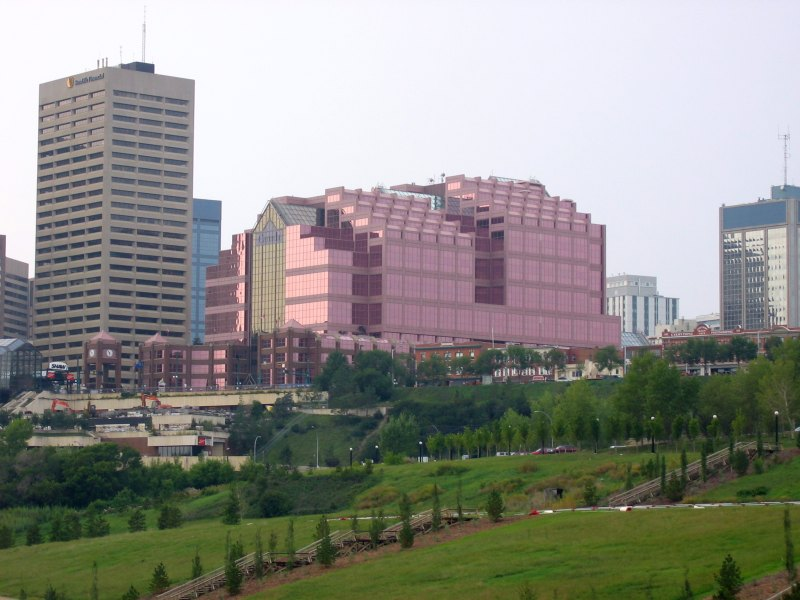
Canada Place Building, in Edmonton, Alberta, Canada (1988) a post-modernist style government office building.

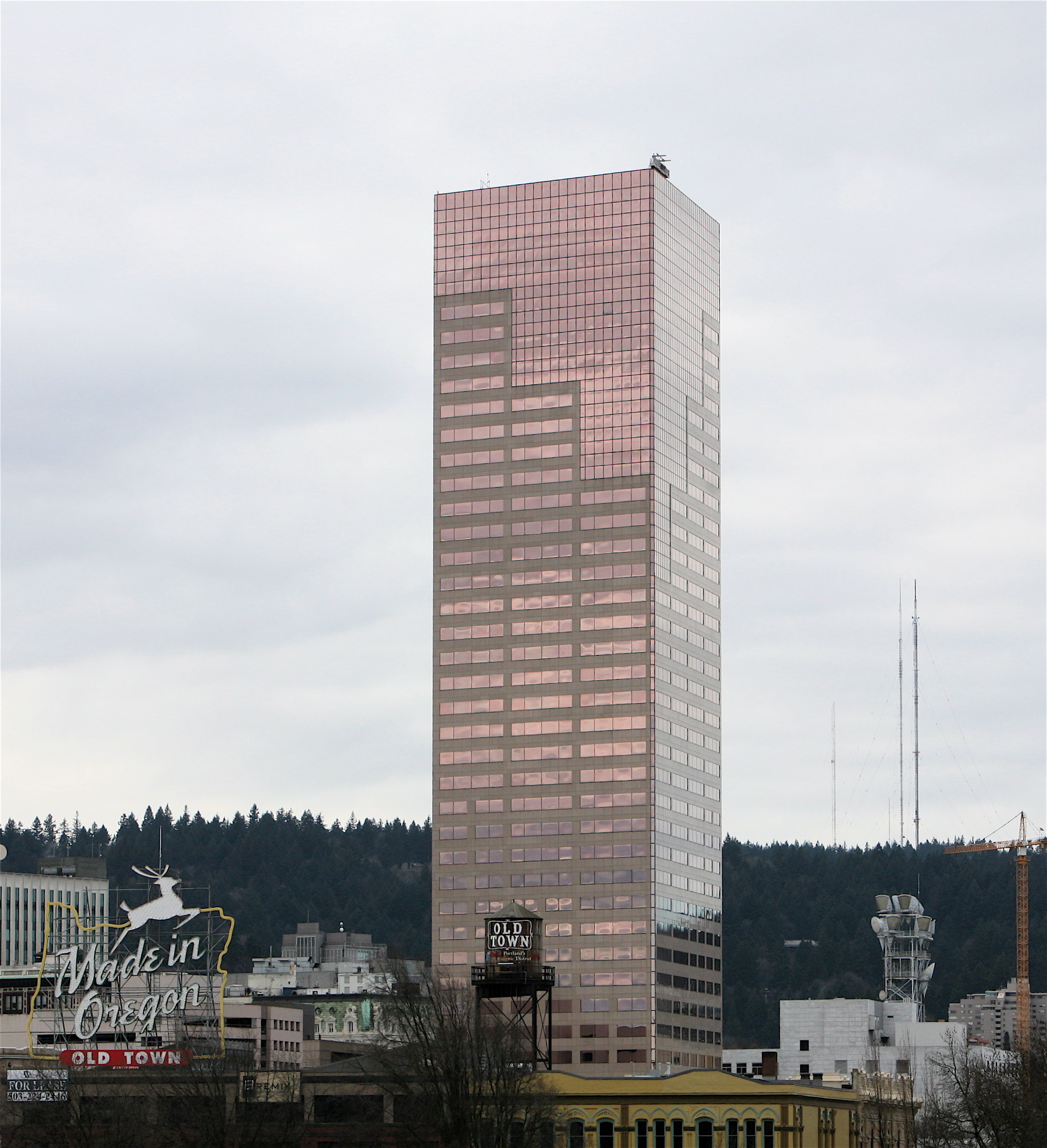
The US Bancorp Tower in Portland, Oregon, also known as "Big Pink", pink granite and windows (1983)

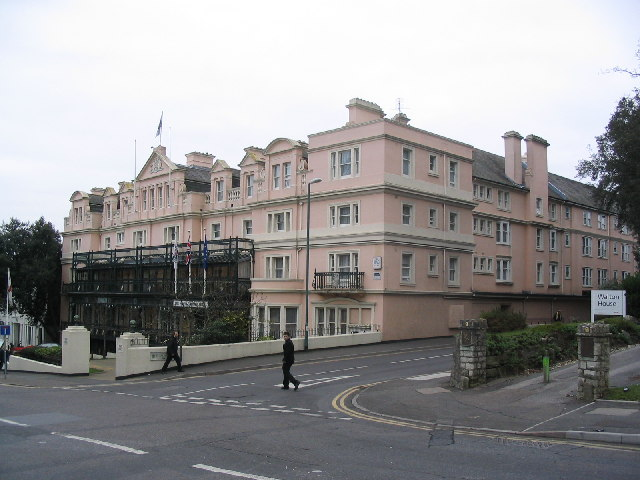
The Norfolk Royale Hotel in Bournemouth, England was built between 1840 and 1850.

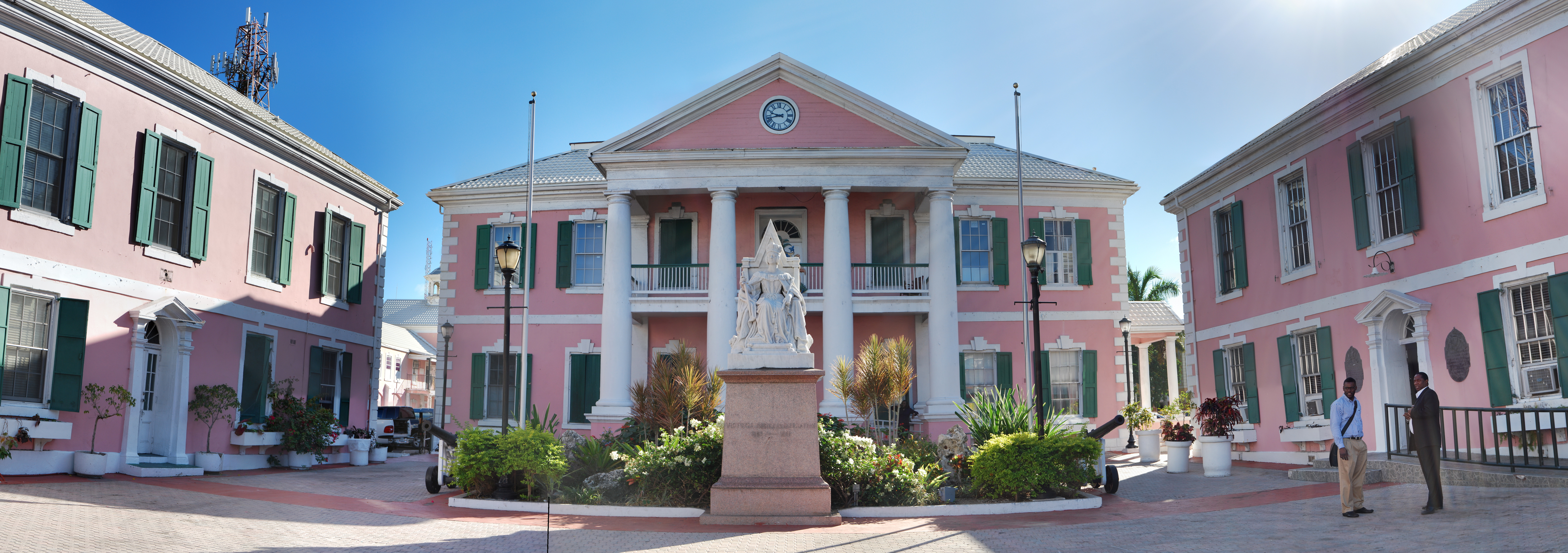
The Bahamian Parliament Building was built in 1815.

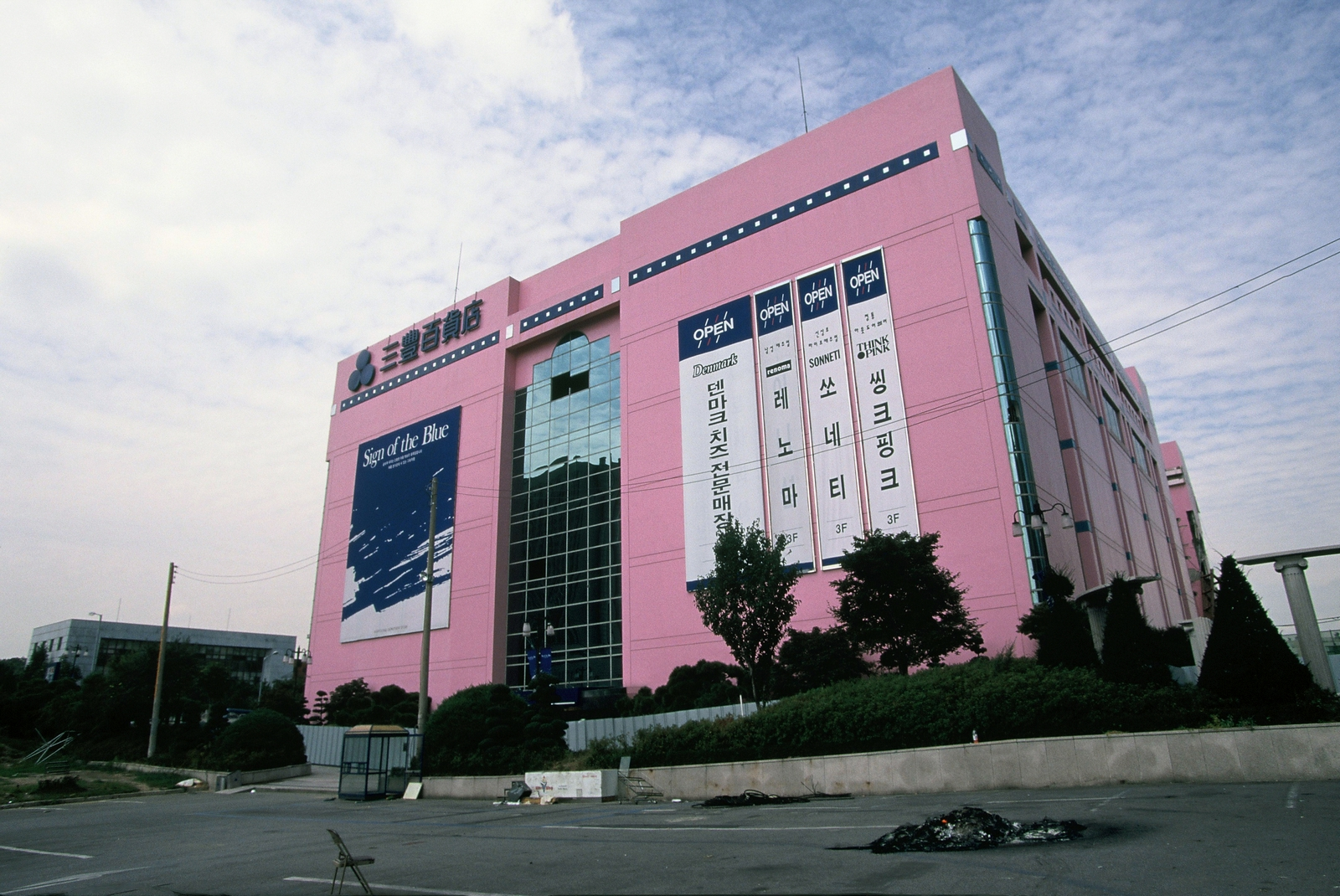
The Sampoong Department Store in Seoul, South Korea (1987 to 1995)

Necessidades Palace, headquarters of the Portuguese Foreign Ministry. It served previously as a royal residence.

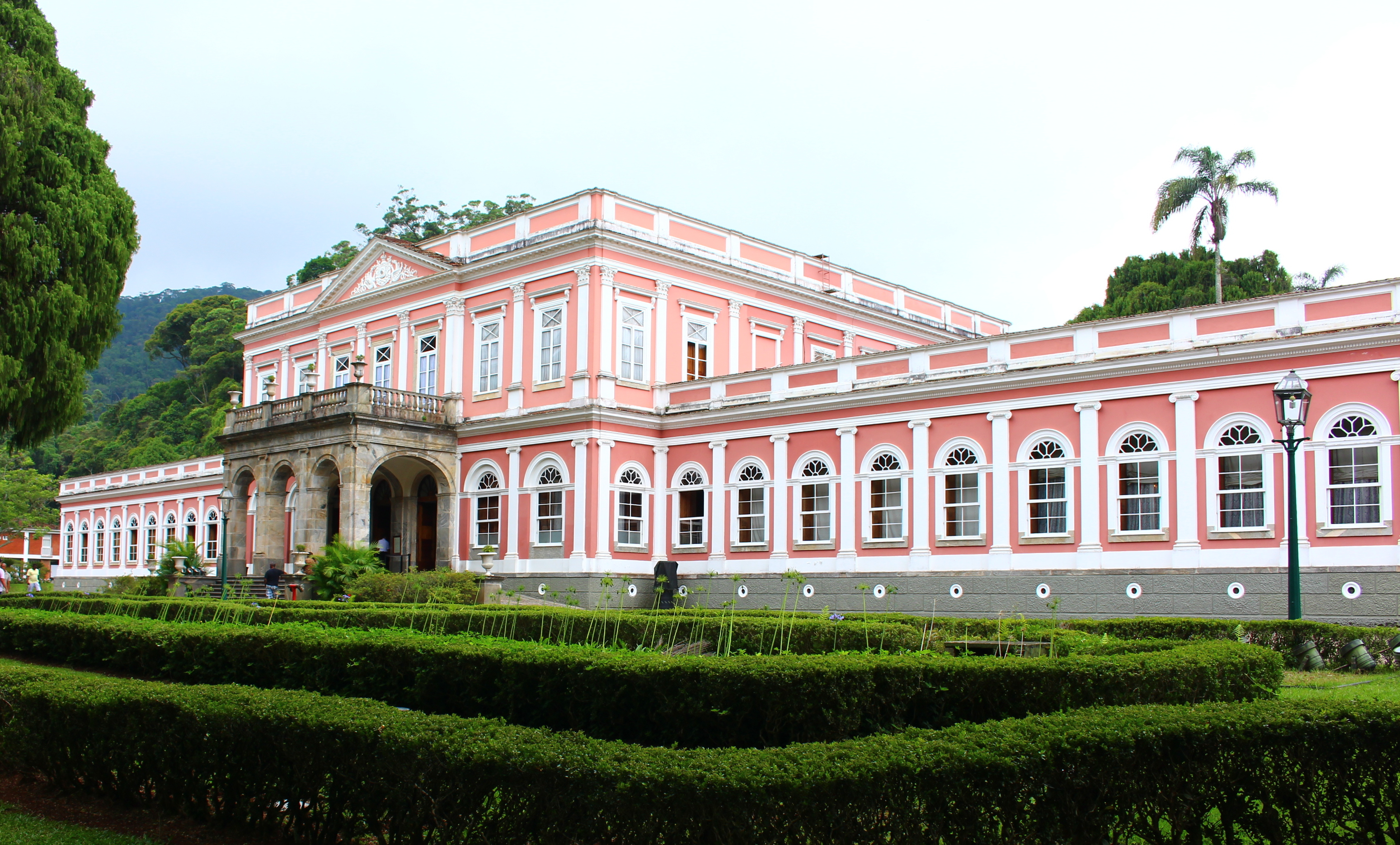
The Imperial Museum of Brazil. Formerly used as the summer residence by the Brazilian imperial family.

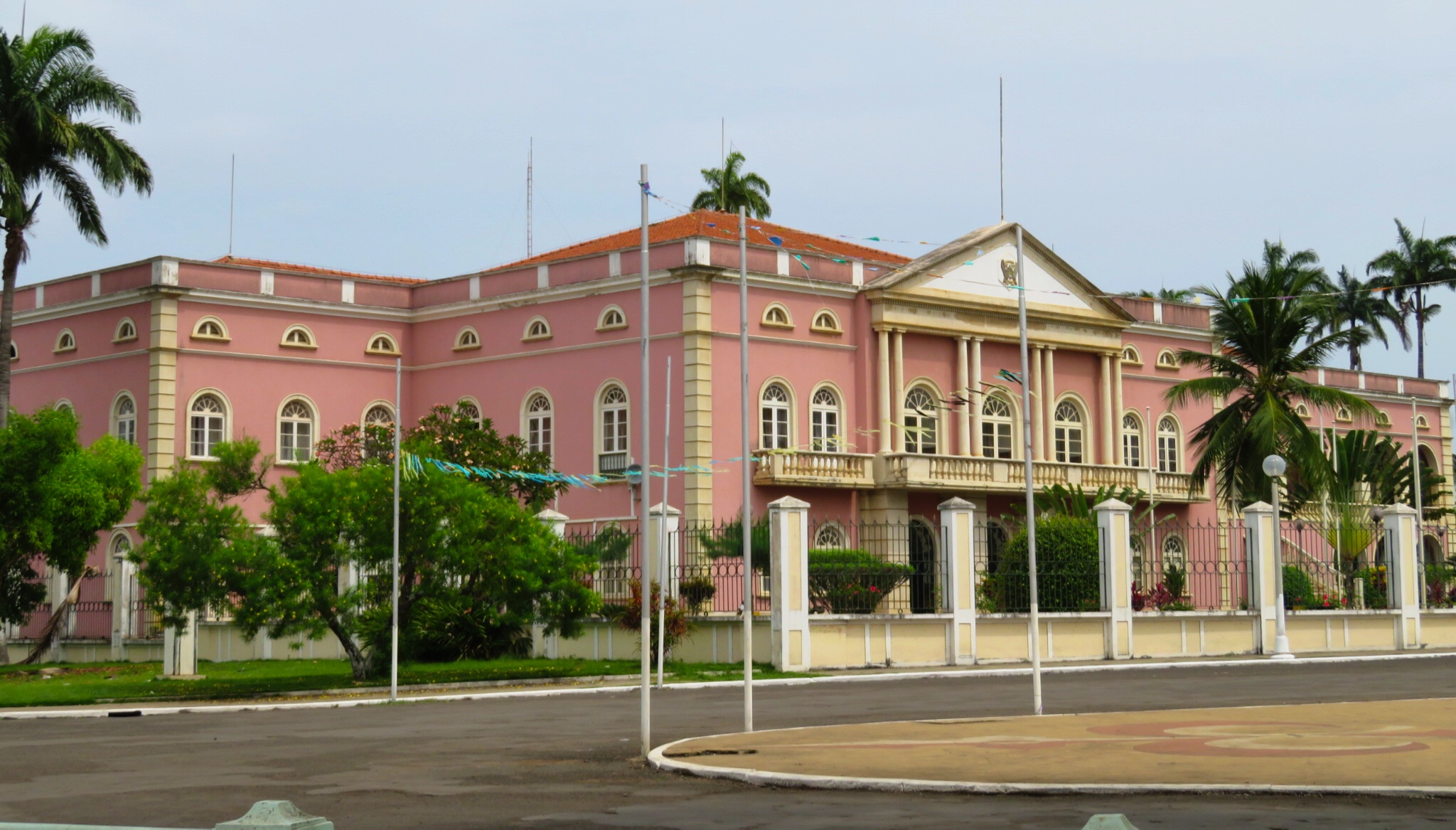
The Presidential Palace of São Tomé, built in the late 19th century.

=== Food and beverages ===
According to surveys in Europe and the United States, pink is the color most associated with sweet foods and beverages. Pink is also one of the few colors to be strongly associated with a particular aroma, that of roses. Many strawberry and raspberry-flavored foods are colored pink and light red as well, sometimes to distinguish them from cherry-flavored foods that are more commonly colored dark red (although raspberry-flavored foods, particularly in the United States, are often colored blue as well). The drink Tab was packaged in pink cans, presumably to subconsciously convey a sweet taste.

The pink color in most packaged and processed foods, ice creams, candies and pastries is made with artificial food coloring. The most common pink food coloring is erythrosine, also known as Red No. 3, an organoiodine compound, a derivative of fluorone, which is a cherry-pink synthetic. It is usually listed on package labels as E-127. Another common red or pink (particularly in the United States where erythrosine is less frequently used) is Allura Red AC (E-129), also known as Red No. 40. Some products use a natural red or pink food coloring, Cochineal, also called carmine, made with crushed insects of the family Dactylopius coccus.

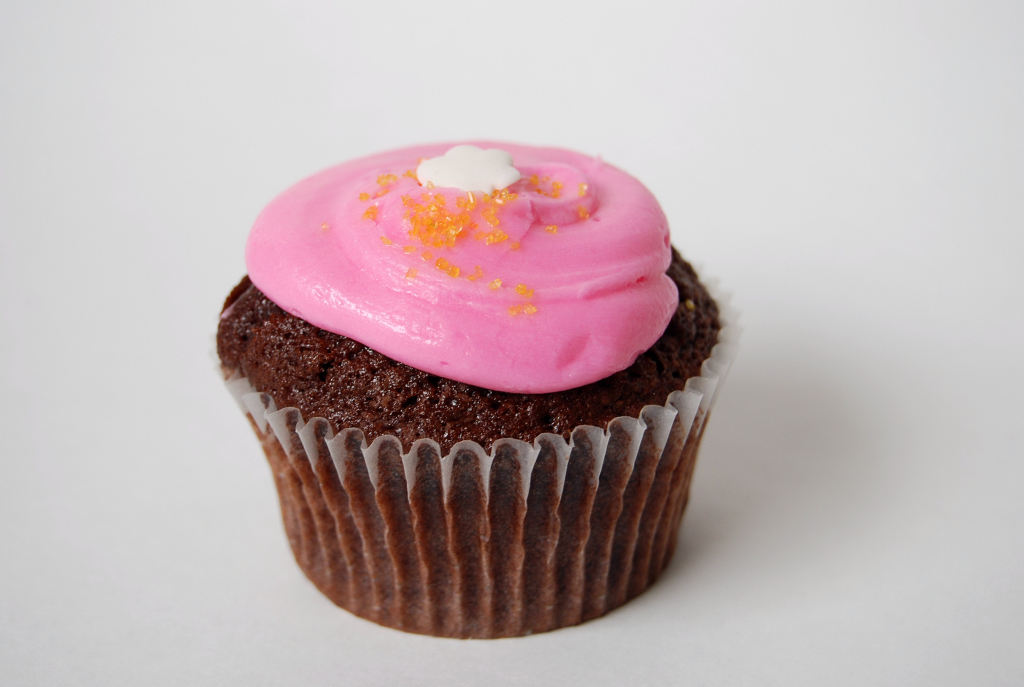
Pink is the color most commonly associated with sweet tastes

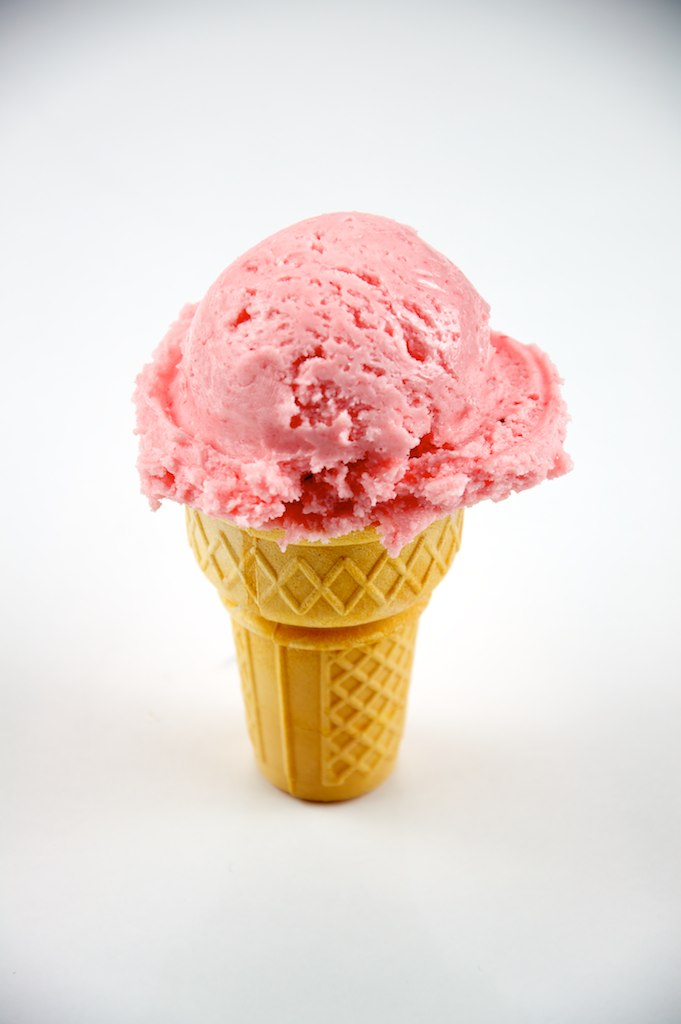
A strawberry ice cream cone

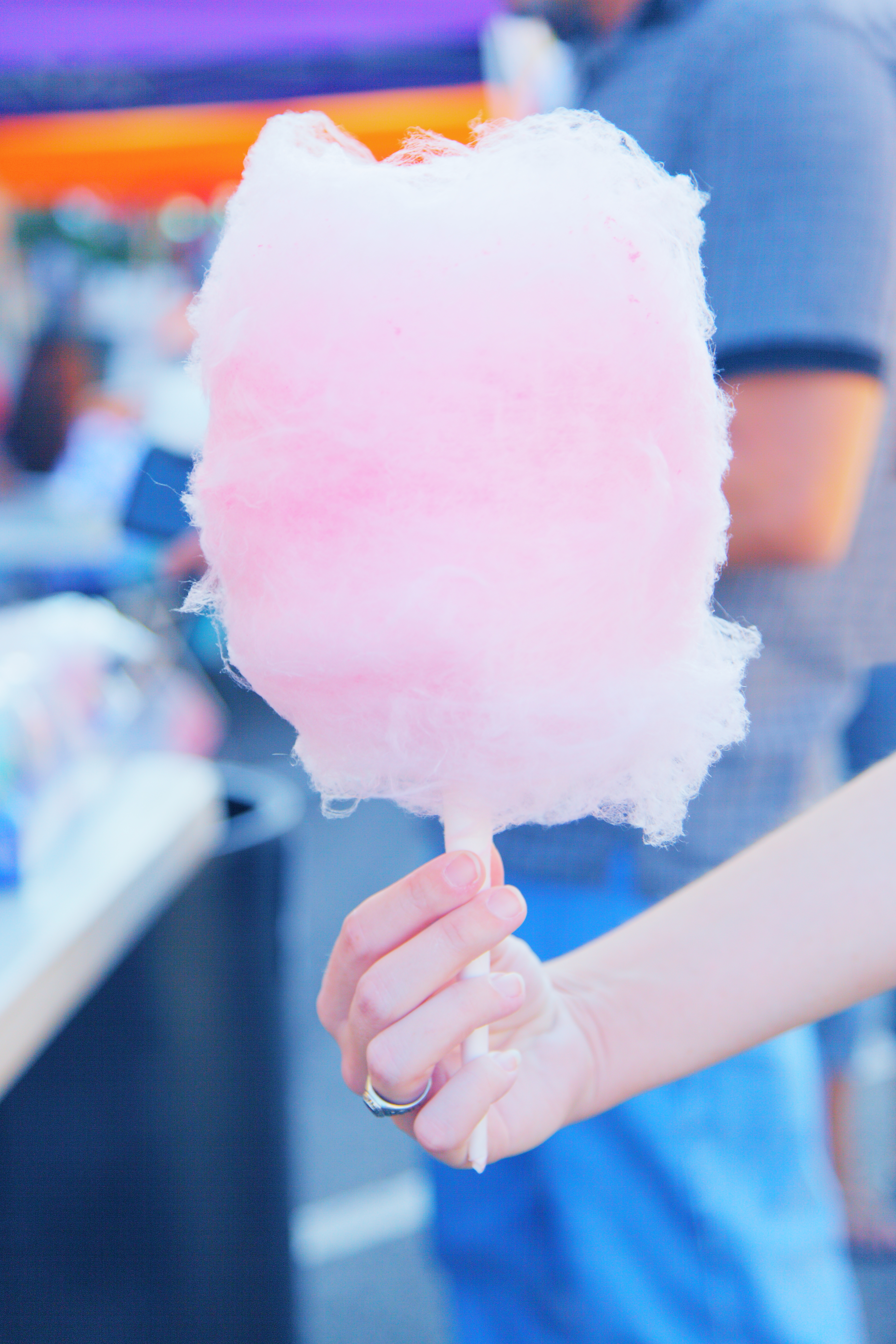
Cotton candy

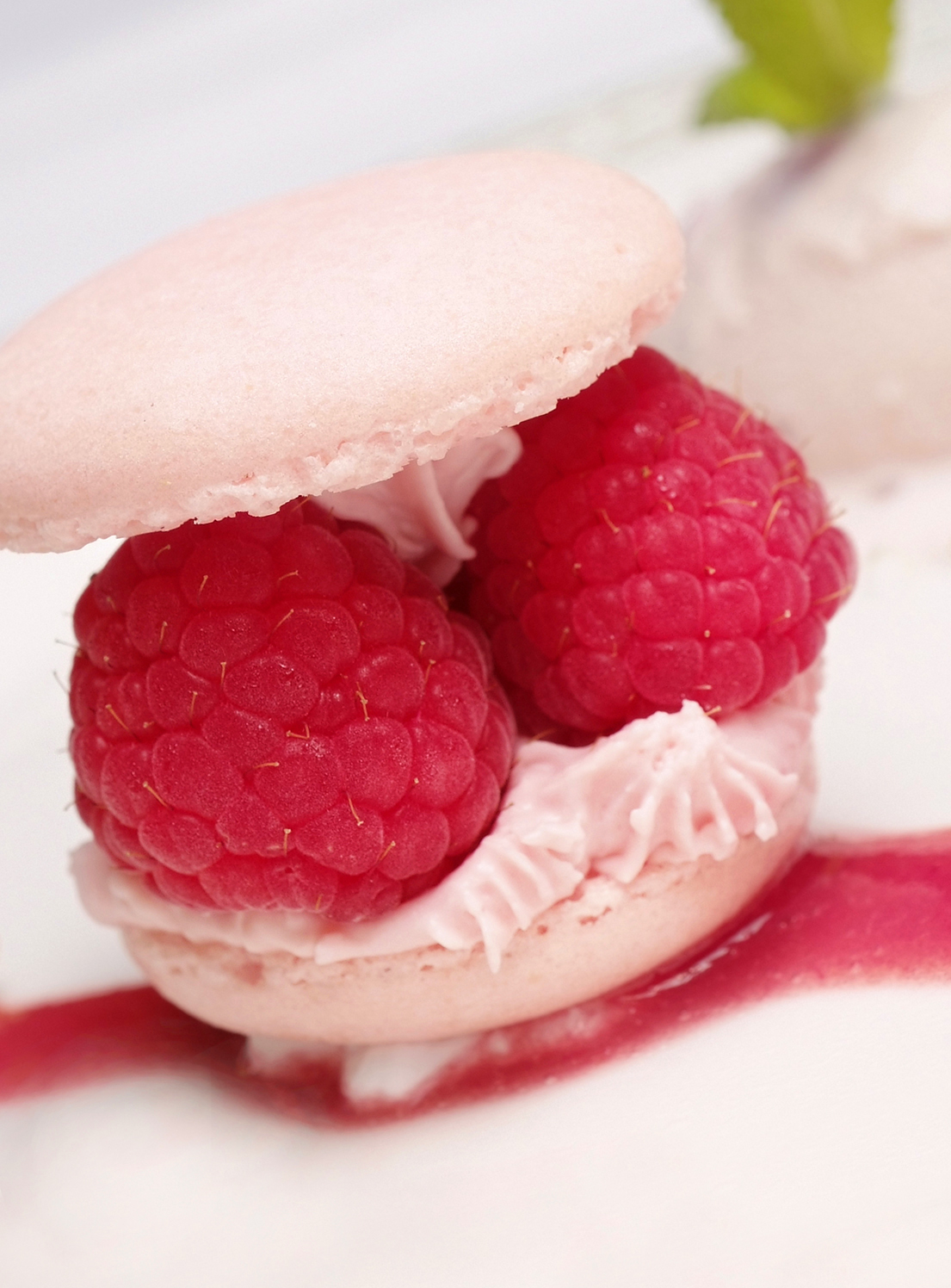
A macaron with raspberries

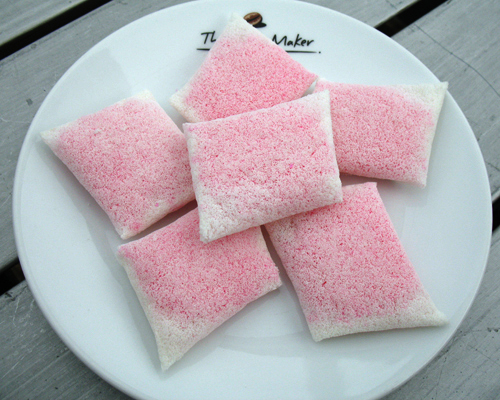
Bunga kuda (also known as bunga pundak) is a traditional dessert in Malaysia, containing a coconut filling

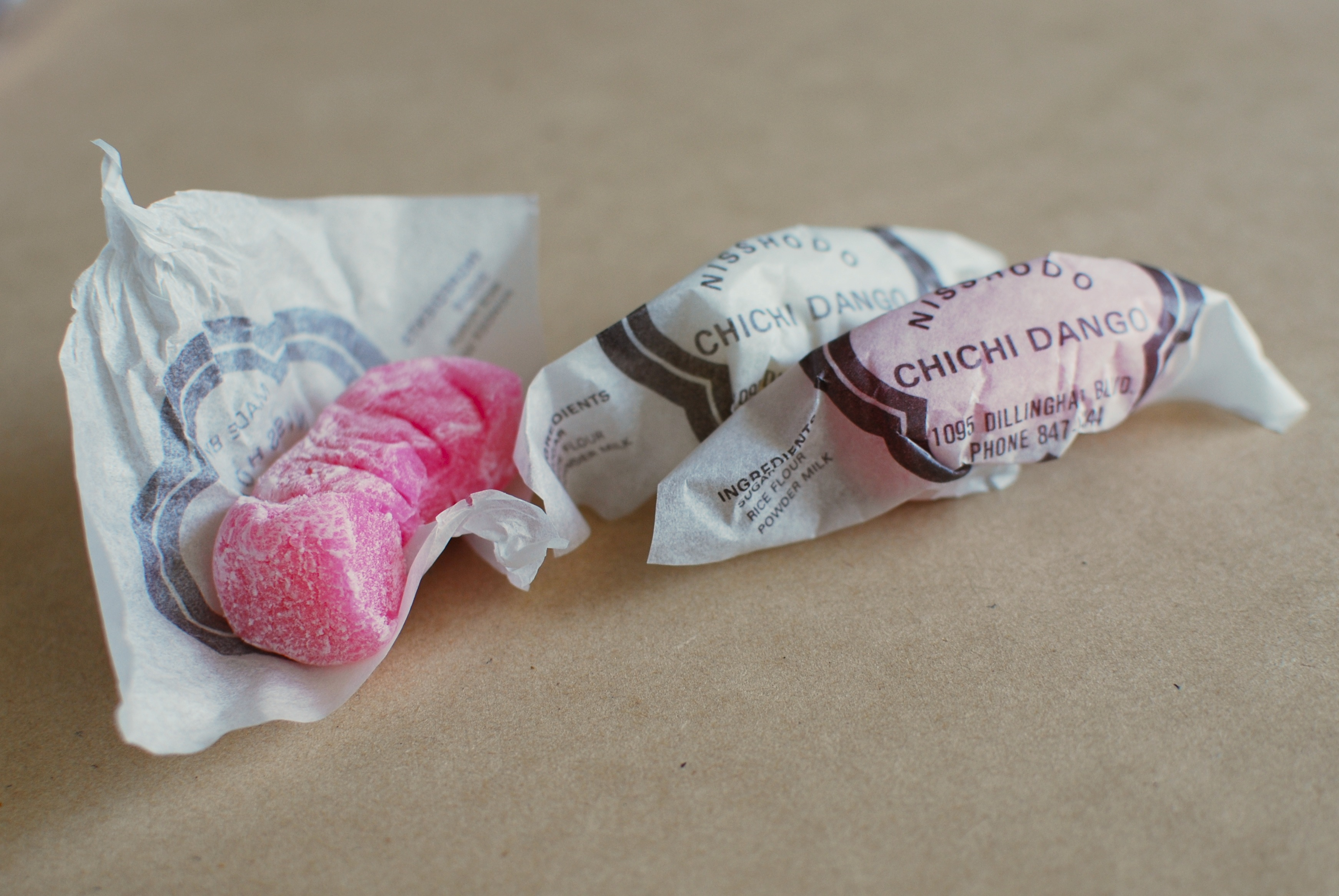
Chi chi dango is a sweet dessert made of rice flour. It is of Japanese origin, and very popular in Hawaii

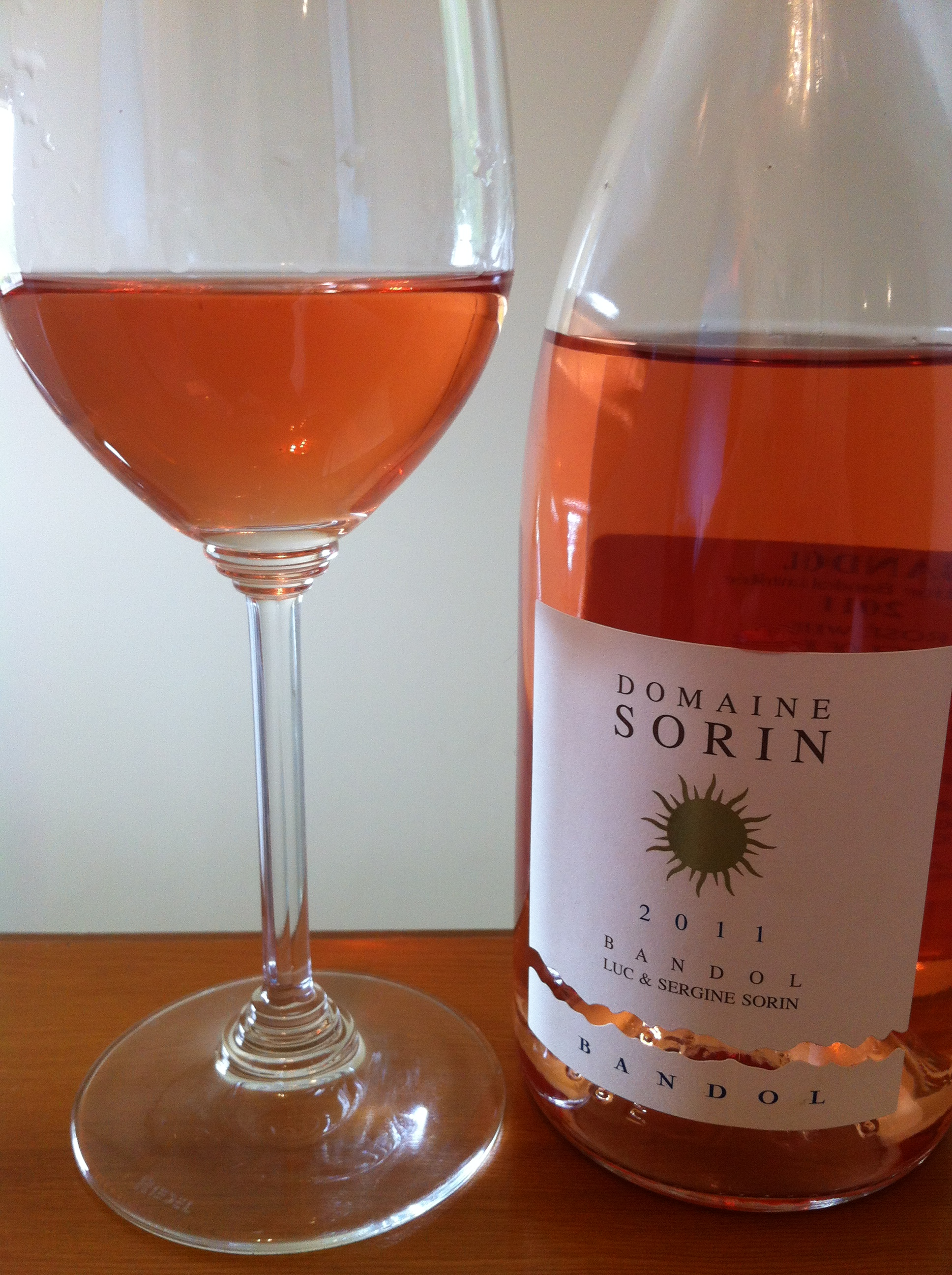
Traditional rosé wines get their color when temporarily fermented with dark purple grapeskins

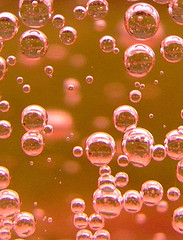
Pink champagne takes its color either when temporarily fermented with the skins of dark purple grapes, or by adding a small amount of red wine

=== Gender ===
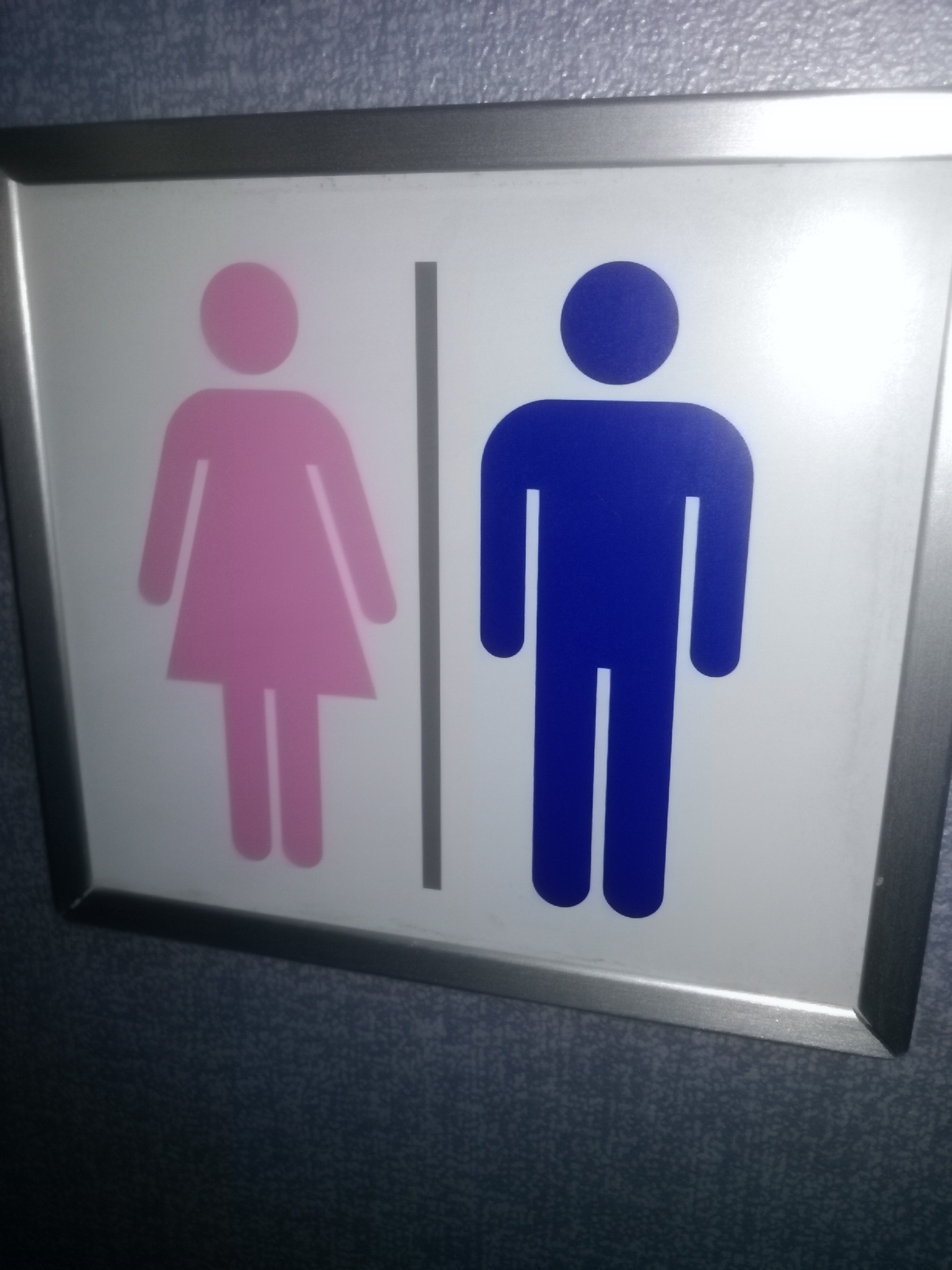
This restroom sign on an All Nippon Airways Boeing 767-300 uses pink for the female gender

In Europe and the United States, pink is often associated with girls, while blue is associated with boys. These colors were first used as gender markers just prior to World War I (for either girls or boys), and pink was first established as a female gender indicators in the 1940s. In the 20th century, the practice in Europe varied from country to country, with some assigning colors based on the baby's complexion, and others assigning pink sometimes to boys and sometimes to girls.

Many have noted the contrary association of pink with boys in 20th-century America. An article in the trade publication Earnshaw's Infants' Department in June 1918 said:

The generally accepted rule is pink for the boys, and blue for the girls. The reason is that pink, being a more decided and stronger color, is more suitable for the boy, while blue, which is more delicate and dainty, is prettier for the girl.

One reason for the increased use of pink for girls and blue for boys was the invention of new chemical dyes, which meant that children's clothing could be mass-produced and washed in hot water without fading. Prior to this time, most small children of both sexes wore white, which could be frequently washed. Another factor was the popularity of blue and white sailor suits for young boys, a fashion that started in the late 19th century. Blue was also the usual color of school uniforms, for boys and girls. Blue was associated with seriousness and study, while pink was associated with childhood and softness.

By the 1950s, pink was strongly associated with femininity, but to an extent that was "neither rigid nor universal" as it later became.

One study by two neuroscientists in Current Biology examined color preferences across British and Chinese cultures and found significant differences between male and female responses. Both groups favored blues over other hues, but women had more favorable responses to the reddish-purple range of the spectrum and men had more favorable responses to the greenish-yellow middle of the spectrum. Despite the fact that the study used adults in mainstream cultures, and both groups preferred blues, and responses to the color pink were never even tested, the popular press represented the research as an indication of an innate preference by girls for pink. The misreading has been often repeated in market research, reinforcing American culture's association of pink with girls on the basis of imagined innate characteristics.

As of 2008 various feminist groups and the Breast Cancer Awareness Month use the color pink to convey empowerment of women. Breast cancer charities around the world have used the color to symbolize support for people with breast cancer and promote awareness of the disease. A key tactic of these charities is encouraging women and men to wear pink to show their support for breast cancer awareness and research.

Pink has symbolized a "welcome embrace" in India and masculinity in Japan.

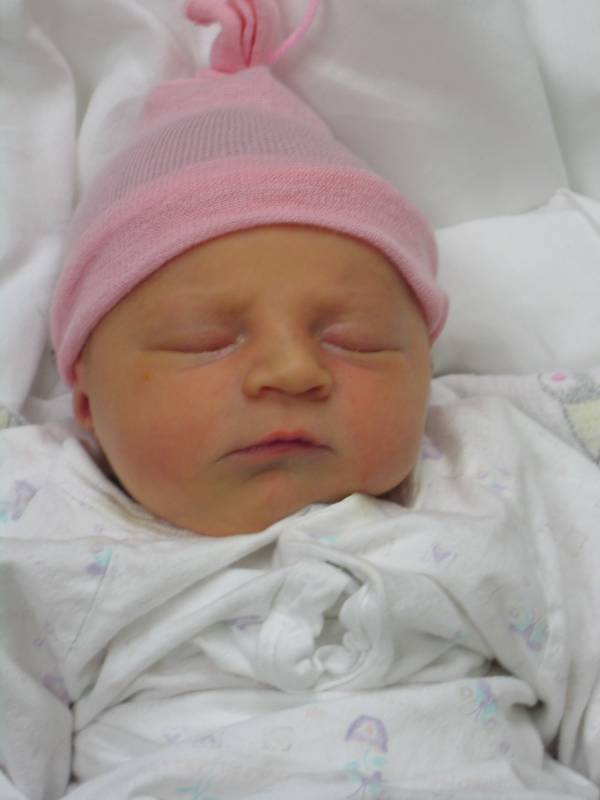
In the United States and Europe, baby girls are often dressed in pink and white.

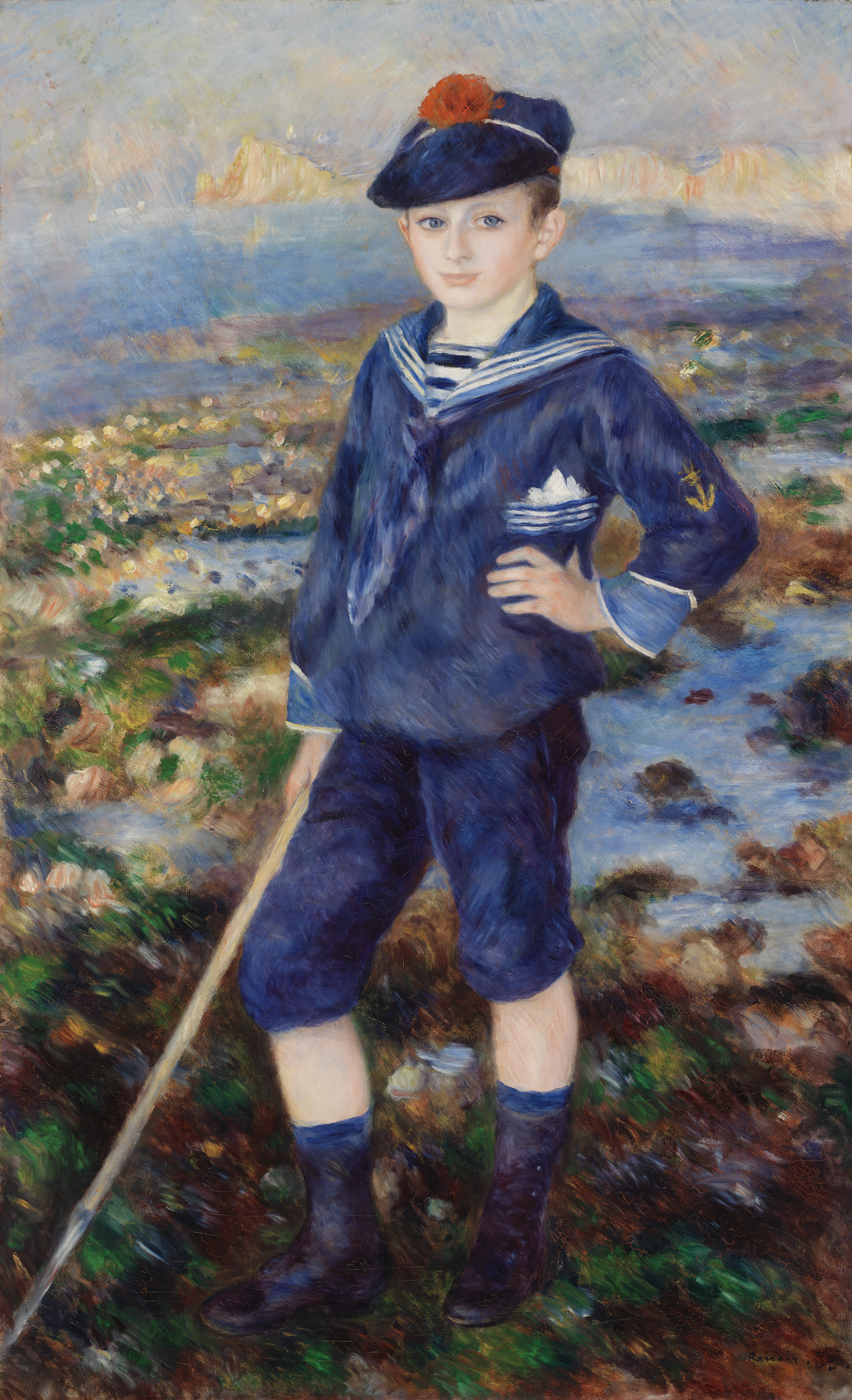
Boy in a sailor suit (1883). The blue sailor suit helped make blue instead of pink the color for boys in the 20th century.

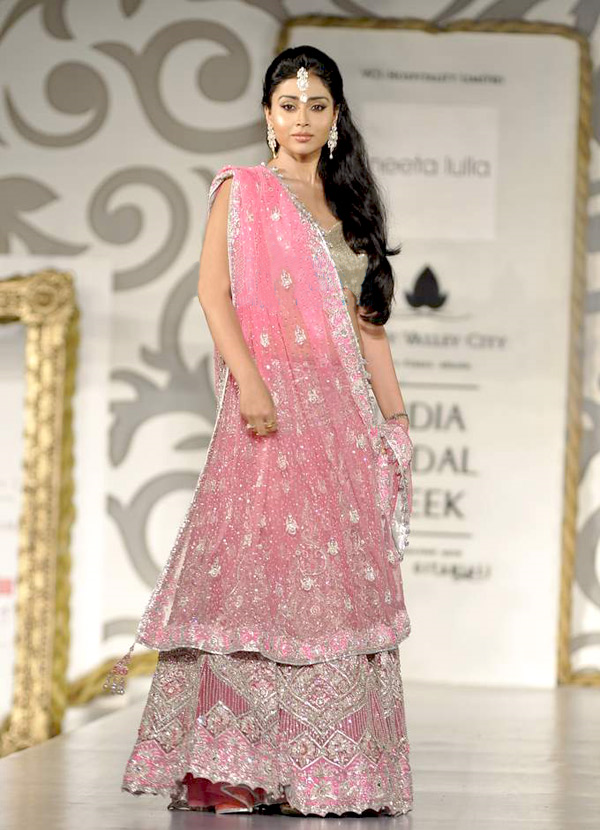
Indian actress Shriya Saran. In many cultures, pink is associated with femininity.

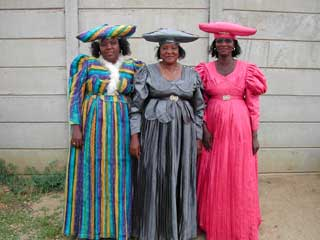
Women of the Herero people from Namibia. Pink stands out.

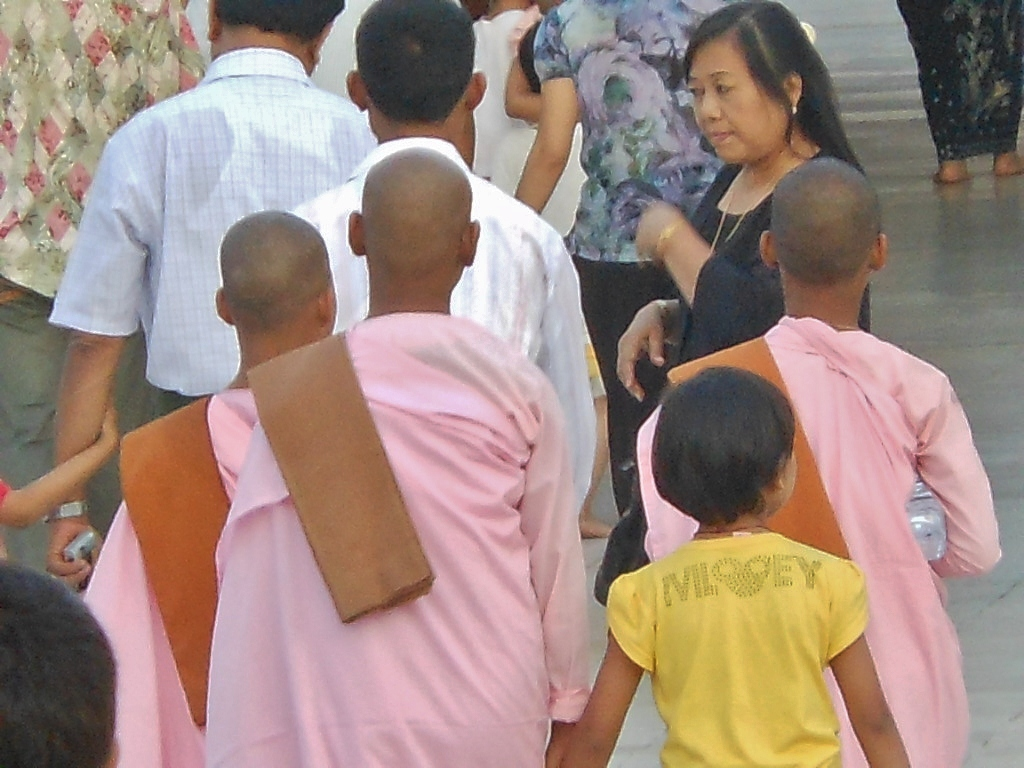
Three nuns in pink in Yangon, Burma.

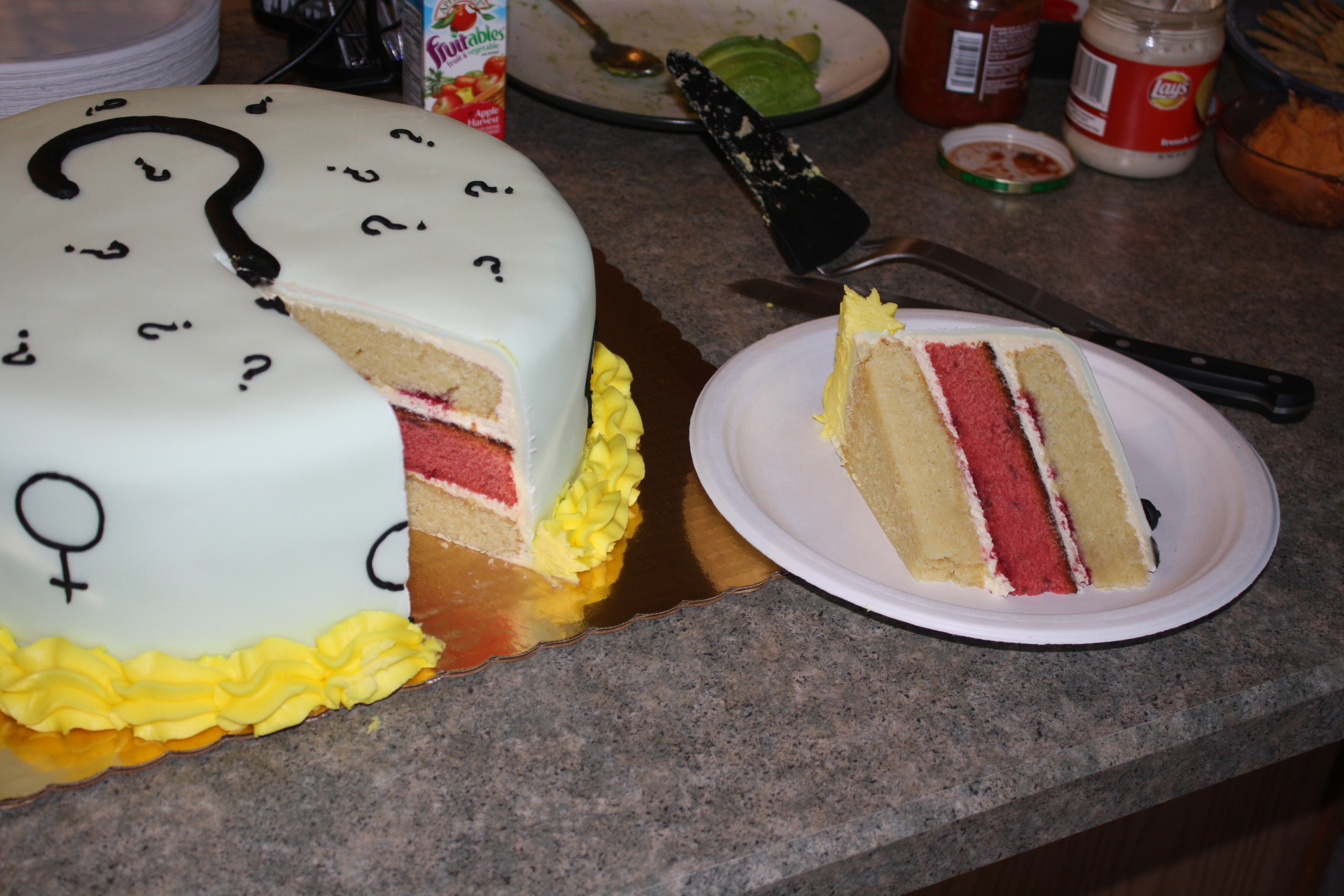
A cake with a pink middle layer indicating a baby girl at a gender reveal party

=== Toys ===
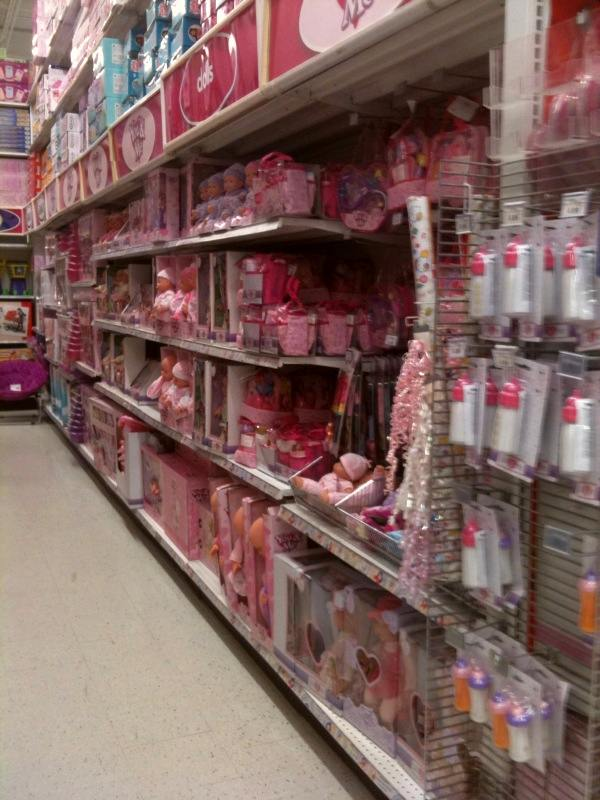
Rows of pink girls' toys in a Canadian store, 2011

Toys aimed at girls often display pink prominently on packaging and the toy themselves. This is a relatively recent trend, with toys from the 1920s to the 1960s not being gendered by color (though they were gendered by a focus on domesticity and nurturing). The current color-based gendering of toys can be traced back to the deregulation of children's television programs. This allowed toy companies to produce shows that were designed specifically to sell their products, and gender was an important differentiator of these shows and the toys they were advertising.

In its 1957 catalog, Lionel Trains offered for sale a pink model freight train for girls. The steam locomotive and coal car were pink and the freight cars of the freight train were various pastel colors. The caboose was baby blue. It was a marketing failure because any girl who might want a model train would want a realistically colored train, while boys in the 1950s did not want to be seen playing with a pink train. However, today it is a valuable collector's item.

=== Politics ===
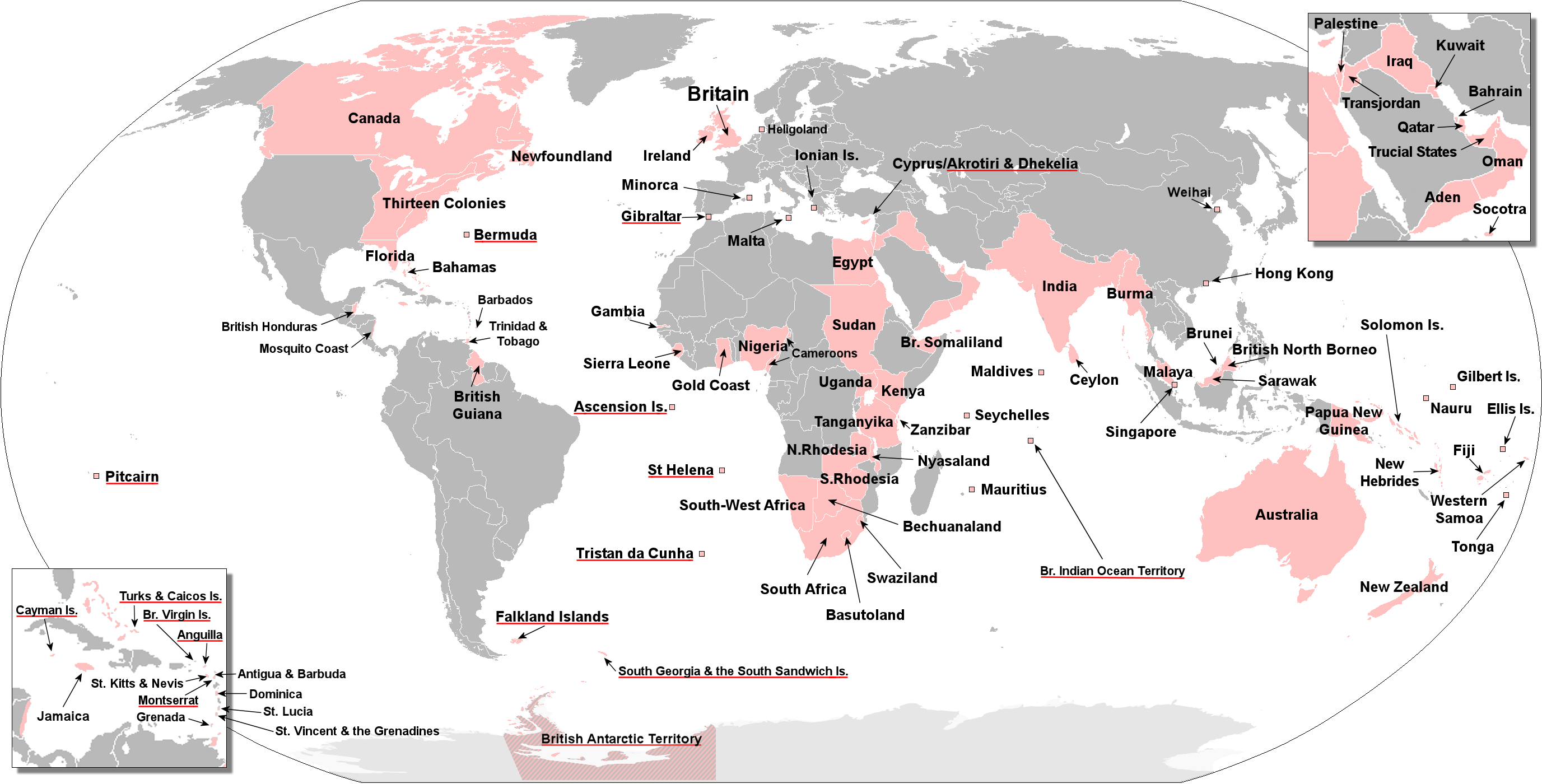
It was a common practice to color British Empire pink on maps

- Pink, being a 'watered-down' red, is sometimes used in a derogatory way to describe a person with mild communist or socialist beliefs (see Pinko).
- The term little pink (小粉红) is used to describe the young nationalists on the internet in mainland China.
- The term pink revolution is sometimes used to refer to the overthrow of President Askar Akayev and his government in the Central Asian republic of Kyrgyzstan after the parliamentary elections of February 27 and March 13, 2005, although it is more commonly called the Tulip Revolution.
- The Swedish feminist party Feminist Initiative uses pink as their color.
- Code Pink is an American women's anti-globalization and anti-war group founded in 2002 by activist Medea Benjamin. The group has disrupted Congressional hearings and heckled President Obama at his public speeches.
- The TRS party of Telangana, India has pink as its primary color
- It was a common practice to color the British Empire pink on maps.
- Supporters of Philippine Presidential candidate and former Vice President Leni Robredo used pink to show their solidarity with her in her 2022 presidential campaign.

=== Social movements ===
Pink is often used as a symbolic color by groups involved in issues important to women, as well as to lesbian, gay, bisexual and transgender (LGBT) people.

- A Dutch newsgroup about homosexuality is called nl.roze (roze being the Dutch word for pink), while in Britain, Pink News is a gay newspaper and online news service. There is a magazine called Pink for the lesbian, gay, bisexual and transgender (LGBT) community which has different editions for various metropolitan areas. In France Pink TV is an LGBT cable channel.
- In Ireland, Support group for Irish Pink Adoptions defines a pink family as a relatively neutral umbrella term for the single gay men, single lesbians, or same-gender couples who intend to adopt, are in the process of adopting, or have adopted. It also covers adults born/raised in such families. The group welcome the input of other people touched by adoption, especially people who were adopted as children and are now adults.
- Pinkstinks, a campaign founded in London in May 2008 to raise awareness of what they claim is the damage caused by gender stereotyping of children.
- The Pink Pistols is a gay gun rights organization.
- The pink ribbon is the international symbol of breast cancer awareness. Pink was chosen partially because it is so strongly associated with femininity.
The pink ribbon has been a symbol of breast cancer awareness since 1991.

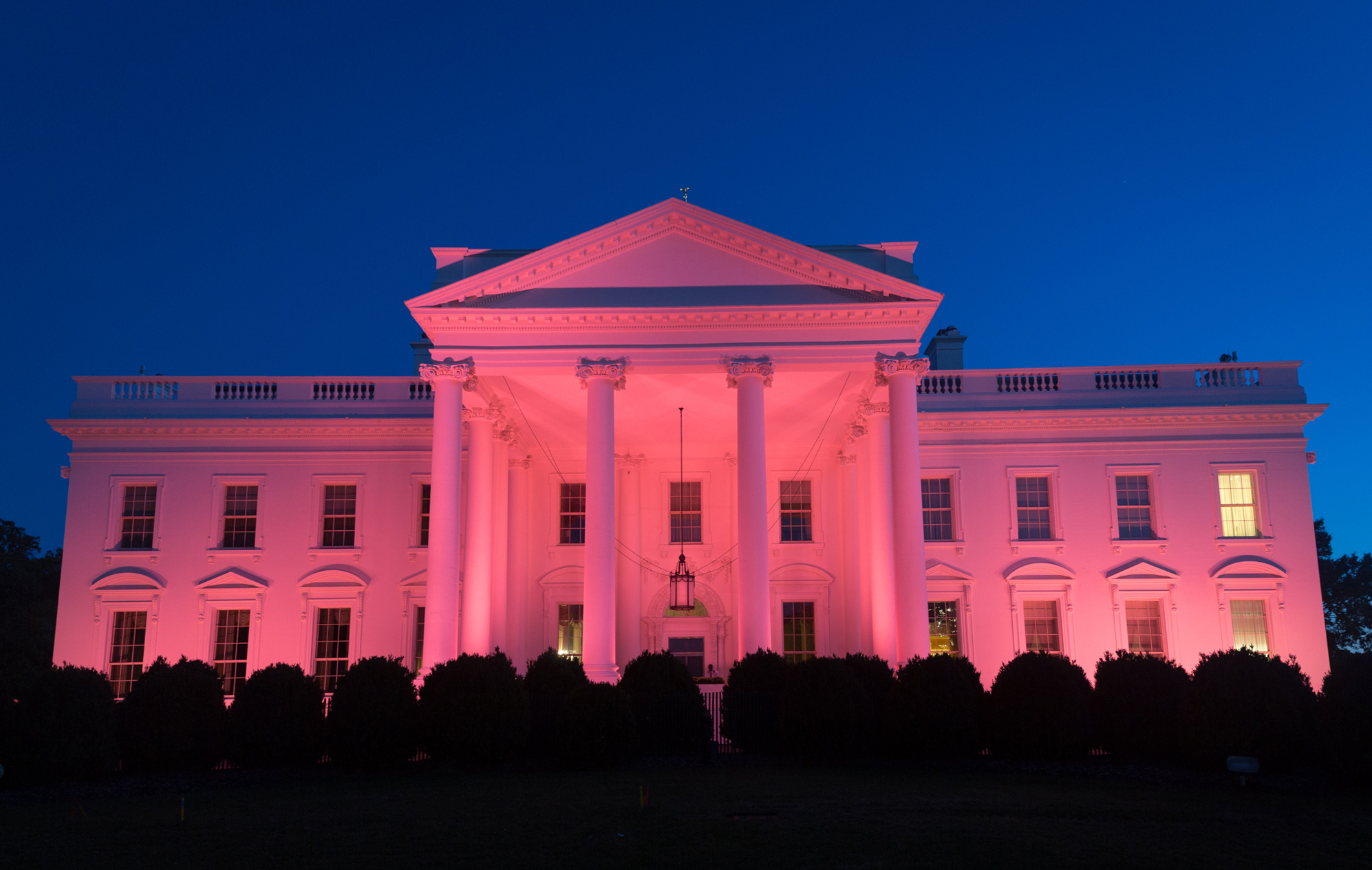
The White House illuminated in pink for Breast Cancer Awareness Month.

=== Technology ===
Pieces of consumer electronics, which are most often in monochrome colors, have also been made and released in pink, most often targeted at female customers. It has been noted that pink colored technology tends to be more expensive than the equivalent product in different colors.

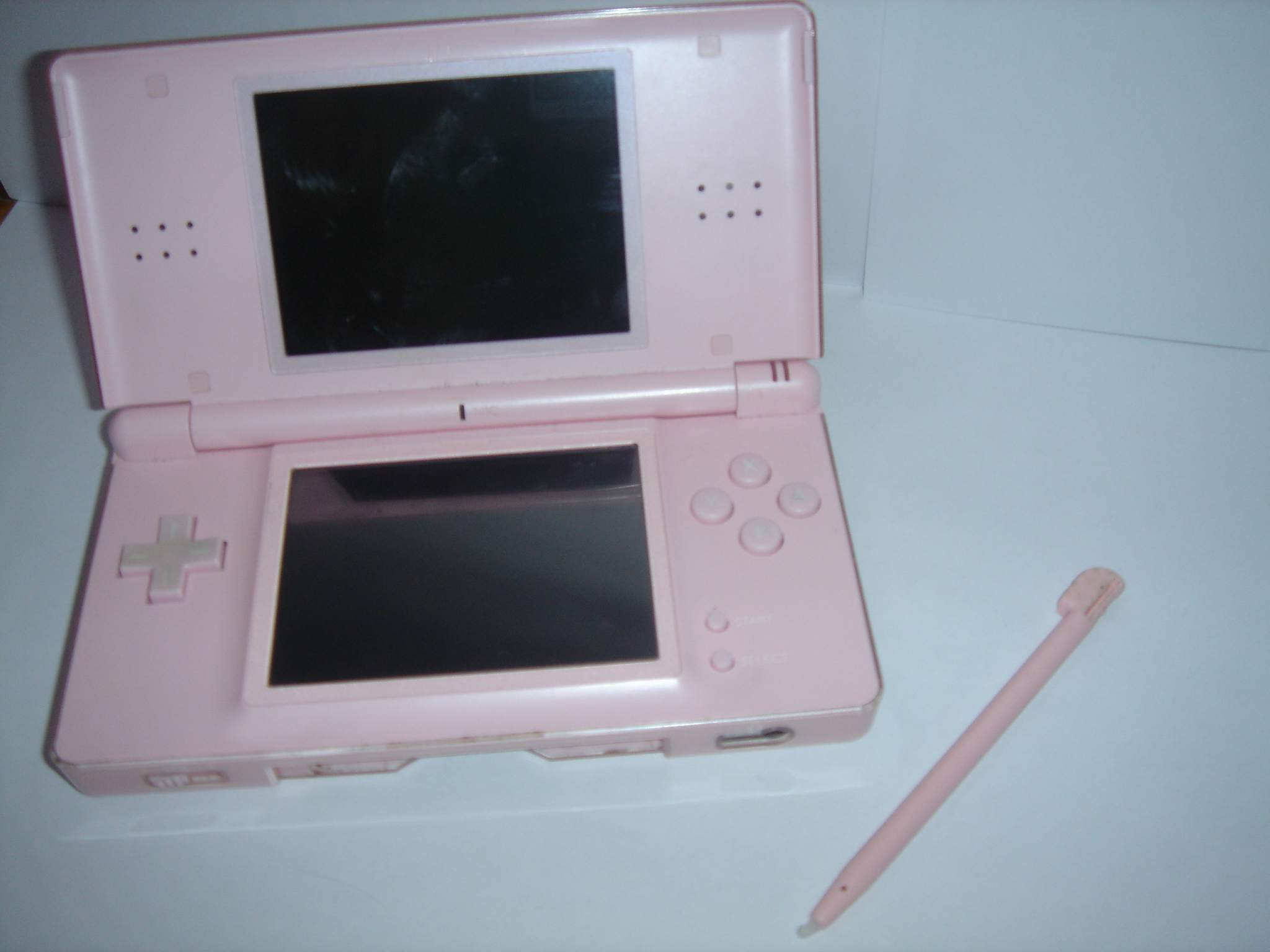
Nintendo DS Lite

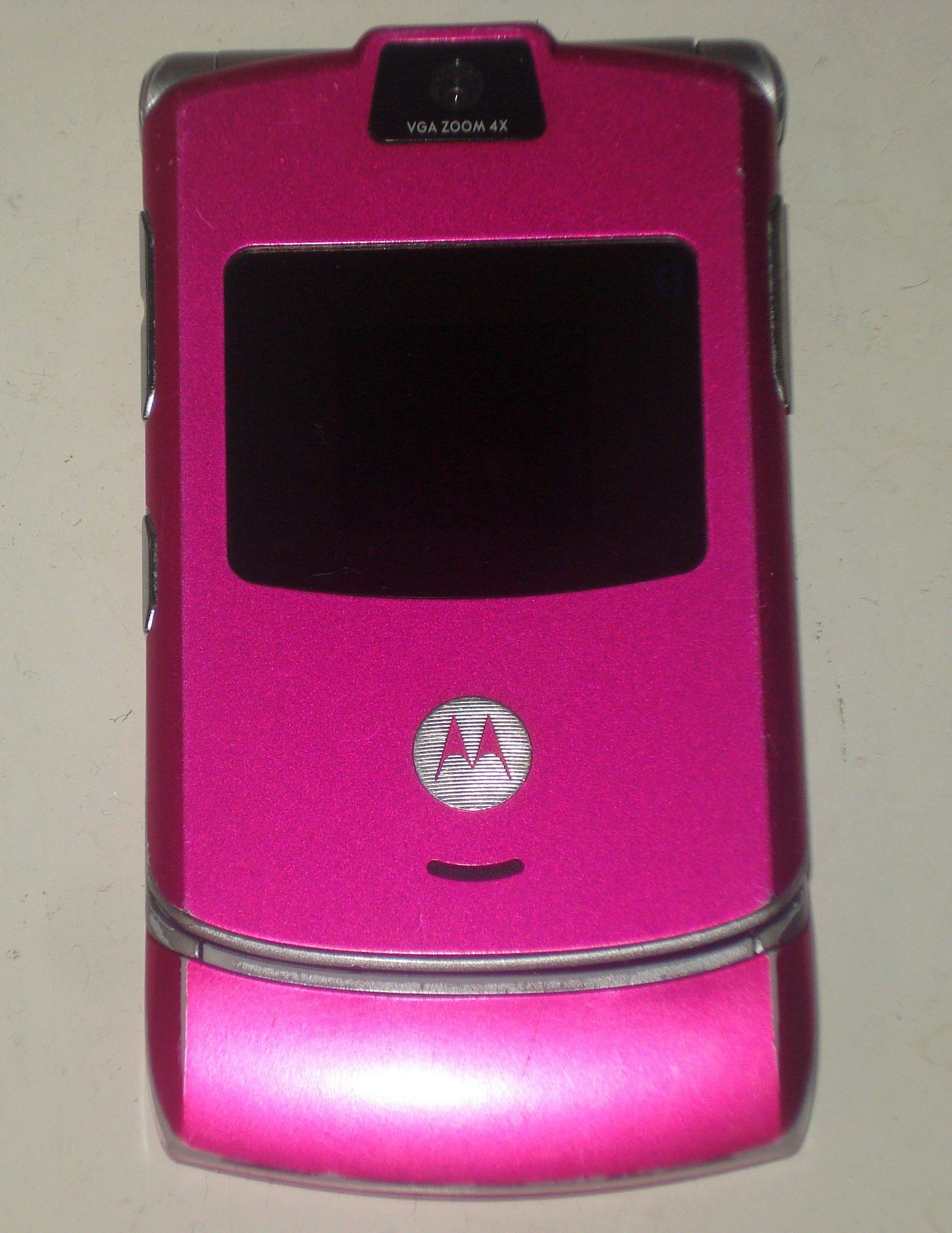
Hot pink colored Motorola RAZR V3

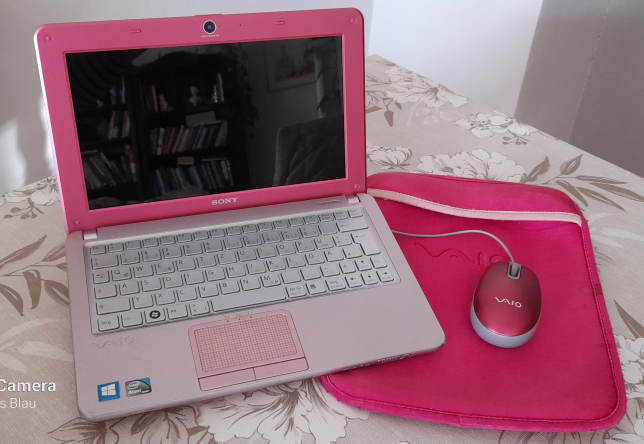
Sony Vaio W netbook computer with mouse in pink

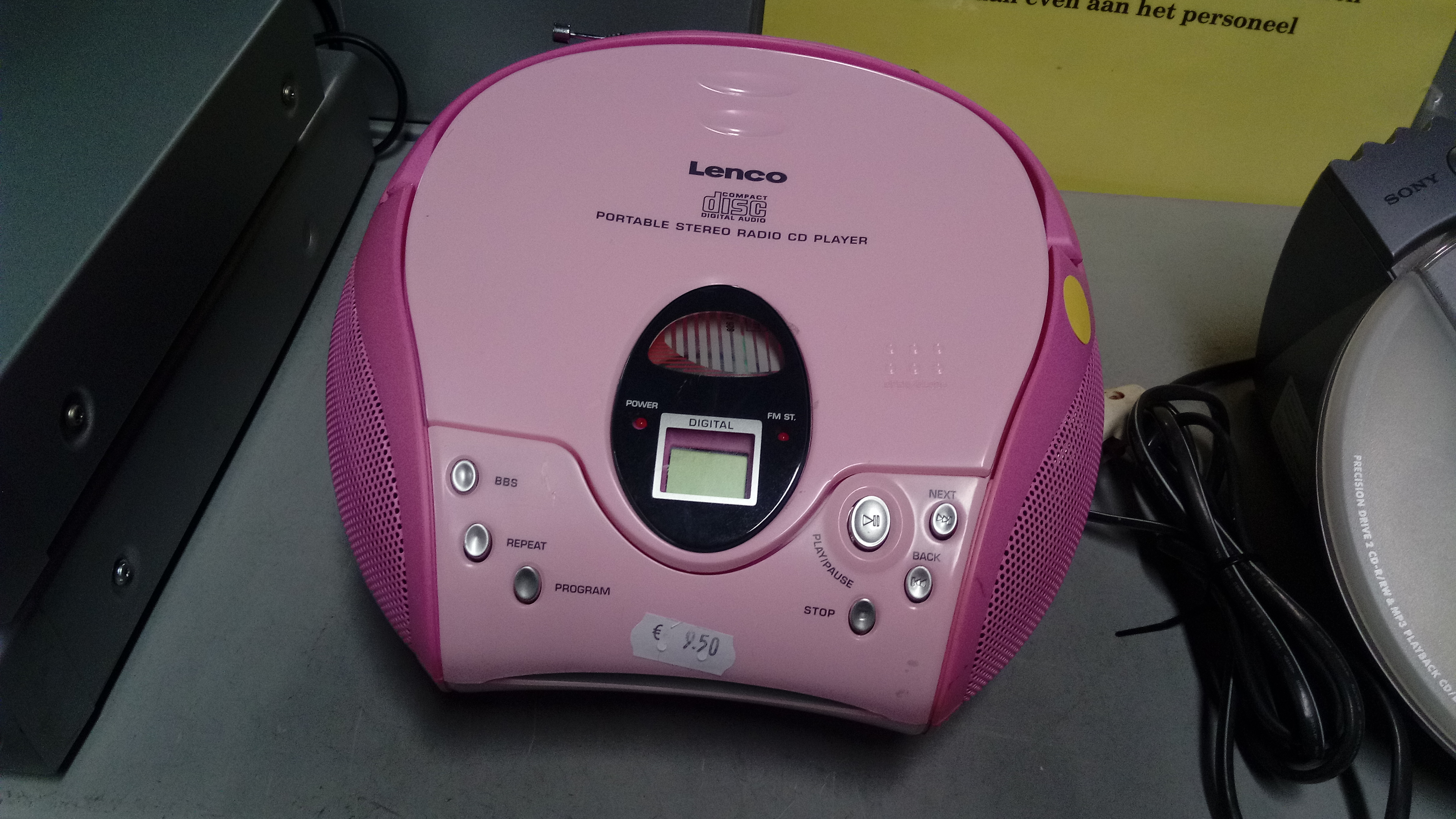
Lenco-branded radio and CD player boombox in pink

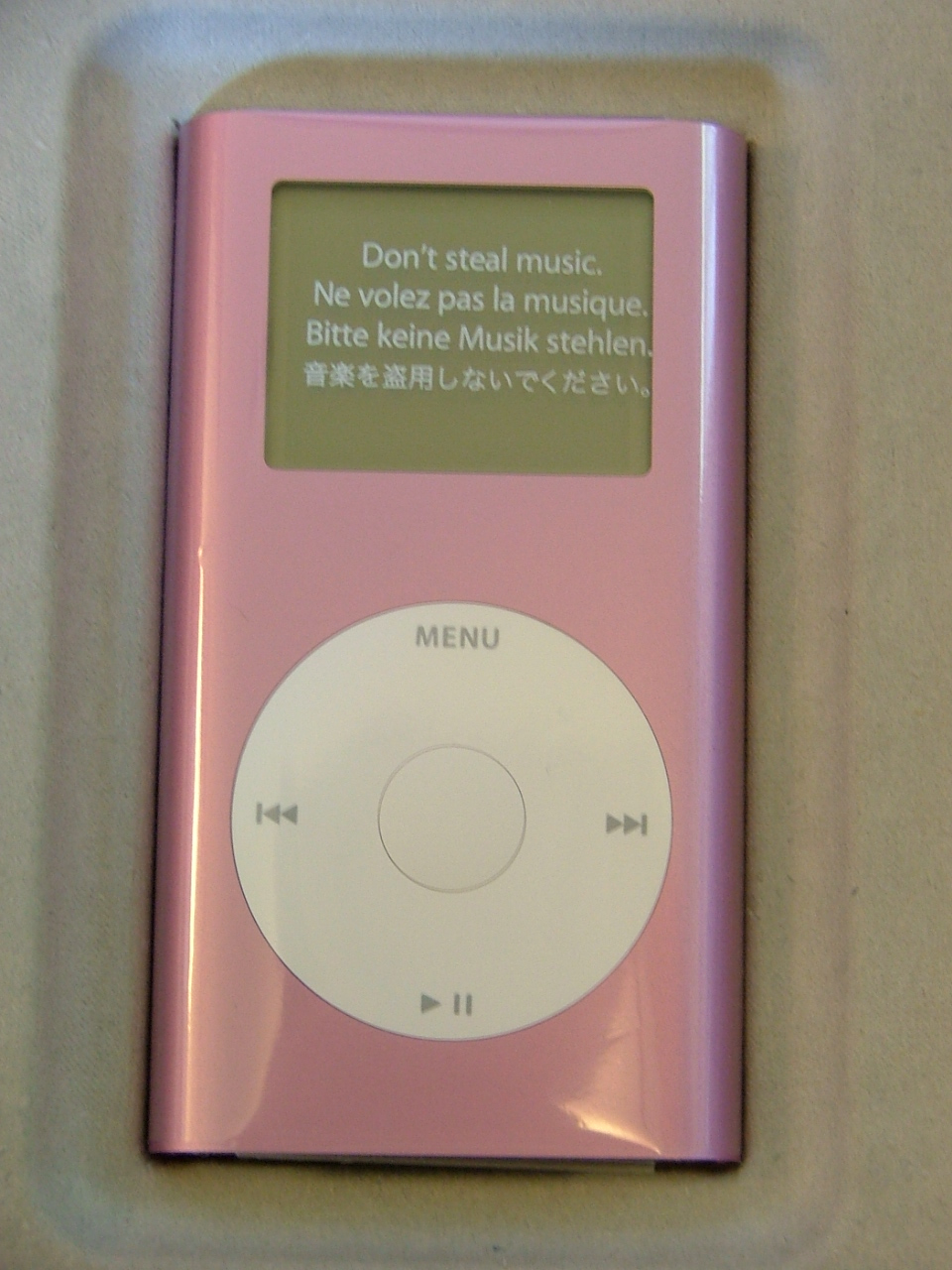
Pink colored iPod Mini

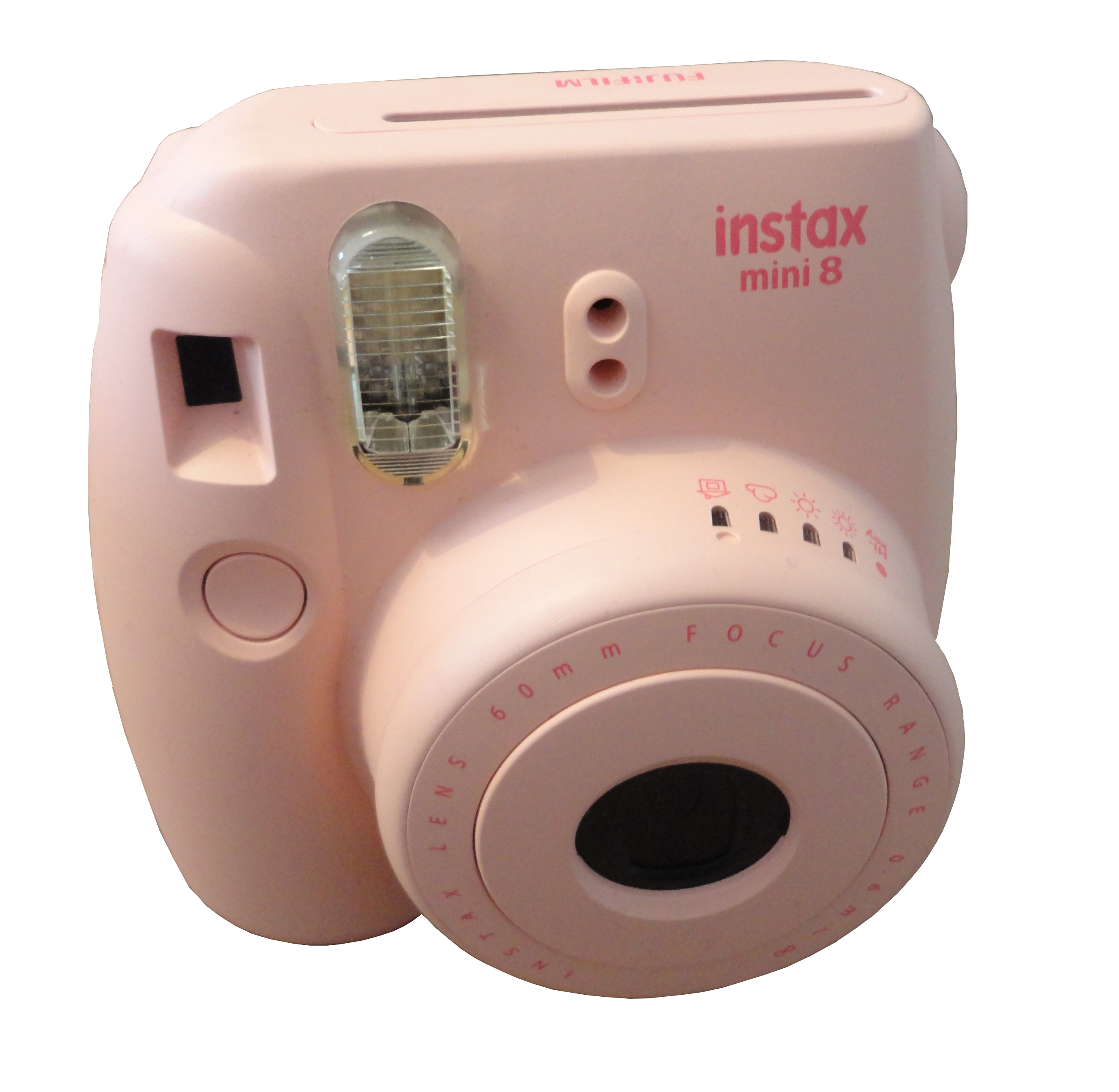
Pink colored Instax Mini 8 camera

=== Academic dress ===
- In the French academic dress system, the five traditional fields of study (Arts, Science, Medicine, Law and Divinity) are each symbolized by a distinctive color, which appears in the academic dress of the people who graduated in this field. Redcurrant, an extremely red shade of pink, is the distinctive color for Medicine (and other health-related fields) Groseille (couleur).

=== Heraldry ===
The word pink is not used for any tincture (color) in heraldry, but there are two fairly uncommon tinctures which are both close to pink:

- The heraldic color of rose is a modern innovation, mostly used in Canadian heraldry, depicting a reddish pink color like the shade usually called rose.
- In French heraldry, the color carnation is sometimes used, corresponding to the skin color of a light skinned Caucasian human. This can also be seen as a pink shade but is usually depicted slightly more brownish beige than the rose tincture.

=== Calendars ===
- In Thailand, pink is associated with Tuesday on the Thai solar calendar. Anyone may wear pink on Tuesdays, and anyone born on a Tuesday may adopt pink as their color.

=== The press ===
Pink is used for the newsprint paper of several important newspapers devoted to business and sports, and the color is also connected with the press aimed at the LGBTQIA community.

Since 1893 the London Financial Times newspaper has used a distinctive salmon pink color for its newsprint, originally because pink dyed paper was less expensive than bleached white paper. Today the color is used to distinguish the newspaper from competitors on a press kiosk or news stand. In some countries, the salmon press identifies economic newspapers or economics sections in "white" newspapers. Some sports newspapers, such as La Gazzetta dello Sport in Italy, also use pink paper to stand out from other newspapers. It awards a pink jersey to the winner of Italy's most important bicycle race, the Giro d'Italia. (See #Sports).

=== Law ===
- In England and Wales, a brief delivered to a barrister by a solicitor is usually tied with pink ribbon. Pink was traditionally the color associated with the defense, while white ribbons may have been used for the prosecution.

=== Religion ===
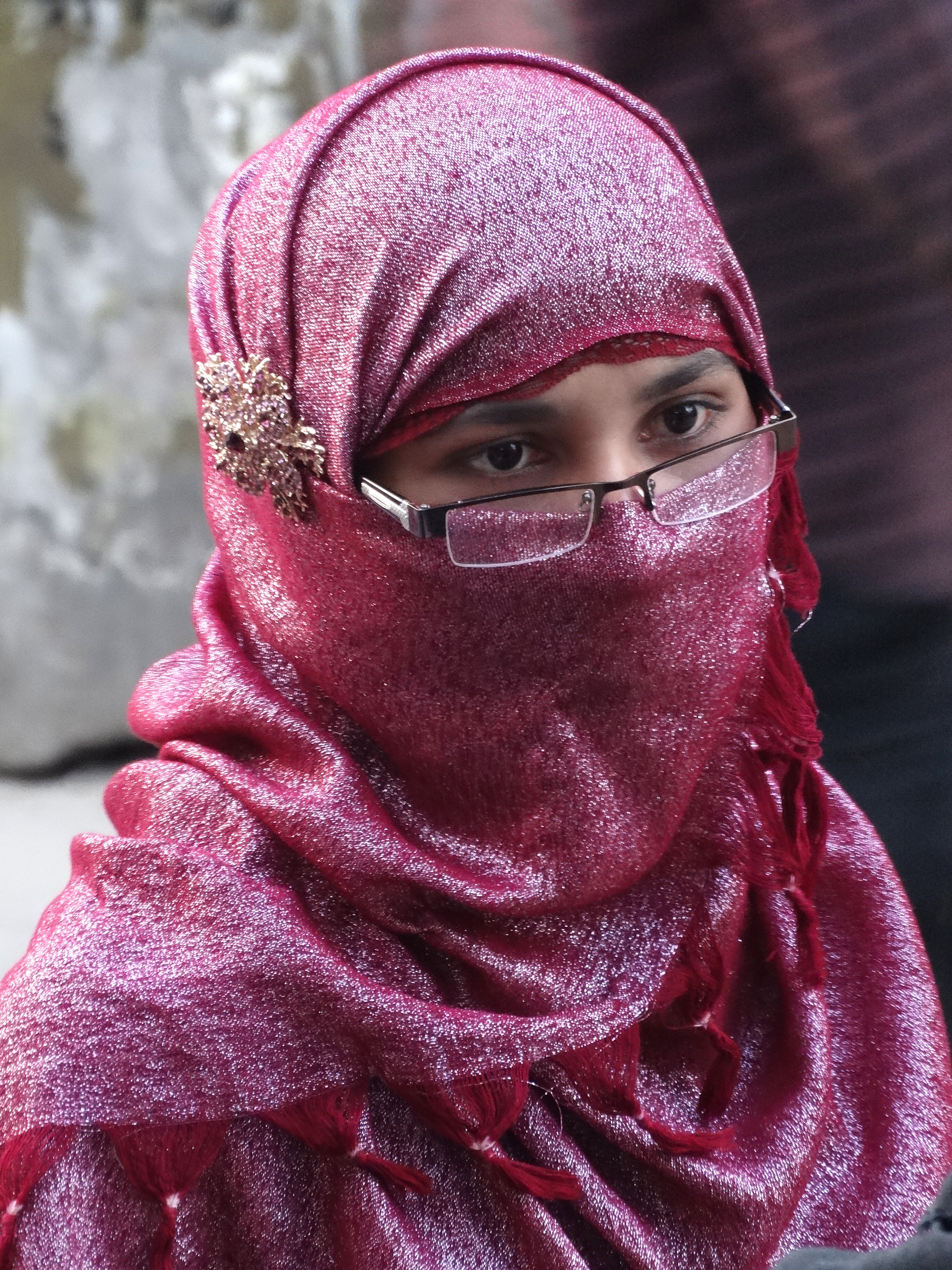
A Bengali Muslim woman wearing a pink niqab

- In the Yogic Hindu, Shaktic Hindu and Tantric Buddhist traditions rose is one of the colors of the fourth primary energy center, the heart chakra Anahata. The other color is green.
- In Catholicism, pink (called rose by the Catholic Church) symbolizes joy and happiness. It is used for the Third Sunday of Advent (Gaudete Sunday) and the Fourth Sunday of Lent (Laetare Sunday) to mark the halfway point in these seasons of penance. For this reason, one of the candles in an Advent wreath may be pink, rather than purple.
- Pink is the color most associated with Indian spiritual leader Meher Baba, who often wore pink coats to please his closest female follower, Mehera Irani, and today pink remains an important color, symbolizing love, to Baba's followers.
- Some Wiccans believe that it represents affection, friendship, companionship, and spiritual healing. It is often used for love spells.

=== Sports ===
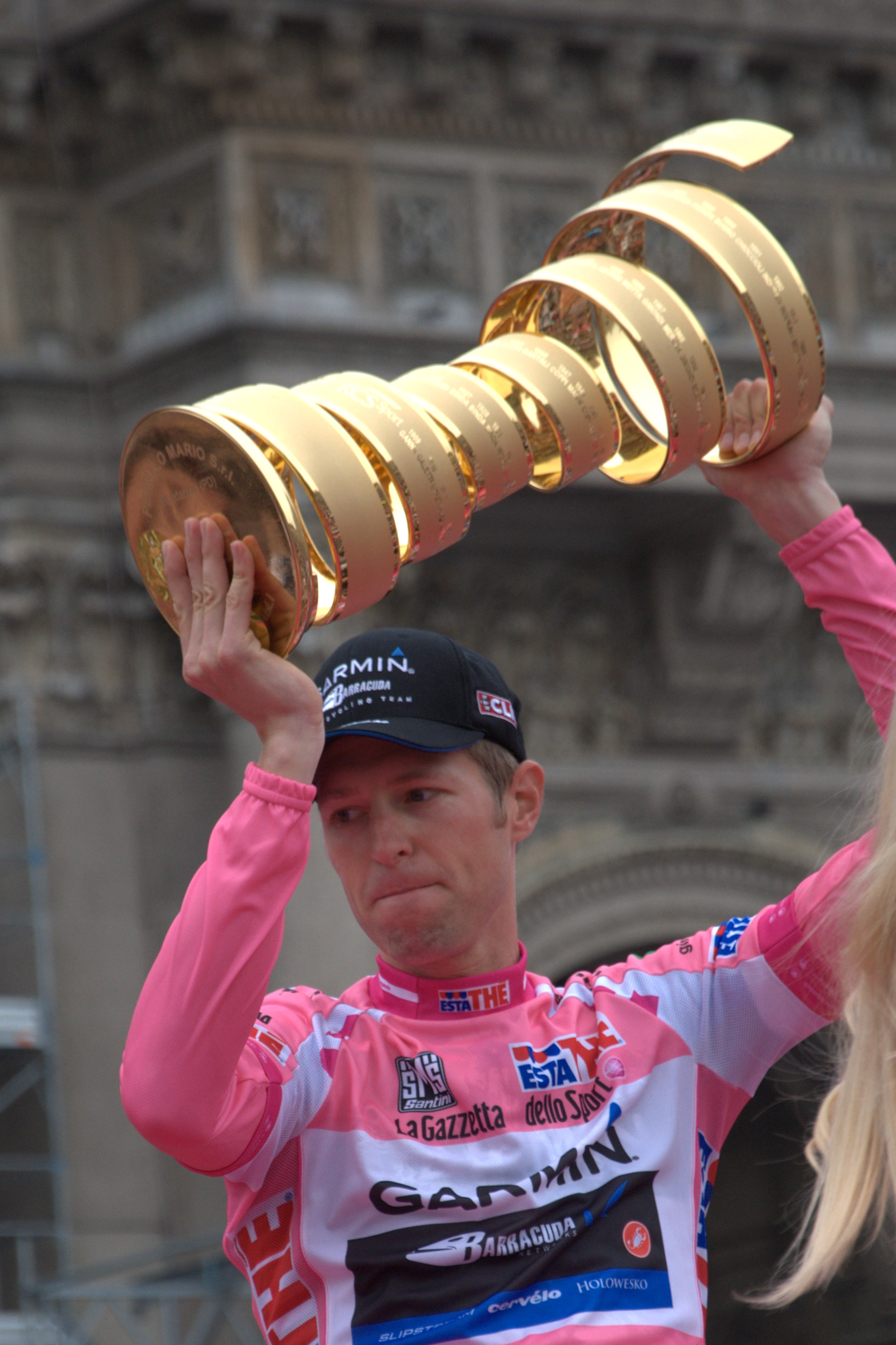
The leader in the Giro d'Italia cycle race wears a pink jersey (maglia rosa)

- Palermo, a soccer team based in Palermo, Italy, traditionally wears pink home jerseys.
- Cerezo Osaka, a soccer team based in Osaka, Japan, typically wears pink home shirts. Cerezo is the Spanish translation for cherry tree, which are known for its pink blossoms.
- Inter Miami, a soccer team based in South Florida, United States, currently features pink home shirts. The club wore white home shirts in its first two seasons in existence.
- In Major League Baseball, pink bats are used by baseball players on Mother's Day as part of a week-long program to benefit Susan G. Komen for the Cure.
- Pink can mean the scarlet coat worn in fox hunting (a.k.a. "riding to hounds"). One legend about the origin of this meaning refers to a tailor named Pink (or Pinke, or Pinque).
- The leader in the Giro d'Italia cycle race wears a pink jersey (maglia rosa); this reflects the distinctive pink-colored newsprint of the sponsoring Italian La Gazzetta dello Sport newspaper.
- The University of Iowa's Kinnick Stadium visitors' locker room is painted pink. The decor has sparked controversy, perceived by some people as suggesting sexism and homophobia.
- WWE Hall of Famer Bret Hart, as well as other members of the Hart wrestling family, is known for his pink and black wrestling attire.
- The Western Hockey League team Calgary Hitmen originally wore pink as a tribute to the aforementioned Bret Hart, who was a part team owner at the time.
- Snooker uses a pink-colored object ball that is worth 6pts when legally potted.
- Formula One constructors Force India and Racing Point used pink as the primary color on their cars during the 2017–2020 seasons. At the 2017 United States Grand Prix, the purple side-wall branding on the ultra-soft compound tire was replaced by pink for the race to raise awareness of Breast Cancer Awareness Month. Several teams also incorporated pink into their liveries to support the cause (except Force India, whose cars were pink to begin with).
- To distinguish tuned performance models from ordinary ones, Subaru uses a badge with a pink background on their cars. Also the logo of their motorsports arm Subaru Tecnica International is colored pink.
- The NFL among other sports have incorporated pink into their promotions, team uniforms and equipment during the month of October in support of Breast Cancer Awareness Month.

=== Music ===
- The names of the music artists Pink, Momoiro Clover Z and Blackpink use the color as an influence.

== See also ==
- Fuchsia (color)
- Lists of colors
- Rosé, a wine whose color is between red and white
- Shades of pink
