= William Nassau de Zuylestein =

William Nassau de Zuylestein may refer to:

- William Nassau de Zuylestein, 1st Earl of Rochford (1649–1708)
- William Nassau de Zuylestein, 2nd Earl of Rochford
- William Nassau de Zuylestein, 4th Earl of Rochford
- William Nassau de Zuylestein, 5th Earl of Rochford
