= Easton Park (Suffolk estate) =

Former seat of the Earl of Rochfors and Dukes of Hamilton

Coordinates: 52.1799°N 1.3366°E

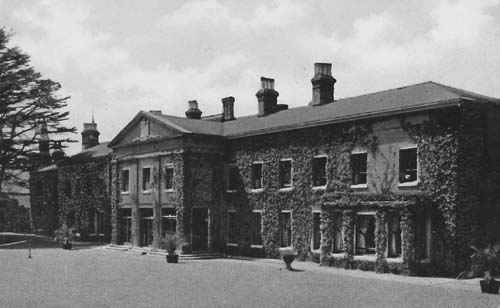
Easton Park (1909)

Easton Park was a stately home in Easton, Suffolk, England. It served as the seat of prominent families, including the Wingfields, the Earls of Rochford, and the Dukes of Hamilton, whose political, diplomatic, and military careers placed the estate within the wider context of British national history. The mansion, repeatedly enlarged and remodelled between the 17th and 19th centuries, was demolished in 1924 following the breakup of the estate after the First World War.

== History ==
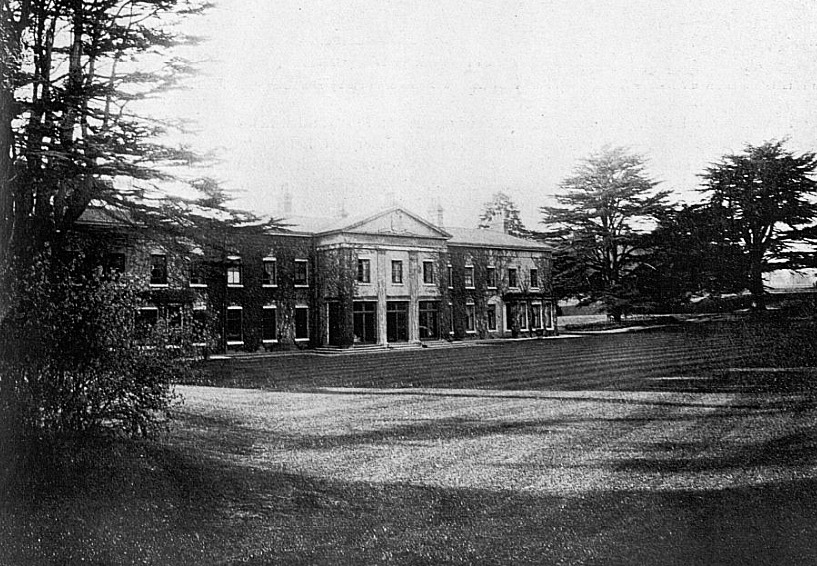
Easton Park - East side

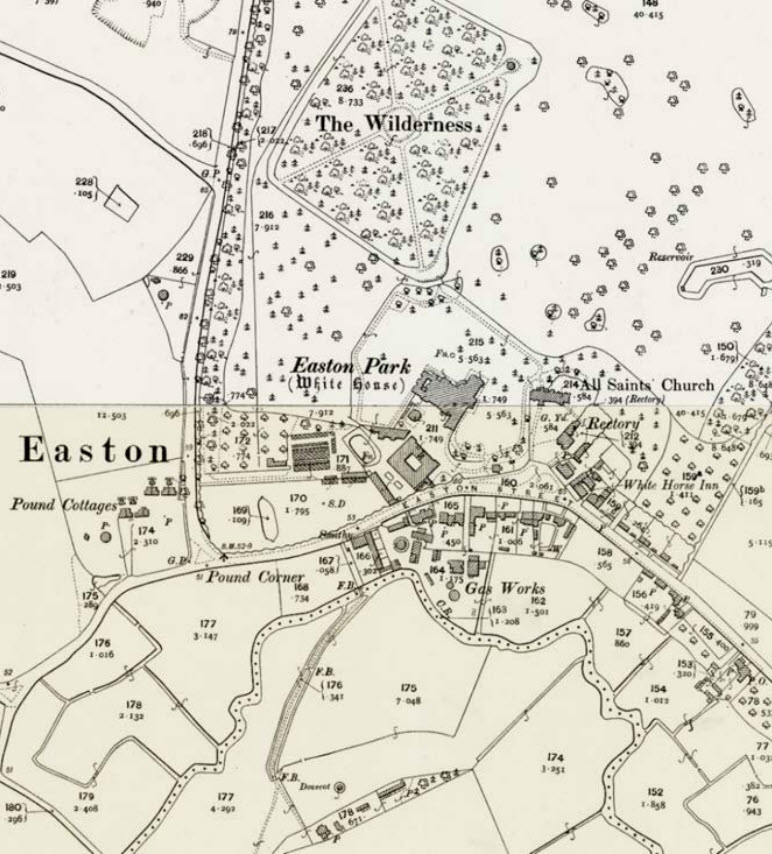
Map showing the location of Easton Park within Easton (1903)

=== Early history and the Wingfield family ===
The earliest association between Easton and a major landowning family is with the Wingfields of Letheringham, who held positions in royal service from the fourteenth century onward. In 1627, Sir Anthony Wingfield established the family’s principal residence at Easton, relocating a Palladian-style mansion from Ipswich and re-erecting it within approximately 150 acres of landscaped parkland. The Wingfields continued to manage the estate while serving in various public offices, but the family fortunes declined in the late seventeenth century. Upon returning from diplomatic service in Flanders, Sir Henry Wingfield discovered extensive financial mismanagement on the estate and, facing insolvency, offered Easton for sale in 1695.

=== The Nassau de Zuylestein family: Earls of Rochford (1708–1830) ===
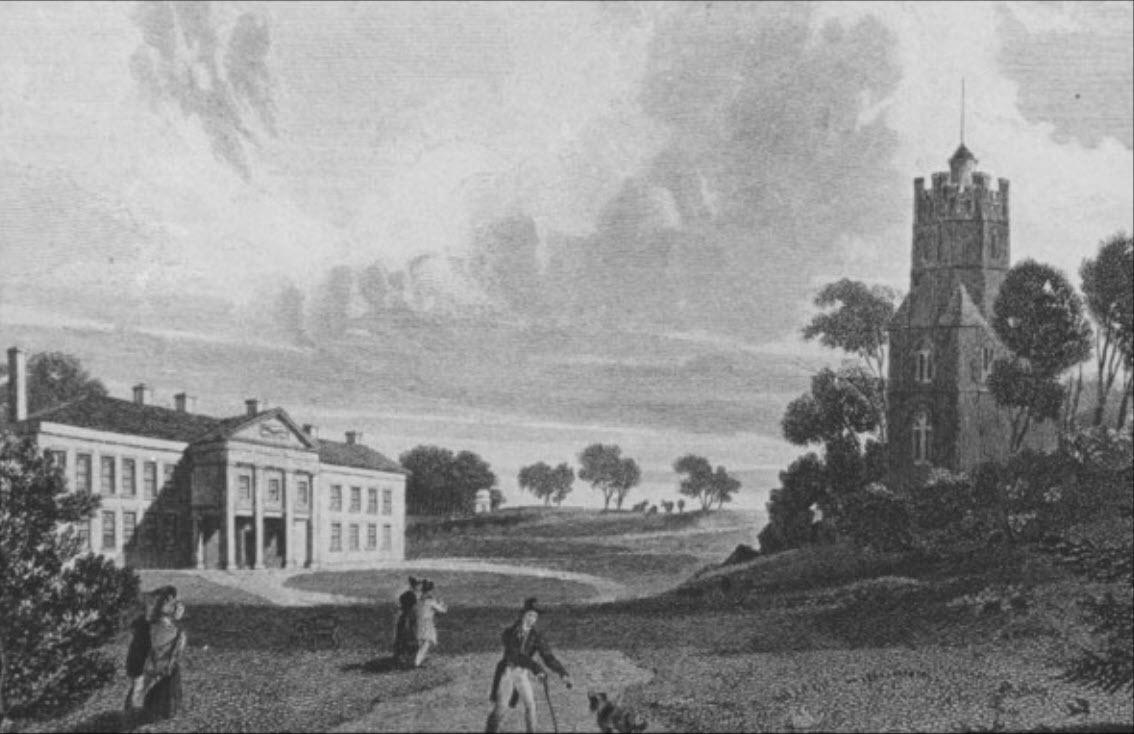
Easton Park (1780)

The estate remained unsold until 1708, when it was purchased by William Henry Nassau de Zuylestein, a Dutch officer and diplomat born at Zuylestein Castle (Zuylenstein), the ancestral seat inherited from his father in the province of Utrecht. A half-cousin of William III and one of his most trusted envoys, Zuylestein played an important role in William’s contacts with English allies during the approach to the Glorious Revolution and served with distinction in the Dutch and English armies. In recognition of these services, traditionally said to include saving the King’s life, he was created the 1st Earl of Rochford in 1695. He died in 1708, the same year he acquired Easton, after which the estate descended through the subsequent Earls of Rochford.

The 2nd Earl was killed in the battle of Almenara against the Spanish in 1710. The title then passed to his brother Frederick, the 3rd Earl, and subsequently to Frederick’s son William Henry, the 4th Earl of Rochford. The latter pursued a distinguished diplomatic career, serving as ambassador to Spain and France and as envoy to the Kingdom of Sardinia. As a member of Parliament, he cast a decisive vote to retain taxation on the American colonies, a decision later seen as contributing to the conditions leading to the American War of Independence.

As the 4th Earl favoured St Osyth's Priory as his principal country seat, he sold the Easton estate in 1760 to his younger brother Richard, who was married to Anne Spencer, the widow of the 5th Duke of Hamilton. Their son William Henry later became the 5th Earl of Rochford. The 5th Earl undertook improvements to the house and oversaw the construction of the serpentine or “crinkle-crankle” wall that enclosed the 150-acre park. With his death in 1830, unmarried and without heirs, the Rochford line in Easton came to an end. The Dutch estates including Zuylestein castle were inherited by the Earl of Athlone, while Easton Park was inherited by the Dukes of Hamilton.

=== Acquisition by the Dukes of Hamilton ===
Easton Park next entered the possession of the Hamilton family, one of Scotland’s foremost aristocratic houses. Alexander Hamilton, 10th Duke of Hamilton, a diplomat, art collector and former ambassador to Russia, acquired the estate through inheritance. For Alexander and his wife, Susan Hamilton, Duchess of Hamilton, daughter of William Beckford (builder of Fonthill Abbey), the modest Easton mansion was secondary to their principal residence, Hamilton Palace in Lanarkshire, one of the largest private houses in Britain at the time. Nonetheless, they initiated improvements in the village, including the construction of Easton’s first school in 1852.

After Alexander’s death in 1852, the estate passed to his son William Hamilton, 11th Duke of Hamilton, who took limited interest in his English and Scottish affairs. On his death in 1863, the titles and properties, including Easton, were inherited by his son William Douglas-Hamilton, 12th Duke of Hamilton.

=== Expansion and transformation under the 12th Duke ===
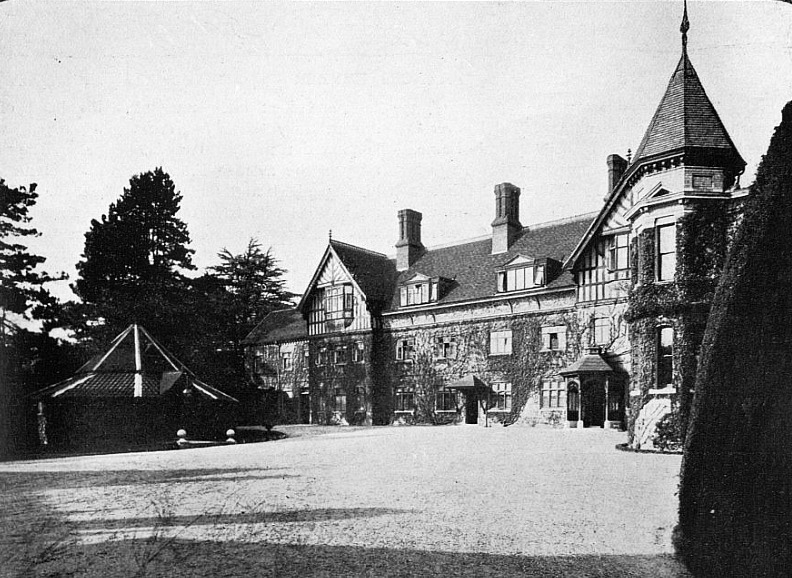
Easton Park - South side

The 12th Duke of Hamilton profoundly reshaped Easton Park during the 1870s and 1880s. Known for his interest in sport, horse racing, sailing, and a notably extravagant lifestyle, the Duke undertook extensive building works. In 1874 he commissioned a new Tudor Revival mansion while retaining elements of the earlier Wingfield house behind it. The new complex included large stables accommodating up to fifty horses and additional housing for estate workers. Also, gas lighting was fitted throughout the house. At its height, the estate expanded to nearly 5,000 acres, supporting hunting with the Easton Harriers, shooting parties, and large-scale agricultural operations.

Between 1868 and 1882, the Duke ordered three steam yachts, the most famous being the Thistle, which frequently berthed at Ipswich and conveyed him to racecourses across Europe. His heavy expenditure, combined with significant gambling losses, required the sale in 1882 of the Hamilton family’s renowned art collection housed in Hamilton Palace. The sale, conducted over seventeen days, was described at the time as the sale of the century.

Despite these financial pressures, further alterations to the Easton mansion continued. Between 1892 and 1893 the house was expanded with a third storey, creating a residence of 27 bedrooms. Additional improvements to the local church, village infrastructure, and a new school (opened in 1892) were also funded.

The Duke died in 1895 aboard his yacht in Algeria. Although he possessed extensive lands, amounting to 157,386 acres, his debts remained substantial.

=== Final years (1895–1924) ===
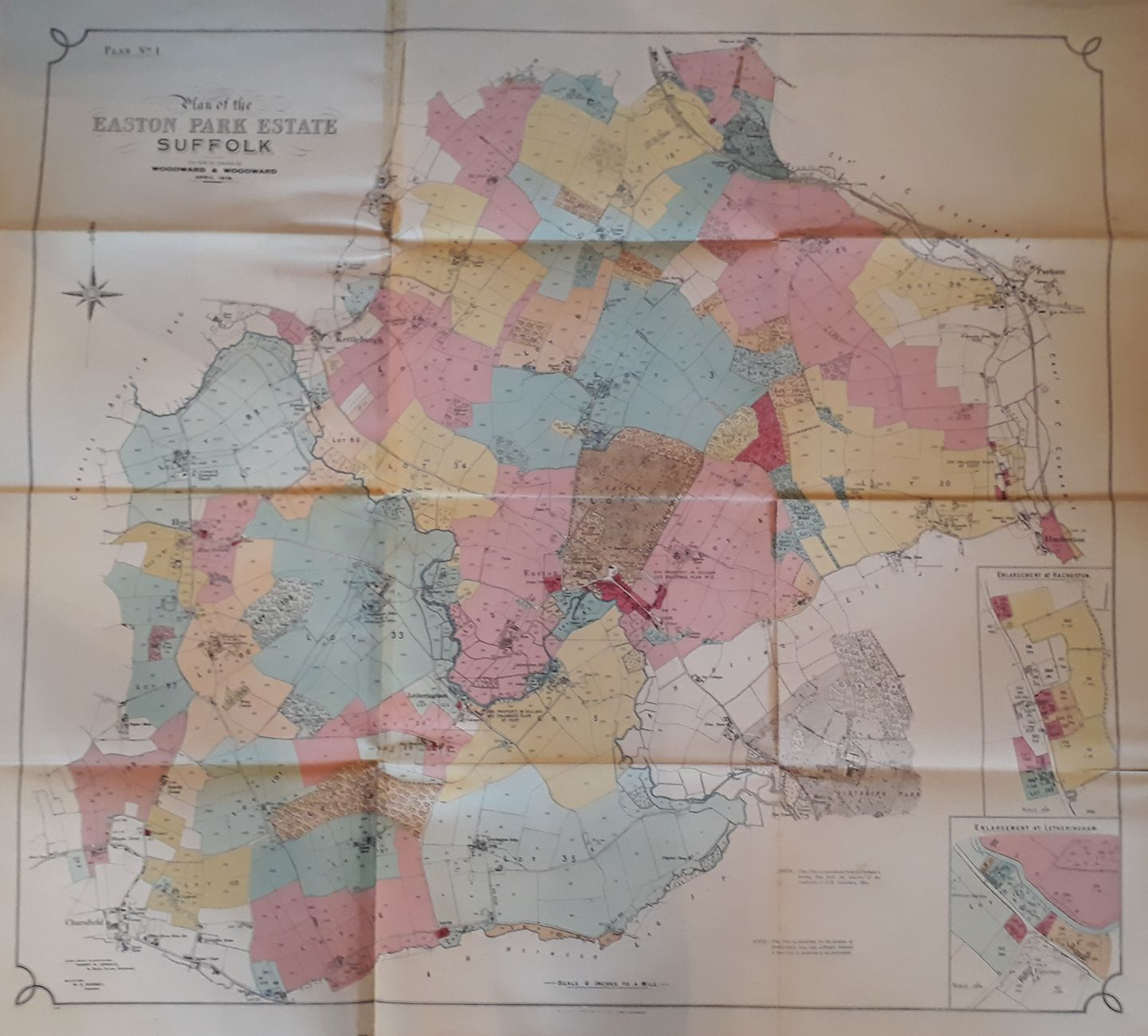
Map of the Easton Park estate at the time of being sold (1919)

With no male heir, the Hamilton titles passed to a distant relative, but the Easton estate together with the estates on the Isle of Arran was inherited by the Duke’s daughter, Lady Mary Hamilton, who married James Graham, 6th Duke of Montrose and became Duchess of Montrose. Before the First World War, the family increasingly resided in Scotland, Brodick Castle, leaving Easton in the care of estate agents and her mother, the Dowager Duchess.

During the First World War, the mansion was converted into a fourteen bed Red Cross hospital for wounded soldiers and sailors. The Dowager Duchess acted as Commandant, and contemporary accounts praised the work carried out at Easton during this period.

Following the war, newly imposed taxes on large landowners made the maintenance of the estate financially unsustainable. In 1919, Easton Park was divided into 137 lots and sold at public auction. Although most lots were purchased, the mansion and the core 150-acre park failed to attract a buyer. A second auction in 1922 was also unsuccessful. The house was eventually sold privately in 1922 for a fraction of its earlier valuation.

Separated from most of its surrounding land, the mansion was no longer viable as a country house. It was demolished in December 1924, with architectural elements salvaged and reused in nearby buildings. The parkland was absorbed into the neighbouring Martley Hall estate.

=== Aftermath and legacy ===
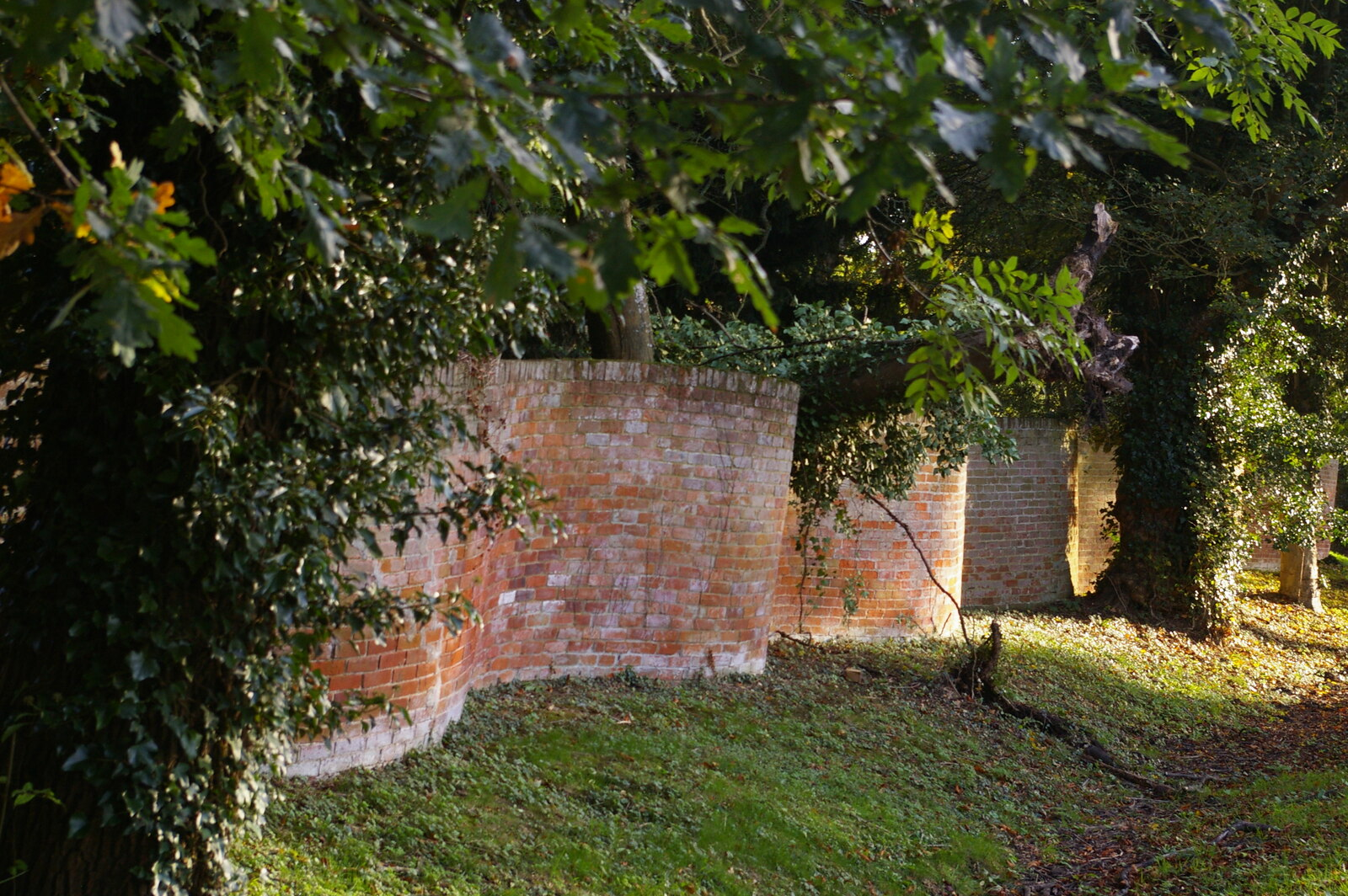
The crinkle-crankle wall still remains

Today, Easton Park survives primarily in documentary records, surviving estate buildings, the remnants of the crinkle-crankle wall, and local memory.

== Literature ==
- Farley, Peter (2008). The Hamiltons of Easton. privately published. pp. 1–39.
- Easton Conservation Area Appraisal (PDF). East Suffolk Council. 2014.
