= Robert Fagge =

Robert Fagge or Fagg may refer to:

- Sir Robert Fagge, 2nd Baronet (c. 1649–1715)
- Sir Robert Fagge, 3rd Baronet (1673–1736)
- Sir Robert Fagg, 4th Baronet (1704–1740), British politician
