= Frederick Nassau de Zuylestein =

- Frederik van Nassau-Zuylestein
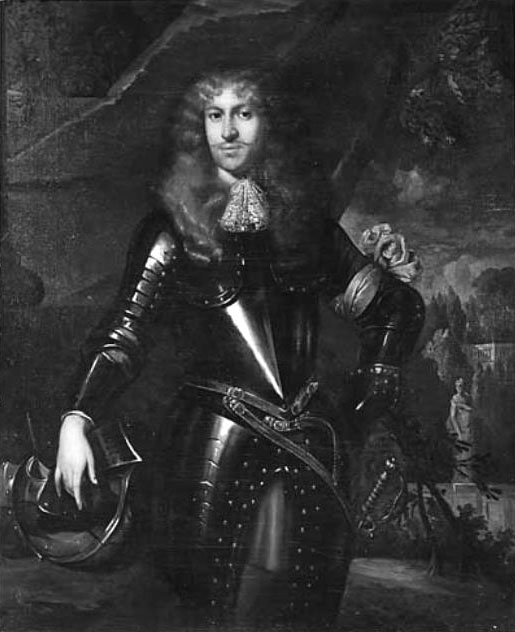
- Portrait by Sir Peter Lely

Personal details
- Born: 1624
- Died: 12 October 1672 (aged 47–48) Woerden, Dutch Republic
- Spouse: Mary Killegrew
- Children: William Nassau de Zuylestein, 1st Earl of Rochford Hendrik van Nassau-Zuylestein

Frederick of Nassau, Lord of Zuylestein (1624–1672) was an illegitimate son of Frederick Henry, Prince of Orange, by Margaretha Catharina Bruyns,

== Life ==
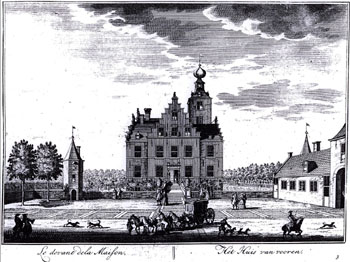
Castle Zuylestein in 1650, later destroyed by bomb attack during World War II.

Frederick was born in 1624 out of wedlock to Frederick Henry, Prince of Orange (1584–1647) and Margaretha Catharina Bruyns (1595–1625), who was the daughter of Ludolph Bruyns, mayor of Emmerich.

On 15 March 1640, Frederick's father gave him Castle Zuylestein (also spelled Zuylenstein) - situated about twenty miles east of the city of Utrecht, and with it he also gave him the title Lord of Zuylestein (in Dutch: Heer van Zuylestein). Furthermore, he made Frederick captain of infantry for the state.
In 1659, Frederick was made governor of the household of his nephew, William III of Orange. Through lobbying by Johan de Wit, William III became the state's ward in 1666, and Frederick was dismissed. His dismissal was because he was married to an Englishwoman and was under suspicion of pro-English leanings. In April 1672 (the Rampjaar) he became general of the infantry and in August he became involved in the murders of Johan and Cornelis de Wit.

=== Marriage and children ===
On 16 October 1648, Frederick married Mary Killigrew (born 1627) in The Hague. She was a daughter of William Killigrew (1606–1695) (a favourite of Charles I and Charles II of England) and Mary Hill, of Honilay. She was a first cousin of Charles II's illegitimate daughter, the Countess of Yarmouth. She had moved to the Netherlands in February 1644, aged barely seventeen, as a maid of honour to Mary, Princess Royal and Princess of Orange.

Frederick and Mary had three children:

- Willem Hendrik van Nassau-Zuylestein, 1st Earl of Rochford, Heer van Zuylestein, Leersum en Waayenstein (1649 – 12 July 1708). He was born at Castle Zuylestein. He became a soldier and diplomat and was a close confidant of his cousin, William III of England, who rewarded him with the titles Earl of Rochford, Viscount Tunbridge and Baron Enfield in 1695.
- Hendrik van Nassau-Zuylestein, Heer van Leersum (ca 1650 – 13 November 1673). He died in the siege of Bonn when the troops of the Republic, under the leadership of his cousin William III, conquered Bonn, which resulted in the French supply lines to the troops in the Republic being cut off.
- Maria van Nassauw, (1656-?)

=== Death ===
In October 1672 Frederick died near Woerden in a battle with the French known as the Battle of Kruipin.

== Half-siblings ==
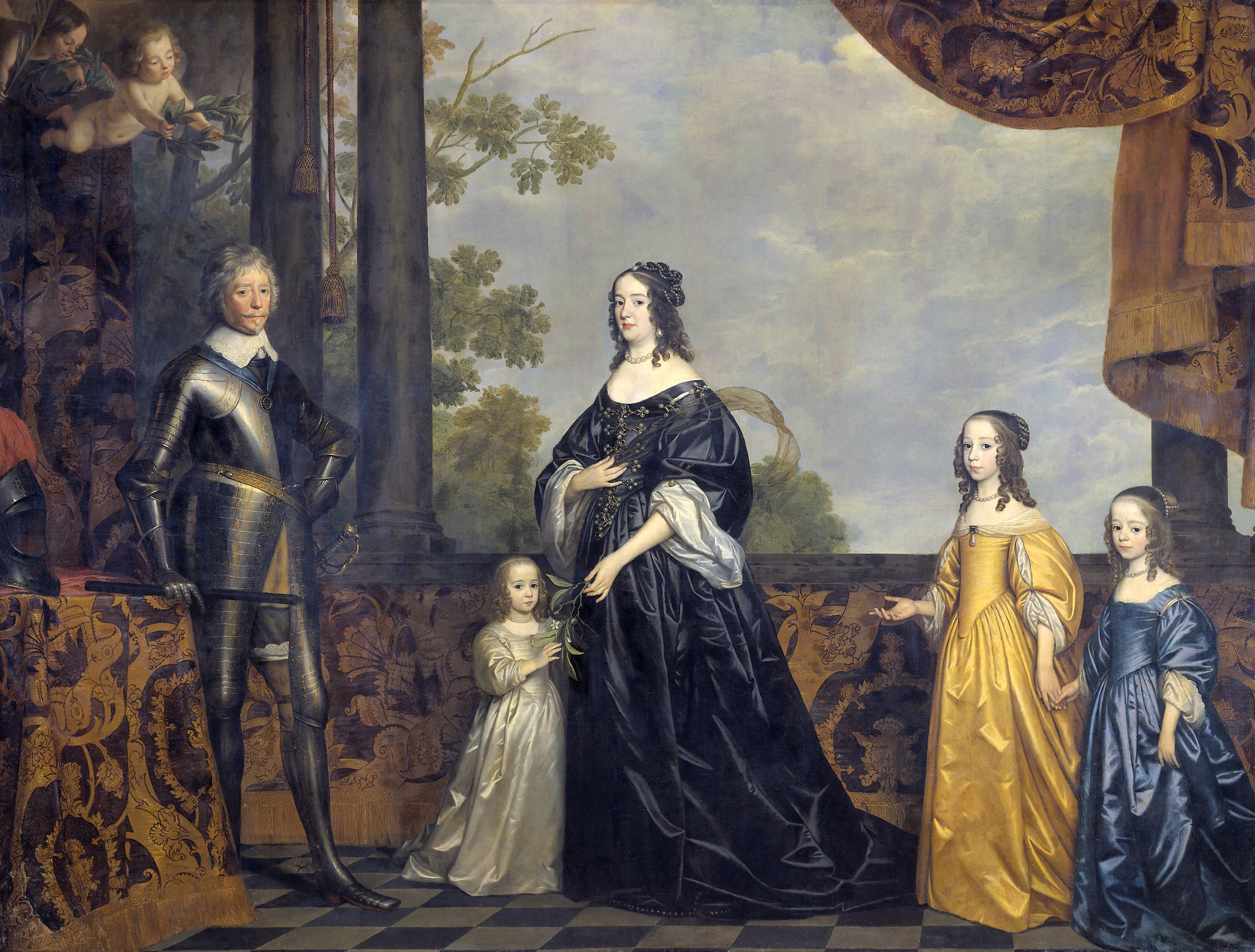
Prince Frederick Henry and his wife Amalia of Solms-Braunfels with their three youngest daughters, portrayed by Gerard van Honthorst.

Frederick was an illegitimate son of Frederick Henry, Prince of Orange, born to him before he married. Frederick had nine legitimate half-siblings with whom he shared his father. Their mother was his father's wife Amalia of Solms-Braunfels.

- William II, Prince of Orange (27 May 1626 – 6 November 1650)
- Luise Henriette of Nassau (27 December 1627 – 18 June 1667)
- Henriëtte Amalia of Nassau (26 October 1628 – December 1628)
- Elisabeth of Nassau (4 August 1630)
- Isabella Charlotte of Nassau (22 January/28 April 1632 – 17 May 1642)
- Albertine Agnes of Nassau (9 April 1634 – 24 May 1696)
- Henriette Catherine of Nassau (10 February 1637 – 3 November 1708)
- Hendrik Lodewijk of Nassau (30 November 1639 – 19 December 1639)
- Maria of Nassau (5 September 1642 – 17/20 March 1688)

== Arms ==
Frederick and his descendants used the arms below.

Arms of Nassau-Zuylestein. The 3-towers are known as "Zuylen" in Dutch.

Nassau Zuylestein Achievement

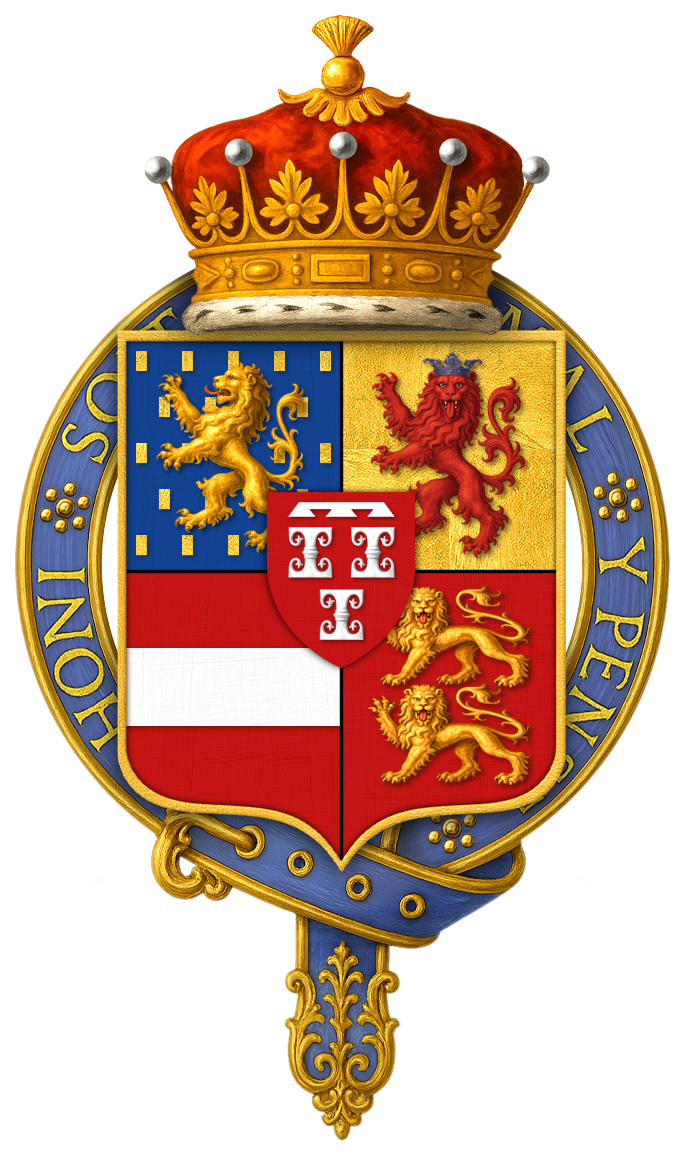
Coat of arms of William Nassau de Zuylestein, 4th Earl of Rochford, KG, PC

Nassau Zuylestein Rochford Achievement

== Descendants ==
Family tree of the House of Nassau-Zuylestein

William I "the Silent" (1533–1584); Prince of Orange 1544; Stadholder of Holland, Zealand & Utrecht
Margaretha Catharina Bruyns (1595–1625)	Frederick Henry (1584–1647); Prince of Orange, 1625, Stadtholder of Holland, Zeeland, & etc.
Mary Killigrew (1627-) daughter of Sir William Killigrew	Frederick of Nassau (1624–1672); Lord of Zuylestein
Hendrik van Nassau (c. 1650–?1673); Heer van Leersum	William van Nassau (1649–1708); Earl of Rochford
Anna Nassau de Zuylestein (c. 1681–?1701)	William Nassau de Zuylestein (1682–1710); Earl of Rochford	Frederik Nassau de Zuylestein (1684–1738) heer van Zuylestein, Leersum en Waayenstein 1709–1738, Earl of Rochford,1710	Maurits van Nassau-Zuylestein (1685–1720); Colonel, English Army	Maria van Nassau-Zuylestein (1687–1765) married baron Godard Adriaan van Reede (16xx–?1730) heer van Herreveld and Earl of Athlone, son of Godard van Reede heer van Ginckel (1644–1703)	Elizabeth van Nassau-Zuylestein (1688–?c. 1720)	Henriette (1688–1759) married Frederik Christiaan van Reede, baron van Reede, Earl of Athlone	Frederik Hendrik (Henry) van Nassau-Zuylestein (1692?–?1740)
William Nassau de Zuylestein (1717–1781); Earl of Rochford; British courtier, diplomat and statesman illeg. desc.	Richard Savage Nassau de Zuylestein (1723–1780); Member of Parliament, 1747–1754, 1774–1780
Mary (1762/3-1850)	Frederick Nassau (1771–1857); Master of St. Osyth Priory	Ann (1773/4-1848)	William Henry Nassau (1754–1830); Earl of Rochford	George Richard Savage Nassau (1758–1823) bibliophile	Lucy Nassau (1752–1830)
William Frederick Nassau (1798–1857); Master of St. Osyth Priory	Ann Nassau (1800–1868)	John Augustus Nassau (1806–?)
Elizabeth Catherina Nassau (1827–1926); Mistress of St. Osyth Priory married John Roberts Kirby	Eliza Nassau (1833–1912)	Rochford Augustus Nassau (1853–1902)
Letta Mary Nassau (1884–+young)	Frederik "Frank" Rochford Nassau (1889–1959)	Herbert Arthur Nassau (1892–1932)	Harold Charles Nassau (1894–1895)	Nellie Nassau (?-+young)	Ethel Violet Nassau (1896–?) married Frederick Savage
Doris Elsie Nassau (1915–1952) married Stanley Philip Painter	Frederik (Freddie) Herbert Nassau (1919–1990) one daughter	Herbert John Nassau (1920–1969) 2 daughters

== Literature ==
- Herbert H. Rowen, The princes of Orange: the stadholders in the Dutch Republic. Cambridge and New York: Cambridge University Press, 1988.
- Herbert H. Rowen, The princes of Orange: the stadholders in the Dutch Republic. Cambridge and New York: Cambridge University Press, 2003.
- Petrus Johannes Blok, "History of the people of the Netherlands". New York: G. P. Putnam's sons, 1898.
- Jonathan I. Israel, "The Dutch Republic: Its Rise, Greatness, and Fall, 1477–1806" Oxford University Press, 1995. ISBN 0-19-820734-4
