= George Richard Savage Nassau =

English country gentleman and bibliophile

George Richard Savage Nassau (1756–1823) was an English country gentleman, known as a bibliophile.

== Life ==
Born on 5 September 1756, he was the second son of the Hon. Richard Savage Nassau. His mother, Anne, was the only daughter and heiress of Edward Spencer of Rendlesham, Suffolk, and widow of James Hamilton, 5th Duke of Hamilton. Under the will of Sir John Barker, 7th Baronet of Grimston Hall, Trimley St. Martin, Suffolk, who died in 1766, he inherited considerable property.

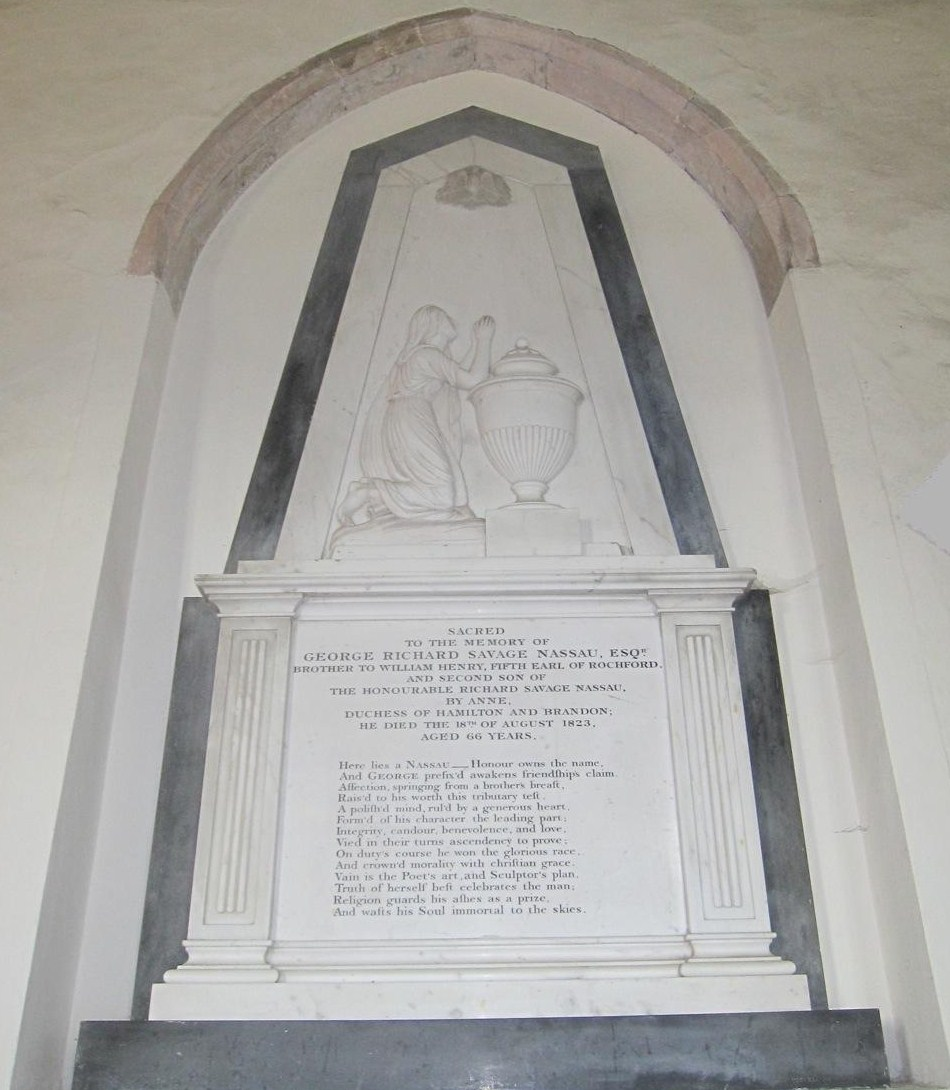
Memorial to George Richard Savage Nassau in All Saints Church, Easton

In 1805 Nassau served as high sheriff of Suffolk. He died in Charles Street, Berkeley Square, London, on 18 August 1823, after a paralytic seizure, and was buried in Easton Church, Suffolk, where a monument was erected to his memory.

== Book collector ==
Nassau formed a library, rich in emblem books, early English poetry, and drama. In topography and history his collection comprised many large-paper copies, which had drawings, prints, and portraits added, with rare historical tracts.

A particular interest was the history of Suffolk, printed and in manuscript, with portraits and engravings. Nassau employed Michael Rooker, Thomas Hearne, and William Byrne, and Suffolk artists, particularly Thomas Gainsborough, George Frost, and Isaac Johnson. When he died the 30 volumes of Suffolk manuscripts were kept at the family mansion Easton Park in Easton.

Most of Nassau's library was sold by Robert Harding Evans in 1824 in two parts, the first on 16 February and eleven following days, and the second on 8 March and seven following days. The catalogue contained 4,264 lots, and the collection realised the sum of £8,500.

== Notes ==
Attribution

This article incorporates text from a publication now in the public domain: Lee, Sidney, ed. (1894). "Nassau, George Richard Savage". Dictionary of National Biography. Vol. 40. London: Smith, Elder & Co.
