= Fagge baronets =

Title in the Baronetage of England

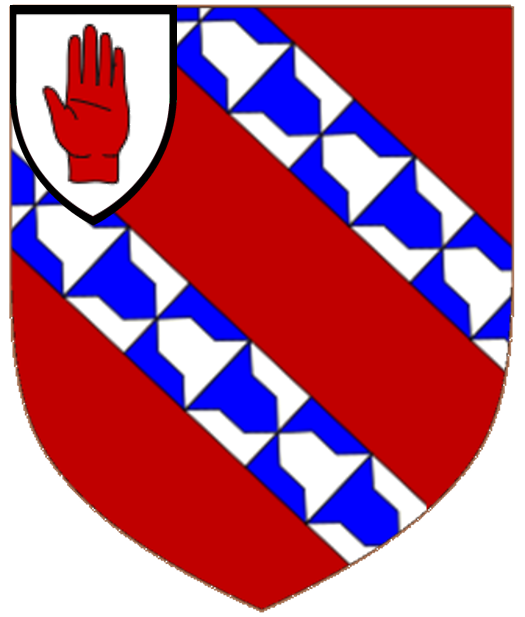
Gules, two bends vair

The Fagge Baronetcy, of Wiston in the County of Sussex, is a title in the Baronetage of England.

The baronetcy was created on 11 December 1660 for John Fagge. He fought in the Civil War as a colonel in the Parliamentary Army and represented Rye, Sussex and Steyning in the House of Commons.The second Baronet sat as Member of Parliament for Shoreham and Steyning. The third and fourth Baronet represented Steyning in Parliament. The Wiston estate was acquired by the first Baronet. On the death of the fourth Baronet in 1740 the estate passed to his sister Elizabeth, Lady Goring, wife of Sir Charles Goring, 5th Baronet (see Goring baronets).

== Fagge baronets, of Wiston (1660) ==
- Sir John Fagge, 1st Baronet (1627–1701)
- Sir Robert Fagge, 2nd Baronet (c. 1649–1715)
- Sir Robert Fagge, 3rd Baronet (1673–1736)
- Sir Robert Fagge, 4th Baronet (1704–1740)
- Sir William Fagge, 5th Baronet (c. 1726–1791)
- Sir John Fagge, 6th Baronet (c. 1760–1822)
- Sir John Fagge, 7th Baronet (1798–1873)
- Sir John William Charles Fagge, 8th Baronet (1830–1909)
- Sir John Charles Fagge, 9th Baronet (1866–1930)
- Sir John Harry Lee Fagge, 10th Baronet (1868–1940)
- Sir John William Frederick Fagge, 11th Baronet (1910–2000)
- Sir John Christopher Fagge, 12th Baronet (born 1942)

There is no heir to the title.
