= Earl of Rochford =

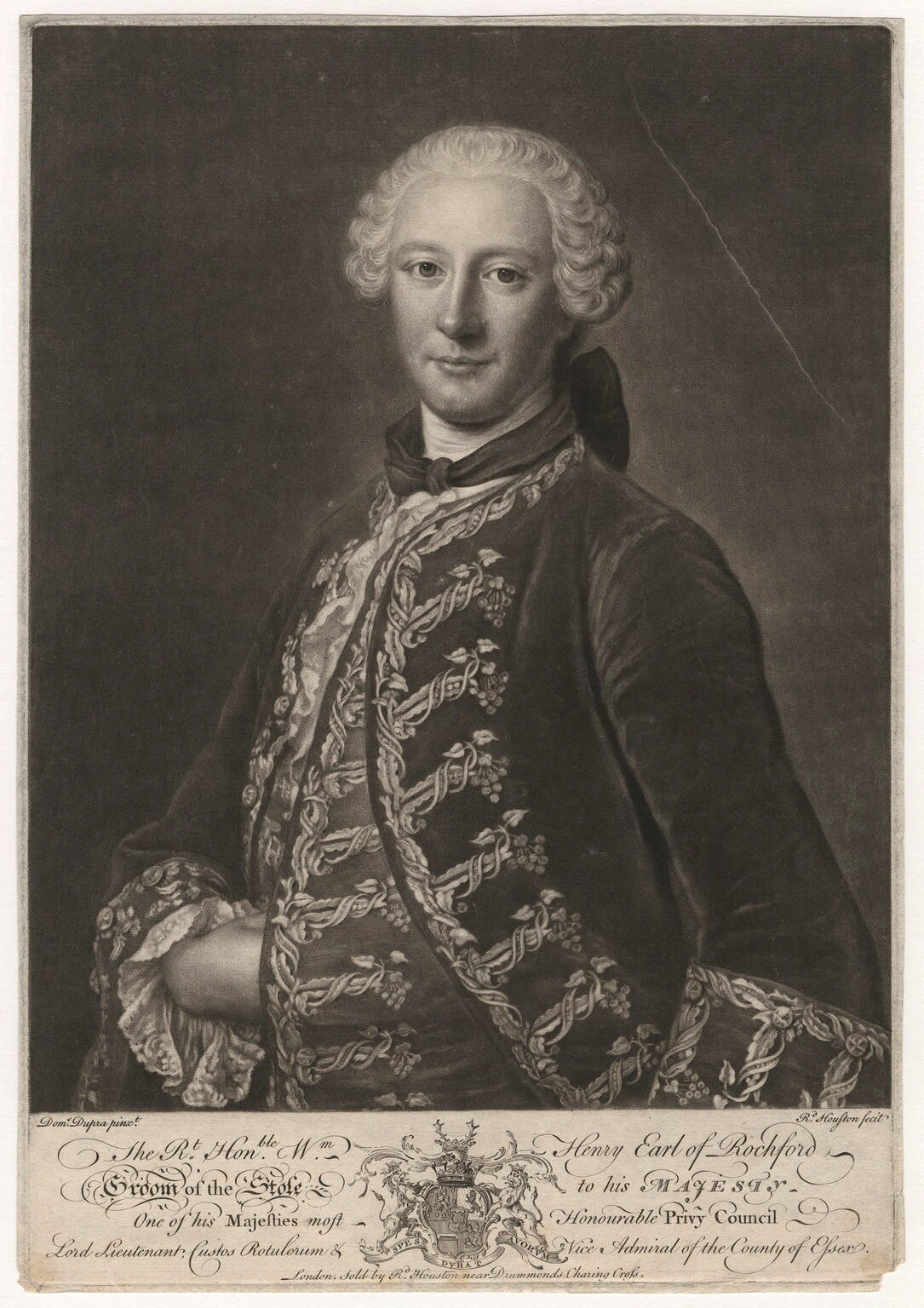
The 4th Earl of Rochford.

Earl of Rochford was a title in the Peerage of England. It was created in 1695 and became extinct in 1830.

== History ==
The title of Earl of Rochford was created in 1695 for William Nassau de Zuylestein, one of the most trusted companions of his kinsman, William of Orange. He was made Viscount Tunbridge at the same time, also in the Peerage of England. He was the son of Frederick Nassau de Zuylestein, natural son of Frederick Henry, Prince of Orange. Zuylestein was sent to England in 1687 and again in 1688 to report on the condition of affairs. In 1688 he sailed with the prince on his famous expedition. After the Revolution he was naturalized and served the king in the field, being raised to the English peerage in 1695. He was succeeded by his son William, the second Earl, who was killed at the Battle of Almenar, and then by another son, Frederick, the third Earl. Frederick's son, William Henry, the 4th Earl, was a diplomat and a statesman. Having gained experience as envoy at Turin from 1749 to 1753, he was Ambassador to Madrid from 1763 to 1766 and to Paris from 1766 to 1768. From 1768 to 1775 he was one of the secretaries of state. He left no legitimate children when he died on 28 September 1781, and was succeeded by his nephew, William Henry, the 5th Earl. The titles became extinct on the latter's death in September 1830. The estates of the Earls of Rochford were in Suffolk and Essex, their principal residence being St Osyth Priory in the latter county, and Easton Park.

== Earls of Rochford (1695) ==
- William Nassau de Zuylestein, 1st Earl of Rochford (1649–1709)
- William Nassau de Zuylestein, 2nd Earl of Rochford (1682–1710)
- Frederick Nassau de Zuylestein, 3rd Earl of Rochford (1683–1738)
- William Henry Nassau de Zuylestein, 4th Earl of Rochford (1717–1781)
- William Henry Nassau de Zuylestein, 5th Earl of Rochford (1754–1830)

== Arms ==
The earls of Rochford used the arms below, inherited via the founder of their Family Fredrick of Nassau, lord of Zuylestein, illegitimate son of Frederick Henry, Prince of Orange.

Arms of Nassau-Zuylestein. The 3 pillars are known as "Zuylen" in Dutch.

== Family Tree ==
Family tree of the House of Nassau-Zuylestein

William I "the Silent" (1533–1584); Prince of Orange 1544; Stadholder of Holland, Zealand & Utrecht
Margaretha Catharina Bruyns (1595–1625)	Frederick Henry (1584–1647); Prince of Orange, 1625, Stadtholder of Holland, Zeeland, & etc.
Mary Killigrew (1627-) daughter of Sir William Killigrew	Frederick of Nassau (1624–1672); Lord of Zuylestein
Hendrik van Nassau (c. 1650–?1673); Heer van Leersum	William van Nassau (1649–1708); Earl of Rochford
Anna Nassau de Zuylestein (c. 1681–?1701)	William Nassau de Zuylestein (1682–1710); Earl of Rochford	Frederik Nassau de Zuylestein (1684–1738) heer van Zuylestein, Leersum en Waayenstein 1709–1738, Earl of Rochford,1710	Maurits van Nassau-Zuylestein (1685–1720); Colonel, English Army	Maria van Nassau-Zuylestein (1687–1765) married baron Godard Adriaan van Reede (16xx–?1730) heer van Herreveld and Earl of Athlone, son of Godard van Reede heer van Ginckel (1644–1703)	Elizabeth van Nassau-Zuylestein (1688–?c. 1720)	Henriette (1688–1759) married Frederik Christiaan van Reede, baron van Reede, Earl of Athlone	Frederik Hendrik (Henry) van Nassau-Zuylestein (1692?–?1740)
William Nassau de Zuylestein (1717–1781); Earl of Rochford; British courtier, diplomat and statesman illeg. desc.	Richard Savage Nassau de Zuylestein (1723–1780); Member of Parliament, 1747–1754, 1774–1780
Mary (1762/3-1850)	Frederick Nassau (1771–1857); Master of St. Osyth Priory	Ann (1773/4-1848)	William Henry Nassau (1754–1830); Earl of Rochford	George Richard Savage Nassau (1758–1823) bibliophile	Lucy Nassau (1752–1830)
William Frederick Nassau (1798–1857); Master of St. Osyth Priory	Ann Nassau (1800–1868)	John Augustus Nassau (1806–?)
Elizabeth Catherina Nassau (1827–1926); Mistress of St. Osyth Priory married John Roberts Kirby	Eliza Nassau (1833–1912)	Rochford Augustus Nassau (1853–1902)
Letta Mary Nassau (1884–+young)	Frederik "Frank" Rochford Nassau (1889–1959)	Herbert Arthur Nassau (1892–1932)	Harold Charles Nassau (1894–1895)	Nellie Nassau (?-+young)	Ethel Violet Nassau (1896–?) married Frederick Savage
Doris Elsie Nassau (1915–1952) married Stanley Philip Painter	Frederik (Freddie) Herbert Nassau (1919–1990) one daughter	Herbert John Nassau (1920–1969) 2 daughters

== See also ==
- Henry FitzJames, illegitimate son of James II, created Duke of Albemarle, together with the subsidiary titles of Earl of Rochford and Baron Romney, by his father on 13 January 1696.
