= John Cheale =

English politician

John Cheale (died 28 August 1685) was an English politician who sat in the House of Commons from 1679 to 1681.

Cheale was of a West Sussex yeoman family from Perching in Edburton. In 1650 he purchased the manor of Findon, West Sussex from John Tufton Earl of Thanet.

Cheale was elected Member of Parliament (MP) for New Shoreham in 1679 and held the seat until 1681.

Cheale's grandson, another John Cheale was Norroy King of Arms.

Parliament of England
Preceded by Henry Goring; Anthony Dean	Member of Parliament for New Shoreham; 1679–1681; With: Sir Robert Fagge, Bt; John Hales	Succeeded by John Hales; Sir Robert Fagge, Bt
