= John Bowyer (MP for Steyning) =

English politician (bef. 1504 – bef. 1555)

John Bowyer (before 1504-before 1555) was an English landowner, administrator, and politician who was MP in the Parliament of England for the constituency of Steyning in 1542.
