= Sir Robert Fagg, 4th Baronet =

British Member of Parliament (1704–1740)

Sir Robert Fagg (or Fagge), 4th Baronet (1704–1740), of Wiston, near Steyning, Sussex, was a British politician who sat in the House of Commons from 1734 to 1740.

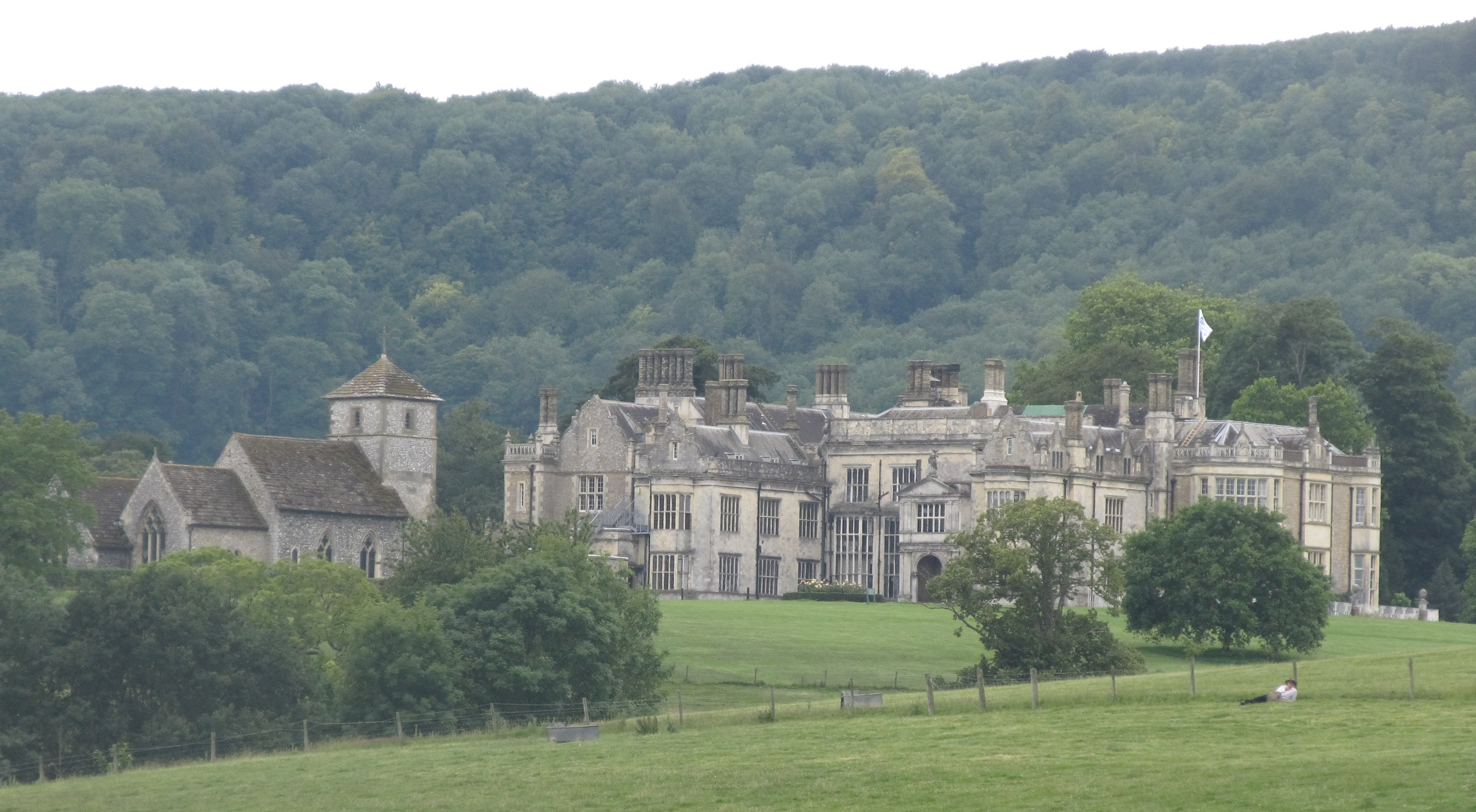
Wiston House with the church of St Mary

Fagg was baptized on 20 September 1704, the third but only surviving son of Sir Robert Fagg, 3rd Baronet, of Wiston and his wife Christian Bishopp, daughter of Sir Cecil Bishopp, 4th Baronet, MP of Parham, Sussex. He married Sarah Ward, daughter of William Ward, MD of York in 1729.

At the 1734 British general election, Fagg stood for Steyning, where his father had twice been unsuccessful. He ran with the Marquess of Carnarvon, whose father, the 1st Duke of Chandos, favoured the arrangement and they were both returned as MPs. Fagg voted with the Opposition against the Spanish convention in 1739, and for the place bill in 1740.

Fagg succeeded his father in the baronetcy on 22 June 1736. He died without issue on 14 September 1740, and was succeeded in the baronetcy by his cousin William. He left the family estates to his sister Elizabeth, who afterwards married Sir Charles Goring, 5th Baronet, son of Sir Henry Goring.

Parliament of Great Britain
Preceded by The Viscount Vane; Thomas Bladen	Member of Parliament for Steyning; 1734–1740; With: Marquess of Carnarvon	Succeeded by Hitch Younge; Marquess of Carnarvon
Baronetage of England
Preceded by Robert Fagge	Baronet (of Wiston); 1736-1740	Succeeded by William Fagge
