= Stephen Sayre =

American revolutionary (1736–1818)

Stephen Sayre (1736–1818) was a member of a thousand-strong American community living in London at the time of the outbreak of the War of Independence in 1775. A close associate of John Wilkes, the radical Lord Mayor of London, Sayre, a merchant and a city sheriff, is alleged to have planned to kidnap George III with the help of the London mob. The King was to be taken to the Tower of London, before being bundled off to his ancient patrimony in Hanover.

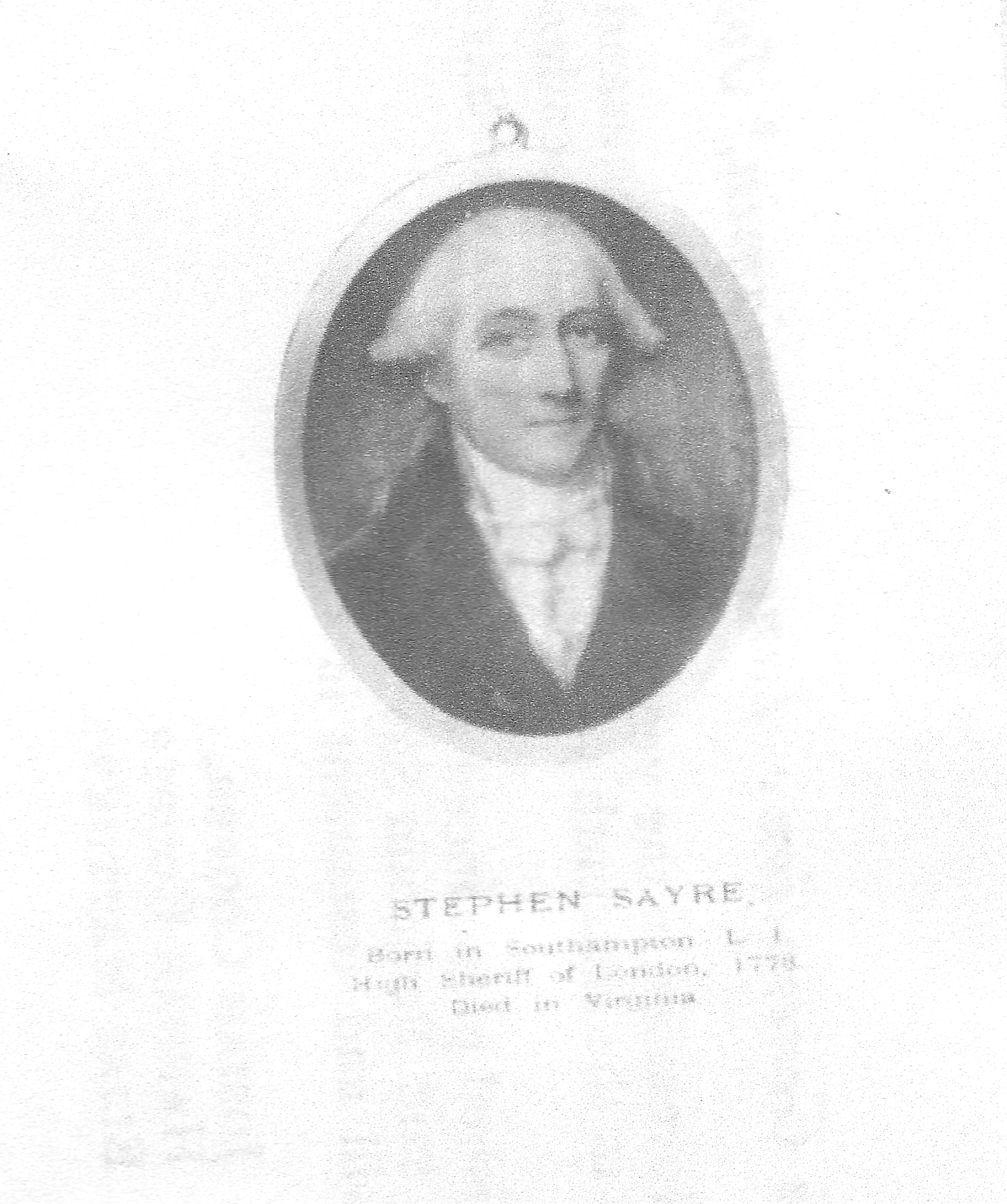
Stephen Sayre, Sheriff of the City of London 1773

Details of this improbable scheme were revealed to the British government in October 1775 by Lord Rochford, the minister responsible for domestic security. It was a time of acute political tension, and the authorities were already alert to the possibility of some form of subversive action. In the Proclamation of Rebellion, issued in the autumn, the population was asked to be aware of "diverse wicked and desperate Persons", and asked to inform the authorities of any "traitorous Conspiracies and Attempts against Us, Our Crown and Dignity."

== Planning treason ==
That same month Sayre had a meeting in a London coffeehouse with Lieutenant Francis Richardson, a fellow American who also happened to be serving in the British Army as an adjutant in the Tower. Sayre, needing Richardson's support, told him that plans had been laid to intercept George on his way to the State Opening of Parliament on 26 October. The intention was to hold him prisoner in the Tower, while the mob armed themselves with the weapons from the arsenal. Lord Mayor Wilkes, according to Sayre, approved of the scheme, and a proclamation would be issued in the name of the conspirators annulling the authority of all those in civil or military office of whom they disapproved. Richardson was asked to bribe the Tower guards not to resist, and to ensure that the gates were open on the day in question. To secure his co-operation, Sayre appealed to him as an American patriot and a true Briton, because a change of political direction was necessary to avoid the ruin of both countries.

== Sayre's arrest ==
Unfortunately for Sayre, Richardson's loyalty to the crown outweighed any sympathy he may have had for the Colonial struggle. Mindful of the Proclamation of Rebellion, he immediately reported the matter to his commanding officer, who took him to Rochford. With the opening of Parliament fast approaching, Rochford decided to act, though he was initially concerned that the evidence was not strong enough. On Monday, 23 October, Sayre was arrested on a charge of high treason. His papers were searched, and he was then taken to Rochford's office, where he denied all knowledge of the alleged plot. After this, he was committed to the Tower, while Rochford did his best to uncover some form of corroboration. By now the London press had got hold of the story, and immediately dismissed the whole thing as a political farce. Sayre had been arrested, so it was reported, "upon an Information so romantic, so foolish, so absurd, that if they thought the Accused could have done what he was charged with, he ought to have been committed to Bedlam, not the Tower."

Beyond passing unfavourable comment on the particular circumstances of the arrest, the newspapers moved on to consider the wider political implications of Rochford's precipitate action, commenting on the abuse of executive authority, and forms of arbitrary power that had turned England into France, and the Tower into the Bastille. This was, so it was said, "French Law". Despite the growing criticism, Rochford continued to hold his prisoner, though the charge was reduced from high treason to one of "treasonable practices". Two days after the opening of Parliament, with no further evidence coming forward, Sayre was finally released from the Tower, on payment of a bail of £1000, a very high figure for the day.

== Rochford's retreat ==
With Parliament opened, and the King safely back in Buckingham House, serious questions started to be asked about the exact nature of Rochford's 'emergency.' In the Cabinet he was increasingly isolated, as his fellow ministers stepped back from the whole affair in an attempt to minimise the political damage. Finally, on November 7, the hapless minister resigned for reasons of 'ill health.' Soon after Sayre was released, all charges against him having been dropped, and the bail returned. He then began his counter-attack, commencing legal action against the former minister. In the end, though the law was on his side, the action came to nothing, because the escalation of the war in North America turned Sayre from a defender of liberty, in the mould of John Wilkes, into an enemy alien.

Rochford has been blamed, both then and since, for acting in such a manner on the flimsiest of evidence. However, he had in his possession information of a sensitive nature which could not be made public, but which nevertheless gave him reason to hold Sayre in the highest suspicion. For some time before the events in question Sayre's correspondence, together with that of other suspect Americans in London, had been intercepted by the intelligence agencies of the day. Military advice was being sent to Massachusetts, and arms shipments were being arranged from Holland. Sayre and others had spoken of the need to replace George III as king. At the beginning of 1777 fresh accusations arose, this time implicating Sayre in a plot to assassinate George. In the event, the government, having been burned once, decided to take no action.

== Roving rebel ==
Sayre left England in the summer of 1777, going on to serve the United States as a diplomatic agent in various parts of Europe, from Prussia to Russia, where he tried unsuccessfully to charm the Empress Catherine. Still later he was to become an enthusiastic supporter of the French Revolution, even attempting to arrange American weapons for the French Army. He was also active in diplomatic efforts to prevent hostilities between Britain and the new French Republic, which failed when the two countries went to war in February 1793. Back in the United States he continued to argue the French case, giving him the reputation of a political extremist, which seemed to be confirmed by his hostility to the emerging Federalist Party. Disappointed in his attempts to obtain a position within the federal government, he finally retired to Virginia, where he died in 1818.

== Conspiracy or hoax? ==
A definitive conclusion to the "Sayre Plot" remains unclear. It has been suggested that the whole thing was nothing more than an elaborate hoax, intended to test the constitutionality of the emergency provisions within the newly issued Proclamation of Rebellion. There were significant sections of London opinion, including Lord Mayor Wilkes, sympathetic to the cause of the disaffected colonialists, and who may very well have wished to embarrass the government, and possibly bring a change of political direction. There was a precedent here in Wilkes' prosecution for seditious libel in 1763, over the publication of the infamous issue 45 of North Briton. Then "Wilkes and Liberty" was the war-cry of the London mob. The affair of 1775 certainly caused some temporary discomfiture; but there was no cry of "Sayre and Liberty" and no change of political direction. Events across the Atlantic were moving too fast for that.

== See also ==
- Intelligence operations in the American Revolutionary War
