= Sir Robert Fagge, 3rd Baronet =

English politician (1673–1736)

Sir Robert Fagge (or Fagg), 3rd Baronet (1673 – 22 June 1736), of Wiston, near Steyning, Sussex, was an English politician who sat in the House of Commons from 1708 to 1710.

Fagge was baptized on 9 August 1673, the second but only surviving son of Sir Robert Fagge, 2nd Baronet and his wife Elizabeth Culpepper, daughter of Benjamin Culpepper of Lindfield, Sussex. He married Christian Bishopp, daughter of Sir Cecil Bishopp, 4th Baronet of Parham, Sussex, in or before 1698.

Fagge was from a Whig family, and was returned as Member of Parliament (MP) for Steyning at the 1708 general election. However, he did not show support for the Whigs in the two indicative votes, for the naturalization of the Palatines in 1709 and for the impeachment of Dr Sacheverell in 1710. He was defeated at the 1710 election.

Fagge succeeded his father in the baronetcy on 26 August 1715. He later stood for the Tories at Steyning at the 1722 general election and at the 1727 general election, but was unsuccessful on both occasions, collecting only two votes in 1727.

Fagge died on 22 June 1736, aged 62, at Horley Heath, near Reigate, and was buried at Albourne on 29 June. He had four sons of whom two predeceased him, and three daughters of whom one predeceased him. He was succeeded in the baronetcy by his son and heir, Robert. His widow Christian died in 1765.

Parliament of Great Britain
Preceded by William Wallis; Viscount Tunbridge	Member of Parliament for Steyning; 1708–1710; With: Viscount Tunbridge (1708–1709); Sir Henry Goring (1709–1710)	Succeeded by William Wallis; Sir Henry Goring
Baronetage of England
Preceded by Robert Fagge	Baronet (of Wiston); 1715–1736	Succeeded by Robert Fagge
