= John Hales (MP for New Shoreham) =

English politician (1648–1723)

John Hales (2 March 1648 – 8 October 1723) was an English politician who sat in the House of Commons from 1679 to 1685.

Hales was an elected Member of Parliament (MP) for New Shoreham in 1679, and held the seat till 1685.

Hales died in October 1723, aged 75. His brother Edward Hales was on the Admiralty commission, and his cousin Edward Hales was MP for Hythe.

== See also ==
- Politics of England

Parliament of England
Preceded by Sir Robert Fagge, Bt; John Cheale	Member of Parliament for New Shoreham; 1679–1685; With: John Cheale; Sir Robert Fagge, Bt	Succeeded by Edward Hungerford; Richard Haddock
