= Stanier Porten =

British diplomatic figure

Sir Stanier Porten (baptised 1716 – 1789) was a British government official and diplomat.

== Life ==
He was the only son of James Porten, a London merchant, of Huguenot descent. The family lived in an old red-brick house adjoining Putney Bridge, but after a failure in business, left in 1748.

Porten entered the diplomatic service, and for some years before 1760 he was British resident at the court of the Kingdom of Naples. He was transferred in April 1760 to the post of consul at Madrid. In July 1766 he was appointed secretary to the extraordinary embassy of William Nassau de Zuylestein, 4th Earl of Rochford to the court of France, and he wrote reports on the mission in 1766–1767.

In November 1768 Porten was appointed as under-secretary to Lord Rochford, then Secretary of State for the Northern Department, and in December 1770 he followed Rochford to the southern branch, remaining under-secretary until 1782. He was knighted on 5 June 1772, appointed keeper of the state papers at Whitehall in 1774, and from 1782 until November 1786 was a commissioner of the customs. He was characterised as the "man of business" in his department, of a grave demeanour.

After a period of illness, Porten died at Kensington Palace on 7 June 1789.

== Legacy ==
Letters to and from Porten went to the Marquis of Abergavenny's manuscripts, and occur in the official papers of Lord Grantham, Sir Robert Gunning, and others, now in the British Library. William Coxe, in his Memoirs of the Kings of Spain of the House of Bourbon, 1700–1788, acknowledged his indebtedness to Porten's papers.

A picture of the Porten family, painted by William Hogarth and the property of the Rev. Thomas Burningham, was shown at the exhibition of old masters in 1888. Stanier Porten was depicted in it as handing a letter to his father.

== Family ==
Porten's youngest sister, Judith, married, on 3 June 1736, Edward Gibbon of Buriton, Hampshire. She was mother of Edward Gibbon, the historian, who spent in his grandfather's house at Putney in 1747–1748, cared for by his eldest aunt, Catherine Porten. After her father's business ruin, she established a boarding-house for Westminster School, in which Gibbon lived, and which proved very successful. She died in April 1786. A third sister married Mr. Darrel of Richmond in Surrey.

As foreseen by Gibbon, Porten married in 1774 Mary Wibault of Titchfield Street, London. They had two surviving children:

- Stanier James Porten (died 1854), B.A., of Brasenose College, Oxford, 1801, and rector of Charlwood, Surrey; and
- Charlotte Porten, who married on 7 February 1798 the Rev. Henry Wise, then rector of Charlwood.

On Porten's death in 1789, Gibbon offered to adopt Charlotte, but was turned down. In his will of 1791, Gibbon made the two children his heirs.
