= William Nassau de Zuylestein, 2nd Earl of Rochford =

British army officer and politician

- Earl of Rochford
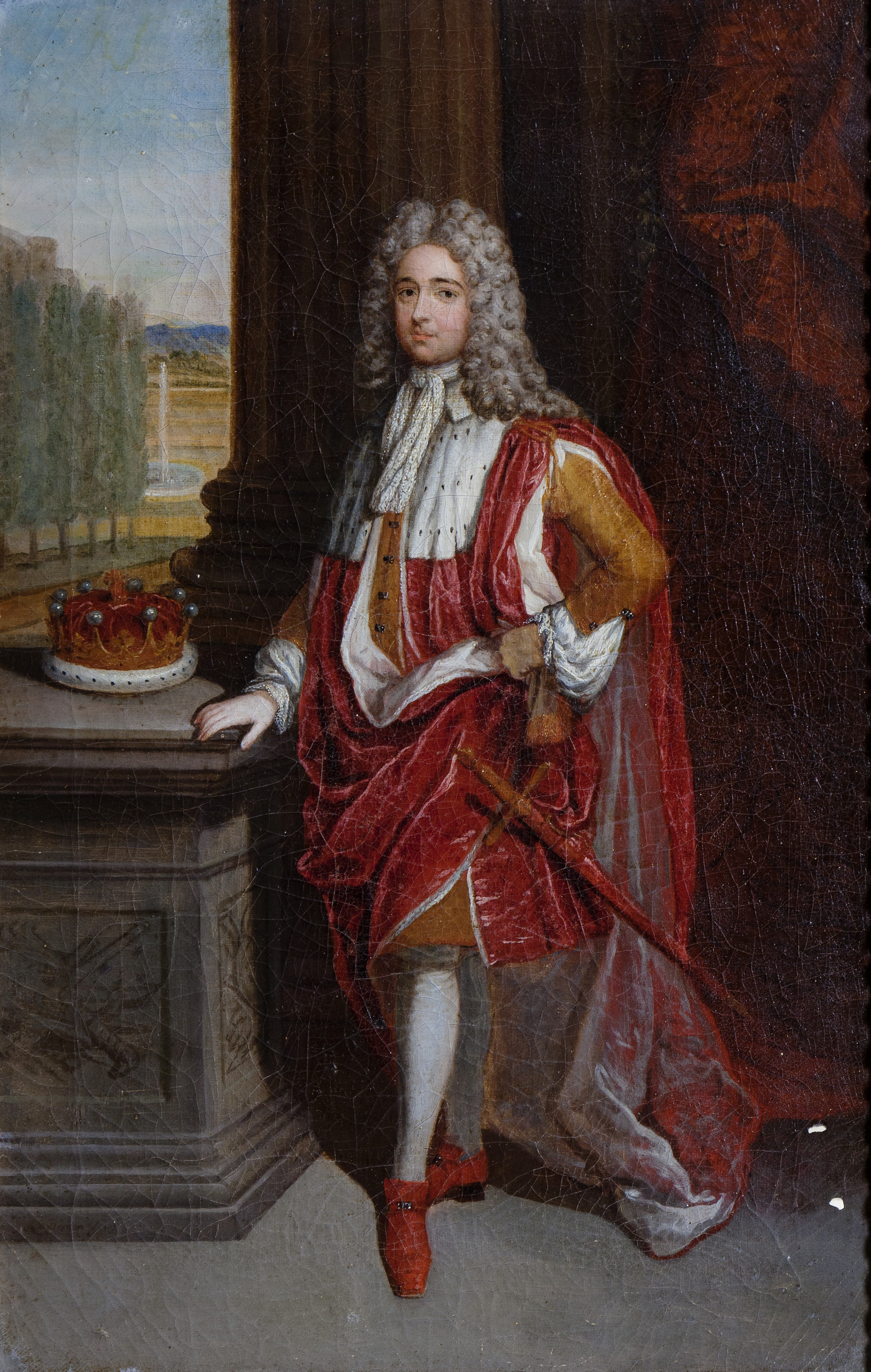

- Coat of arms
- Tenure: 1682–1710
- Predecessor: William Nassau de Zuylestein, 1st Earl of Rochford
- Successor: Frederick Nassau de Zuylestein, 3rd Earl of Rochford
- Born: c. 9 July 1682
- Died: 27 July 1710 (aged 28)

Brigadier-General William Nassau de Zuylestein, 2nd Earl of Rochford (July 1682 – 27 July 1710), styled Viscount Tunbridge from 1695 to 1709, was a British army officer and Whig politician who represented Kilkenny City in the Irish House of Commons from 1705 to 1710 and Steyning in the House of Commons of Great Britain from 1708 until 1709 when he succeeded to the peerage and sat in the House of Lords. Rochford was killed in the War of the Spanish Succession.

De Zuylestein was baptised on 9 July 1682, the eldest son of William Nassau de Zuylestein, 1st Earl of Rochford and his wife Jane, the daughter of army officer and landowner Sir Henry Wroth. Joining the English army, Tunbridge was appointed as an aide-de-camp to John Churchill, 1st Duke of Marlborough in Flanders in 1704, and was commissioned as a lieutenant colonel in Edward Fox’s Regiment of Marines in January 1706. On 12 April, he was commissioned as the colonel of a newly raised regiment of foot of the Irish Army, and on 1 February 1707, Tunbridge was appointed colonel of the 3rd Regiment of Dragoons (succeeding the late Lord Cutts), which embarked for Spain in 1708.

Tunbridge was returned for the Whigs as an Irish member of parliament for Kilkenny City in 1705. He was also returned as a British MP for Steyning at the 1708 British general election. In January 1709, Tunbridge succeeded his father as Earl of Rochford, and vacated his seat in the British House of Commons to sit in the House of Lords. Rochford was promoted to brigadier general in January 1710. He was killed on 27 July 1710 at the Battle of Almenar while leading his regiment at the age of 28. Rochford was succeeded in his peerage by his brother Frederick.

Parliament of Ireland
Preceded by Sir Thomas Smyth; Standish Hartstonge	Member of Parliament for Kilkenny City; 1705–1710; With: Sir Thomas Smyth	Succeeded by Sir Thomas Smyth; Sir Redmond Everard
Parliament of Great Britain
Preceded by Charles Goring; William Wallis	Member of Parliament for Steyning; 1708–1709; With: Robert Fagg	Succeeded by Robert Fagg; Harry Goring
Peerage of England
Preceded by William Nassau de Zuylestein	Earl of Rochford; 1709–1710	Succeeded by Frederick Nassau de Zuylestein
