= William Nassau de Zuylestein, 4th Earl of Rochford =

British courtier, diplomat and politician (1717–1781)

The Right Honourable The Earl of Rochford KG PC
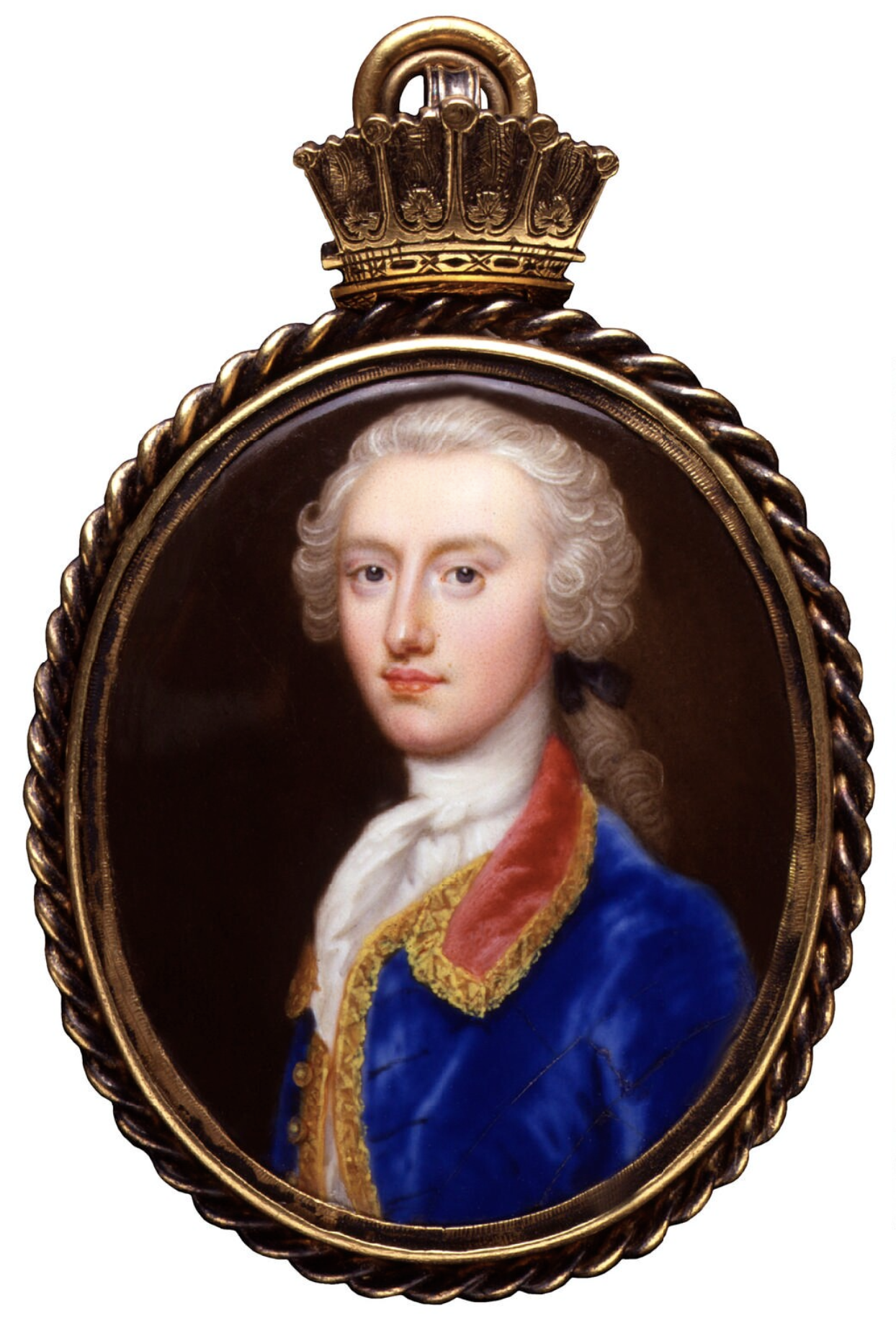
- Portrait by Christian Friedrich Zincke, c. 1740–1745

Secretary of State for the Northern Department
- In office 1768–1770
- Prime Minister: Duke of Grafton
- Preceded by: The Viscount Weymouth
- Succeeded by: The Earl of Sandwich

Secretary of State for the Southern Department
- In office 1770–1775
- Prime Minister: Lord North
- Preceded by: The Viscount Weymouth
- Succeeded by: The Viscount Weymouth

Leader of the House of Lords
- In office 1770–1775
- Prime Minister: Lord North
- Preceded by: The Viscount Weymouth
- Succeeded by: The Earl of Suffolk

Personal details
- Born: 17 September 1717
- Died: 29 September 1781 (aged 64)

William Henry Nassau de Zuylestein, 4th Earl of Rochford, KG, PC (17 September 1717 O.S. – 29 September 1781) was a British courtier, diplomat and politician. He occupied senior ambassadorial posts at Madrid and Paris, and served as Secretary of State in both the Northern and Southern Departments. He is credited with the earliest-known introduction of the Lombardy poplar to England in 1754.

He was a personal friend of such major cultural figures as the actor David Garrick, the novelist Laurence Sterne, and the French playwright Beaumarchais. George III valued Rochford as his expert advisor on foreign affairs in the early 1770s, and as a loyal and hard-working cabinet minister. Rochford was the only British secretary of state between 1760 and 1778 who had been a career diplomat.

Rochford played key roles in the Manila Ransom negotiation with Spain (1763–66), the French acquisition of Corsica (1768), the Falkland Islands crisis of 1770–1, the crisis following the Swedish Revolution of 1772, and the aftermath of the Royal Marriages Act 1772. In addition to his work as foreign secretary, he carried a heavy burden of domestic responsibilities in the early 1770s, especially Irish affairs. He was a key member of the North administration in the early phase of the American War of Independence. Illness and a political scandal forced him from office in November 1775.

== Early life ==
William Henry Nassau van Zuylestein was born in 1717, the elder son of Frederick Nassau van Zuylestein, 3rd Earl of Rochford, and his wife Elizabeth ('Bessy') Savage, daughter of the 4th Earl Rivers. His ancestry was Anglo-Dutch, descended in an illegitimate line from William the Silent's son Frederick Henry (1584–1647), Prince of Orange. Rochford's grandfather and great-grandfather both had English wives, ladies-in-waiting at the courts of William II and William III of Orange. His grandfather was a close companion of William III, accompanying him to England in the Glorious Revolution of 1688–9, and later rewarded with the earldom of Rochford.

Educated at Eton College (1725–32) as Viscount Tunbridge, Rochford's school friends included three future secretaries of state, Conway, Halifax and Sandwich. However, he also made a lifelong enemy at Eton of the Prime minister's son, the influential writer Horace Walpole. Instead of going to university, Rochford was sent to the Academy at Geneva, where he lodged with the family of Professor Antoine Maurice. From Geneva he emerged as fluent in French as he was in Dutch and English, and succeeded his father as 4th Earl of Rochford in 1738 at the age of twenty-one.

== Courtier ==
Rochford was appointed a Gentleman of the Bedchamber to George II in 1739 (a mark of special royal favour) and served in this role until 1749. He inherited strong Whig principles and was a loyal supporter of the Hanoverian Protestant succession, but also admired Sir Robert Walpole's peaceful foreign policy. At the time of the 1745 Jacobite rebellion he offered to raise a regiment, but this was not needed. He was active in Essex politics in the government's interest, but he was no orator and made no impression in the House of Lords. He was appointed Vice-Admiral of Essex in 1748. Though ambitious for high political office, he avoided the factions and cultivated the King's son, the Duke of Cumberland, as his patron. Cumberland successfully lobbied for Rochford to be given a diplomatic post at the end of the War of the Austrian Succession, and he was named Envoy to Turin in January 1749.

== Envoy at Turin ==
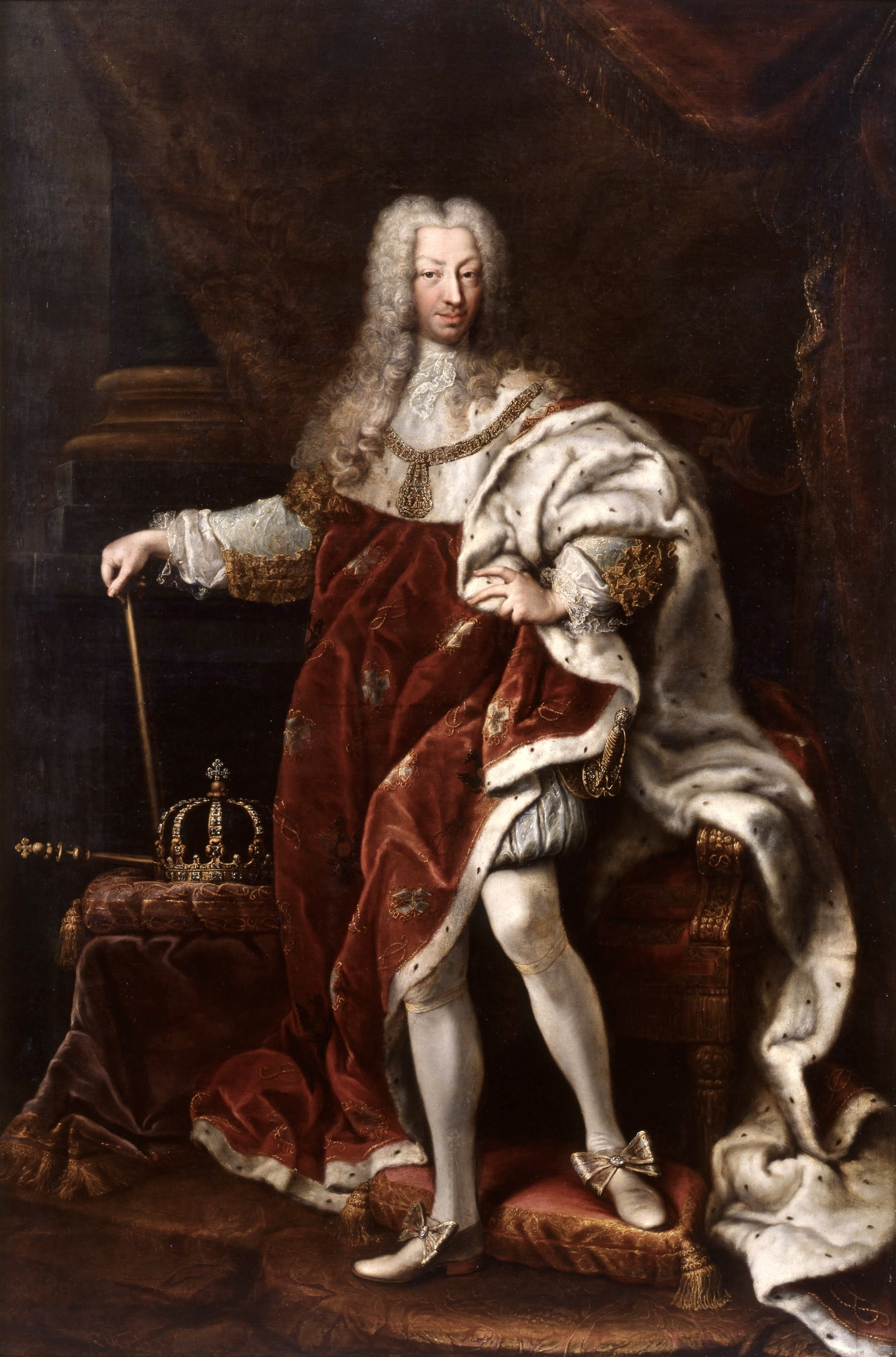
Charles Emmanuel III, whom Rochford developed a close relationship with

Rochford arrived at Turin on 9 September 1749. This was still the most important of the Italian courts for British foreign policy at this time, and he started as Envoy Extraordinary and Plenipotentiary, the highest rank in the British diplomatic service short of ambassador. However, he had agreed to accept an ordinary Envoy's salary for a probationary period, and this gave him a strong incentive to show zeal and become a thoroughly professional diplomat. His first negotiations, on behalf of a company of English miners and the Protestant Vaudois communities of the Piedmont Alps, were entirely successful, and he then obtained his full salary. He ingratiated himself with King Charles Emmanuel III by accompanying him on early morning hunting rides. Rochford made useful friends at court, and was highly regarded by the diplomatic corps at Turin. He played a minor but useful role in the complex negotiations for the Treaty of Aranjuez (1752). He made a tour of Italy in 1753 and used a spy to gain intelligence of the Young Pretender's court at Rome. He also made full use of British consuls in the region to obtain information about trade matters and French involvement in Corsica, rewarding them with the removal of the duty on British shipping at Villafranca.

== Lord Lieutenant of Essex ==
Recalled from Turin for the duration of the Seven Years' War (1755–63), Rochford resumed his career as a courtier, appointed by George II as First Lord of the Bedchamber and Groom of the Stole, highly prestigious posts. He was also appointed a member of the Privy Council in 1755. As Lord Lieutenant of Essex from May 1756, Rochford was closely involved in forming the Essex regiment of militia, becoming its Colonel in November 1759. At the death of George II in 1760 Rochford lost his lucrative court posts, but was compensated with a generous pension. He spent the early 1760s involved in local Essex politics and 'improved' the Park at his St Osyth estate, adding a formal Dutch garden and a maze. However, his landed income was small for an earl, and a return to diplomacy became a financial necessity. He was named Ambassador to Spain on 18 June 1763.

== Ambassador to Spain and France ==
Rochford's secret instructions for his Madrid embassy were mainly concerned with countering French influence over the king, Carlos III, and reporting on Spain's naval reconstruction after her late and disastrous entry into the Seven Years' War. His first major negotiation resulted from Spain's expulsion of British logwood cutters from the Yucatán Peninsula in Honduras. With strong support from Grenville's administration, Rochford's threats of naval force made the Spanish back down, but gave him a reputation as an anti-Bourbon. Less successful were his efforts to compel Spain to pay the disputed Manila Ransom, which the French foreign minister Étienne François de Choiseul, Duke of Choiseul suggested should be submitted to arbitration. Rochford's alertness uncovered a French plot to set fire to British naval dockyards, a scheme which was postponed until 1770. His friendship with the British consul-general at Madrid, Stanier Porten (uncle of the historian Edward Gibbon) deepened his interest in trade matters, and he used the consuls as well as paid spies to get accurate information about Spain's naval rebuilding. While at Madrid he befriended the young French playwright Beaumarchais, whose experiences in Spain later formed the basis of his play The Marriage of Figaro. Near the close of his embassy, Rochford was an eyewitness to the Esquilache Riots of 1766.

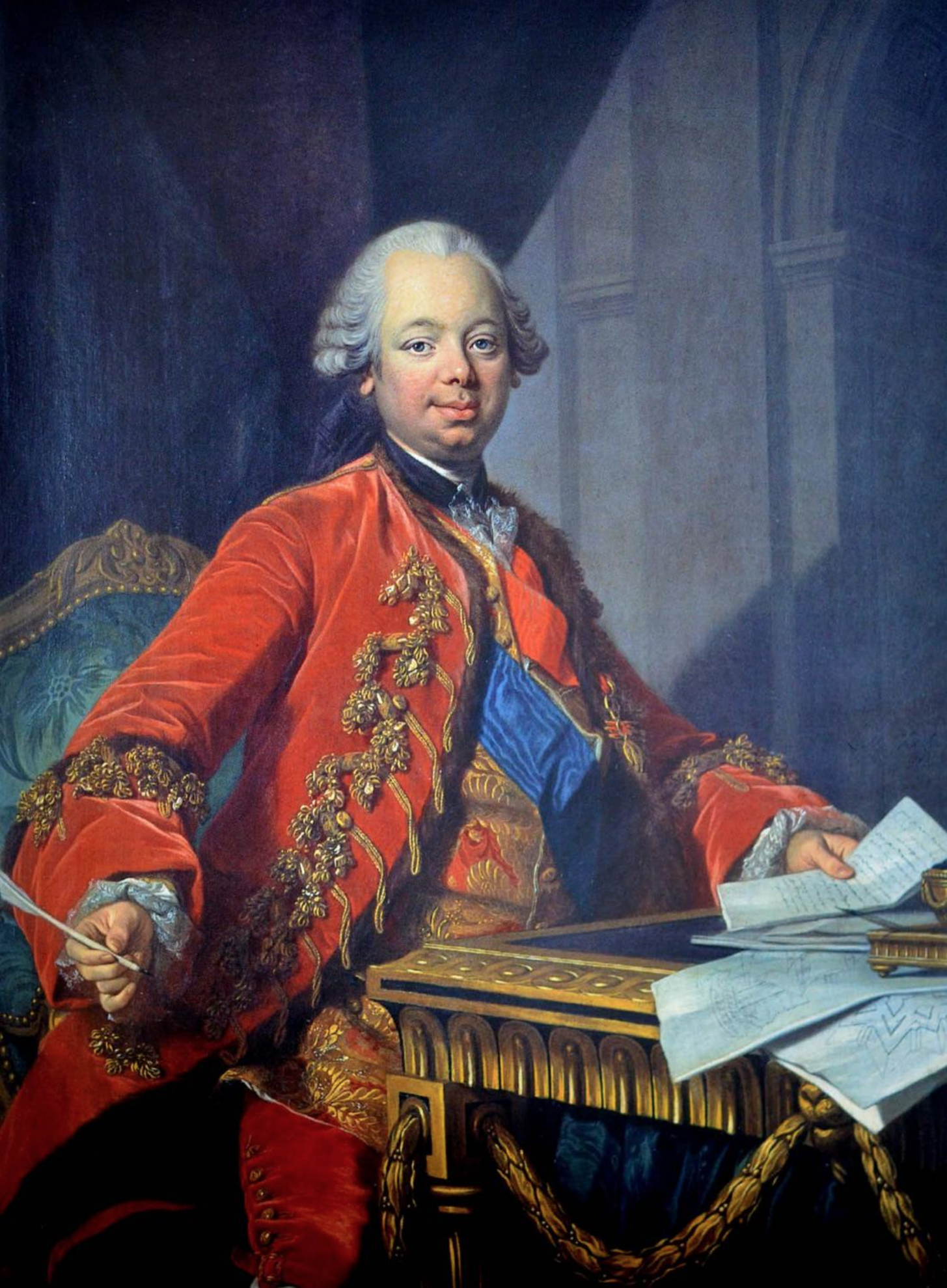
The Duke of Choiseul, with whom Rochford had an acrimonious relationship

Rochford's appointment to Paris was unexpected, and he left Madrid in such haste that he had to pawn his plate to settle his debts. He insisted on taking the exceptionally capable Porten to Paris as his secretary of embassy. Choiseul at once embroiled Rochford in a scheme to trade off Britain's claim to the Manila ransom for relinquishment of the Falkland Islands, but the misreporting of a previous ambassador, Lord Hertford, and the inexperience of the secretary of state, Lord Shelburne, wrecked this transaction. Choiseul was furious, and unfairly blamed Rochford. Rochford was almost the only member of the diplomatic corps at Paris brave enough to stand up to Choiseul's bullying, and their negotiations over such matters as Dunkirk, the Canada Bills and the East India Company's claim for compensation for wartime expenses in India were often acrimonious. Rochford prepared thoroughly and mastered the details, winning grudging concessions from Choiseul on all three issues.

Choiseul's greatest coup (and Rochford's greatest failure) concerned France's secret acquisition of Corsica from the Republic of Genoa in 1768. Though Rochford gave early warning of the likely terms, and paid a spy to get a copy of the draft treaty, the British cabinet led by Lord Grafton was too preoccupied by rioting in London and failed to support their ambassador in Paris. Rochford also had the misfortune to fall seriously ill for a fortnight at the height of the crisis, enabling Choiseul to clinch the deal with Genoa. Britain's protests thereafter were ineffectual, and an angry Rochford returned to London to resign his embassy. Instead, he was offered a cabinet seat, which he finally accepted on 21 October 1768, on condition that Porten became his under-secretary.

== Northern Secretary ==
Contemporary observers such as Edmund Burke and the anonymous letter-writer Junius thought it odd that Rochford was appointed northern secretary when all of his diplomatic experience had been in southern courts, but Lord Weymouth had insisted on taking the Southern Department as the more important of the secretaryships. British foreign policy, and Britain's reputation in Europe, had sunk to their lowest ebb of the eighteenth century thanks to the 1768 Corsican fiasco, but Rochford's realistic and capable handling of his new portfolio strengthened British foreign policy in several ways. British diplomats abroad were relieved to be dealing with a secretary of state who knew the business of diplomacy, and regularly kept them informed. Hamish Scott has suggested that Rochford 'almost single-handed' averted the impending shipwreck for Britain's reputation in Europe.

Britain's main goal at this time was a treaty of alliance with Russia, but the Empress Catherine II and her foreign minister Panin insisted on a hefty subsidy, which Rochford refused. Instead he persuaded George III to pour secret service money into Swedish politics, to support Russia and undermine French influence. Britain's envoy at Stockholm, Sir John Goodricke, made adroit use of this money, and helped to maintain Sweden's liberal constitution. According to Michael Roberts, Rochford was much more practical and realistic than Choiseul in his handling of Swedish affairs.

== Falklands Crisis ==
Spain's expulsion of a British garrison from the Falkland Islands in May 1770 sparked a major diplomatic crisis that brought Europe to the brink of war. Historians have hitherto attributed the resolution of this crisis to a 'secret promise' by the British Prime Minister Lord North that Britain would quietly evacuate the islands at some future date if the Spanish agreed to disavow their officers and restore the fort to Britain. Recent research in the foreign diplomatic archives suggests an entirely different view of the British side of this crisis. Far from resolving the crisis, North's 'secret promise' nearly wrecked an agreed policy of firm response backed by the threat of naval force. This was Rochford's policy, backed by George III. Though he was Northern Secretary in 1770, Rochford's advice to cabinet as a former ambassador to Madrid and Paris was decisive. Weymouth's laziness and frequent absences left his Southern portfolio for Rochford to manage as well as his own. It was Rochford who ordered the Admiralty to prepare a fleet for war, and sent a simple demand for disavowal and restitution to Madrid. Spain's response crucially depended on French support in the event of war, and France began to prepare a fleet, but the French king's dismissal of Choiseul in December 1770 removed that prospect, and the recall of the British envoy Harris from Madrid showed that Britain was still prepared to go to war. Weymouth also resigned in December 1770, and Rochford replaced him as southern secretary on 19 December 1770.

== Southern Secretary ==
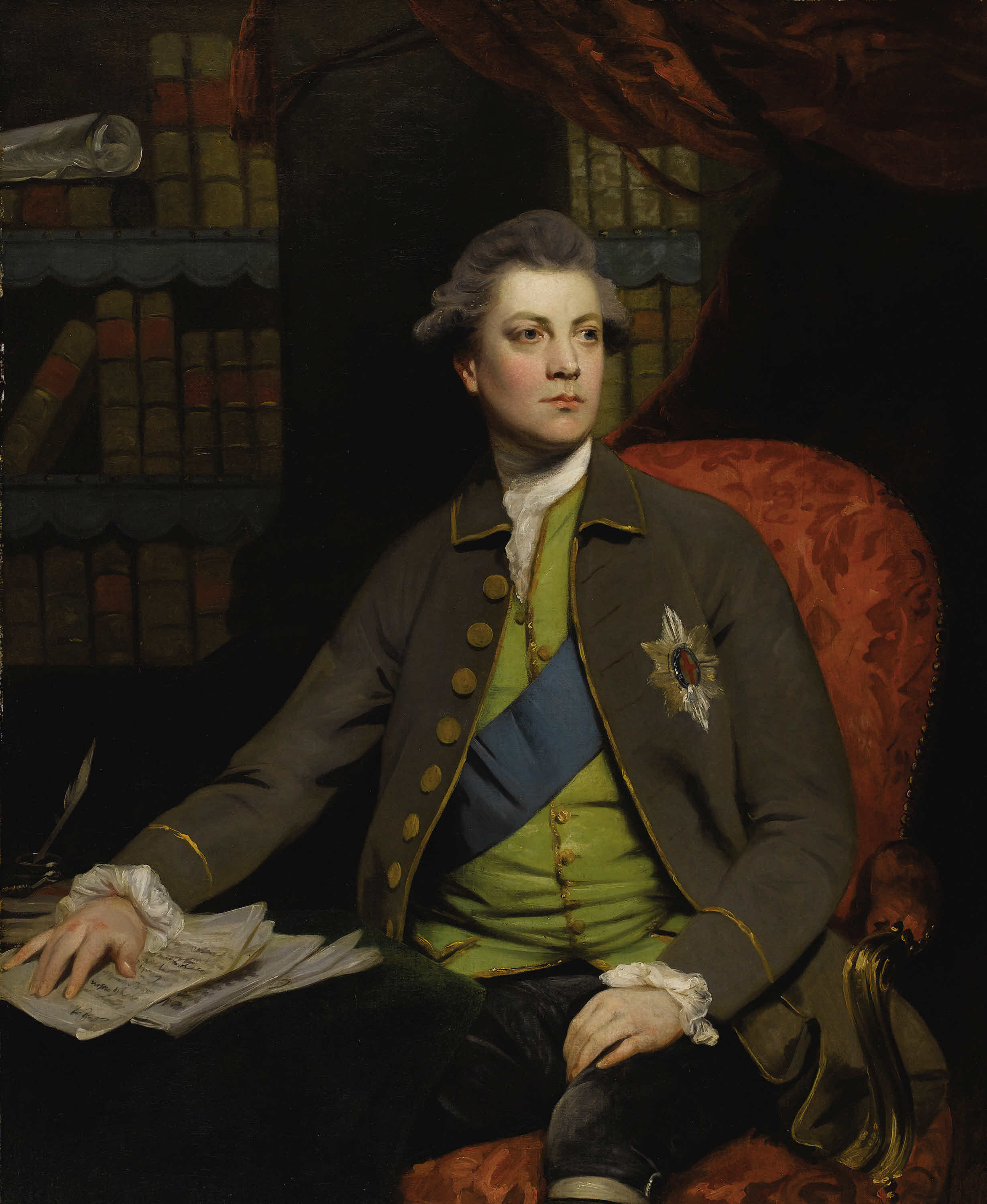
Lord Suffolk, who succeeded Rochford as Northern Secretary

Rochford had already taken charge of the Falklands negotiation, and now received the Spanish acceptance of his demands. The disarmament talks over the next few months were often stormy, however, and there was still a risk of war until April 1771, when all sides disarmed simultaneously, as Rochford had proposed. After Sandwich was named as First Lord of the Admiralty, Rochford's successor as northern secretary was Lord Suffolk, who spent a year improving his French so that he could converse with the foreign diplomats in London. In the meantime, Rochford was de facto foreign minister, handling all of Britain's diplomatic correspondence until 1772. Before the creation of separate Home and Foreign offices in 1782, the Southern Secretary carried a heavy burden of domestic responsibilities, including oversight of Ireland. The Irish correspondence almost equalled the rest of Rochford's domestic correspondence across 1771–5.

Rochford's first successes as Southern Secretary were to persuade the new French foreign minister the duc d'Aiguillon to settle the long-standing Canada Bills dispute, and to forestall a French attempt to reinforce their depleted possessions in India. After George III's clumsy intervention in Denmark in 1772 to support his disgraced sister, Queen Caroline, Rochford's first big challenge as southern secretary was the Swedish crisis of 1772–3, following the constitutional coup by Gustavus III in August 1772. This crisis again brought Europe to the brink of war, as Russia threatened to invade Sweden and France threatened to send a fleet to the Baltic to support Gustavus. Rochford played a key role in this crisis, advising caution to the Russians and warning the French that Britain would also send a fleet to the Baltic. Panin finally decided not to invade, and the crisis eased as the French switched their naval armament from Brest to Toulon.

The First Partition of Poland in 1772 had, as Rochford noted, 'changed absolutely the System of Europe', demonstrating the emergence of Russia and Prussia as predatory new powers. With encouragement from George III, Rochford had embarked on a risky new policy of secret friendship with France, with the long-term goal of forming a defensive alliance of the maritime colonial powers as a counterbalance to the 'eastern powers'. The Swedish crisis wrecked this initiative, and Rochford then turned to cultivate friendship with Spain, in an attempt to 'drive a wedge' into the Family Compact. Relations with both Bourbon powers were more cordial by 1775 than they had been since 1763, but France's clandestine support for the American colonies increasingly negated one leg of this policy.

Rochford's most difficult domestic duty as southern secretary was to act on behalf of George III in the painful negotiations of May 1773 with his brother, the Duke of Gloucester, who had secretly married Horace Walpole's niece, Maria Waldegrave, in 1766. She was now pregnant, and Gloucester wanted an assurance of financial support for his family. In view of the Royal Marriages Act of 1772, George III regarded this news as a betrayal by his most trusted sibling, and was deeply hurt, refusing at first to make any reply. Rochford was the only cabinet member willing to act as intermediary. Horace Walpole's dislike for Rochford now turned to bitter hatred. He vilified Rochford because he could not openly vilify the king.

== Retirement and death ==
Poor health and the bungled arrest of an American banker in London, Stephen Sayre, on suspicion of a plot to kidnap George III, prompted Rochford's retirement on 11 November 1775, with a generous pension and a promise of the 'Blue Ribband' (Knight of the Garter). He was twice offered the lucrative viceroyalty of Ireland in 1776, and would have been an ideal candidate, but he declined on health grounds. On 12 June 1776 Rochford was elected Master of Trinity House, the corporation responsible for lighthouses, pilots and mariners' welfare. On behalf of George III he also undertook secret talks with Beaumarchais, and made a quick trip incognito to Paris to try to persuade the French government to stop sending aid to the American rebels, concluding that France was about to declare open war. He became a Knight of the Garter in 1779. His last years were devoted to the Essex Militia, even after the threat of a French invasion had passed. He died at St Osyth on 29 September 1781. He was succeeded by his bachelor nephew, at whose death in 1830 the Rochford title became extinct.

== Personal life ==
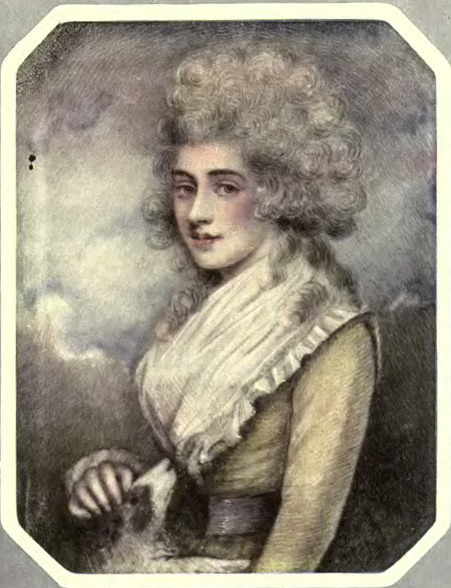
Lucy Yonge, Rochford's wife

In May 1742 Rochford married Lucy Younge, daughter of Edward Younge of Durnford in Wiltshire, but the marriage produced no children. Rochford and Lucy first lived at Easton in Suffolk, a property inherited from his uncle Henry Nassau, and they only moved to the family seat at St Osyth in Essex after the death of Rochford's mother in 1746. Rochford also bought a town house in London, at 48 Berkeley Square, which he owned until 1777. The Rochfords allowed each considerable freedom in their personal lives, even by the rather relaxed standards of the eighteenth century nobility, and Lucy Rochford was notorious for her numerous lovers, who included the Duke of Cumberland and the Prince of Hesse. Rochford had mistresses at Turin, one of whom, an opera-dancer named Signora Banti, followed him to London, but he never acknowledged her children as his own. Lucy objected to this expensive mistress, and Rochford agreed to give her up if Lucy also gave up her current lover, Lord Thanet. She responded that he was not a drain on their finances, but quite the contrary.

Rochford's next mistress, Martha Harrison, gave him a daughter, Maria Nassau, who was adopted by Lucy as her surrogate daughter. Maria lived with them in Paris, and thereafter at St Osyth. Rochford had affairs in Paris with the wives of two of Choiseul's friends, the marquise de Laborde and Mme Latournelle. Another mistress, Ann Labbee Johnson, followed him to London and bore him a son and daughter. After Lucy's death in 1773 Rochford brought Ann and the children to live with him at St Osyth. His will made her sole executrix of his estate and paid tribute to her 'friendship and affection'.

In his youth Rochford was an accomplished horseman and an expert yachtsman, once racing his yacht from Harwich to London against that of Richard Rigby, and was also involved in early Essex cricket matches. He used his yacht to visit his estates at Zuylestein in Holland's Utrecht province. He was an enthusiast for English country dancing, fostering their popularity at the court of Turin in the 1750s. His greatest loves (apart from his various mistresses) were the theatre, music and opera. (He played the baroque guitar.) Confessing himself 'excessively curious for plants', he collected specimens on a visit to the Swiss Alps in 1751 to send home to St Osyth. Most famously, he is credited with the first known introduction of the Lombardy poplar to southern England, bringing home a sapling strapped to the centre-pole of his carriage in 1754.

== Legacy and significance ==
With no spectacular triumphs or major treaties to his name, and with his most important secret negotiations unknown at the time, Rochford was soon forgotten after his death. His reputation also suffered at the hands of Horace Walpole, who never missed a chance to belittle Rochford. In his Memoirs of the Reign of King George III, Walpole described Rochford as 'a man of no abilities and of as little knowledge, except in the routine of office'. Yet elsewhere Walpole had recognised Rochford's honesty and flexibility. The disappearance of Rochford's personal papers (until those relating to his Turin appointment were rediscovered in 1971) meant that historians had very little with which to reconstruct his personal life, but many of his letters have survived in their recipients' collections, especially those of Garrick and Denbigh.

Detailed research in British and foreign diplomatic archives has enabled a more accurate assessment of the 4th Earl of Rochford's public career. As a diplomat he was thoroughly professional, in an age of titled amateurs. He was businesslike and methodical, mastering the detail of complex negotiations, and was widely respected as a tough negotiator and an honest broker. His diplomatic experience proved invaluable when he became secretary of state, and it is clear from the foreign archives how well he managed British foreign policy up to the outbreak of the American War of Independence. He was exceptionally well-informed, and his unpublished Plan to Prevent War in Europe (1775) reveals him as a strategic thinker, and one of the most imaginative of Britain's eighteenth century secretaries of state.

George III once remarked on Rochford's 'many amiable qualities', adding that his 'Zeal makes him rather in a hurry'. The king also told Stanier Porten that Rochford was 'more active and had more spirit' than anyone else in the North cabinet of the early 1770s. Hamish Scott has described Rochford as 'the ablest man to control foreign policy in the first decade of peace [after 1763], a statesman of intelligence, perception and considerable application'.

Rochford's major diplomatic legacy was his policy of trying to detach Spain from the Family Compact with France. In his last year in office Rochford had reassured the Spanish ministers that Britain wanted them to remain neutral and would not strike first. He also warned the Spanish that their colonies in Central and South America might be tempted to follow the example of the rebellious North American colonies. These considerations meant that Spain did not automatically join France in open war at sea in 1778, but delayed for another year. That British commanders in America squandered the time thus gained was not Rochford's fault. Historians now agree that the American rebels won the war mainly because Britain's naval resources were too thinly stretched by the involvement of the Bourbon powers.

== Chronology ==
- 1717 – birth of William Henry Nassau van Zuylestein at St Osyth
- 1725–38 – educated at Eton College and the academy, Geneva
- 1738 – succeeds his father as 4th Earl of Rochford
- 1738–49 – Lord of the Bedchamber to George II
- 1748 – Vice-Admiral of the coasts of Essex
- 1749–55 – Envoy Extraordinary at the court of Turin
- 1755–60 – member of the Privy Council, Groom of the Stole to George II
- 1756 – Lord Lieutenant of Essex
- 1759 – Colonel of the Essex Militia
- 1763–66 – Ambassador to Spain
- 1766 – witnesses the Madrid Riots
- 1766–68 – Ambassador to France
- 1768 – fails to prevent French acquisition of Corsica
- 1768–70 – Secretary of State, Northern Department
- 1770–71 – takes charge in Falklands Crisis
- 1770–75 – Secretary of State, Southern Department
- 1773 – conducts secret negotiations with France
- 1773 – helps resolve the Swedish Crisis
- 1775 – unpublished 'Plan to Prevent War in Europe'
- 1775–81 – retirement
- 1776 – Master of Trinity House
- 1779 – Knight of the Garter
- 1781 – dies at St Osyth on 29 September

== Arms ==
The earls of Rochford used the arms below, inherited via the founder of their Family Fredrick of Nassau, lord of Zuylestein, illegitimate son of Frederick Henry, Prince of Orange.

Arms of Nassau-Zuylestein. The 3 pillars are known as "Zuylen" in Dutch.

== See also ==
- List of ambassadors of Great Britain to France

Diplomatic posts
| Preceded by Arthur Villettes as Resident | British Minister at Turin; 1749–1755 | Succeeded by George Hervey, 2nd Earl of Bristol |
| Vacant no relations due to war Title last held by George Hervey, 2nd Earl of Bristol | British ambassador to Spain; 1763–1766 | Succeeded by Sir James Gray, Bt |
| Preceded by The Duke of Richmond | British Ambassador to France; 1766–1768 | Succeeded by The Earl Harcourt |
Political offices
| Preceded by The Viscount Weymouth | Secretary of State for the Northern Department; 1768–1770 | Succeeded by The Earl of Sandwich |
| Preceded by The Viscount Weymouth | Secretary of State for the Southern Department; 1770–1775 | Succeeded by The Viscount Weymouth |
| Preceded by The Viscount Weymouth | Leader of the House of Lords; 1770–1775 | Succeeded by The Earl of Suffolk |
Honorary titles
| Vacant Title last held by The 1st Earl Waldegrave | Vice-Admiral of Essex; 1748–1781 | Succeeded by The Lord Howard de Walden |
| Preceded by The Earl Fitzwalter | Lord Lieutenant of Essex; 1756–1781 | Succeeded by The 3rd Earl Waldegrave |
Peerage of England
| Preceded by Frederick Nassau de Zuylestein | Earl of Rochford; 1738–1781 | Succeeded by William Nassau de Zuylestein |
