= Henry Wroth =

Sir Henry Wroth (died 22 September 1671) was an English army officer and landowner. He was second son of Henry Wroth, the youngest son of MP Sir Robert Wroth. During the English Civil War, Wroth fought on the Royalist side, and was knighted by Charles I of England at Oxford on 15 September 1645. He subsequently switched sides to the Parliamentarians and recovered his seized estate by paying the Committee for Compounding with Delinquents £60. Wroth was later granted land in Ireland and inherited Durrants, an estate in Enfield, Middlesex, from his uncle John upon the latter's death. In 1661, he was commissioned into the English Army at the rank of captain, commanding a troop of the Royal Horse Guards.

In May 1664, commanding a detachment of cavalrymen, he escorted prisoner John Hutchinson from the Tower of London to Sandown Castle, Kent, where Hutchinson would die on 11 September. Wroth was a patron of clergyman Thomas Fuller, who dedicated his 1650 work Pisgah Sight to him; Fuller also often visited Wroth at Durrants. Wroth married Anne Maynard, the daughter of MP William Maynard, 1st Baron Maynard, and had several children with her, including a daughter named Jane who married William Nassau de Zuylestein, 1st Earl of Rochford in 1681. Wroth died on 22 September 1671.
