= William Nassau de Zuylestein, 1st Earl of Rochford =

Dutch soldier and diplomat (1649–1708)

William Hendrik of Nassau, Lord of Zuylestein, 1st Earl of Rochford (1649 – 12 July 1708) was a Dutch soldier and diplomat in the service of his cousin William III of England. During the reign of James II of England he travelled to England to liaise with William's English supporters, and played an important part in the preparations of the Glorious Revolution.

== Background and family ==
William Hendrick was born at Zuylestein Castle (also spelled Zuylenstein), about twenty miles east of the city of Utrecht, the eldest son of Frederick Nassau de Zuylestein. His father was the illegitimate but oldest son of William III's grandfather, Prince Frederick Henry. William Hendrick was therefore a half-cousin of William III, albeit illegitimate. His mother was Mary Killigrew, the eldest daughter of Sir William Killigrew. She was a first cousin of Charles II's illegitimate daughter, the Countess of Yarmouth. She had moved to the Netherlands in February 1644, aged barely seventeen, as a maid of honour to Mary, Princess Royal and Princess of Orange, and married Frederick in 1648. With the death of his father in 1672, William Hendrick inherited Zuylestein Castle and its lands, by which he became known as Lord of Zuylestein (in Dutch: Heer van Zuylestein).

== Career ==
William Henry entered the Dutch cavalry in 1672, but was better known at The Hague for his good looks and gallantry, and as a companion of the prince of Orange. He was trusted by the prince, and acquitted himself well on a mission of observation to England in August 1687, the nominal purpose being to condole with the queen-consort upon the death of her mother Laura, Dowager Duchess of Modena.

=== Glorious Revolution ===
He was again named envoy in the summer of the following year. His avowed purpose was now to felicitate the Queen Consort, Mary of Modena, on the birth of a prince; his real object to inform himself about the nation and to gauge the probability of James II's summoning a parliament and adopting a more conciliatory policy. He was received by the queen at St. James's on 28 June 1688, and the cordiality of his messages inspired the Queen to write a letter of playful affection to her ‘dear lemon’ (the Princess of Orange); but he wrote at once an account of the sceptical manner in which the birth was received in London, and intrigued with all the prominent malcontents. Clarendon records a number of his movements during July.

He returned with Sidney to The Hague early in August, taking with him letters to William from Nottingham, Churchill, Herbert, Bishop Henry Compton, Sunderland, and others. On his return he was promoted a major-general in the Dutch army. On 16 October he embarked on the same ship as William at Helvoetsluys. On 15 December he was sent by William from Windsor with a message urging James to stay at Rochester and not on any account return to London. He found on his arrival that James had already returned to Whitehall, and Zuylestein promptly followed him. In response to William's blunt message, James expressed a hope that the prince might be induced to meet him at Whitehall. Zuylestein was ready with an uncompromising answer to the effect that the prince would not enter London while any royal troops remained in it. This had the desired effect of scaring James from the palace.

=== Military career ===
Zuylestein was naturalised in England on 11 May 1689, and was appointed master of the robes to the king on 23 May, holding the post down to 1695. His regiment was retained for service in the north of England; in May 1691 it was at Durham. He accompanied William to Ireland, but in August 1690 left the campaign there on a mission to Whitehall. On 12 September 1690 he was promoted a lieutenant-general in the English army. In January 1691 he accompanied William to Holland. In July 1693, in the sanguinary battle of Neerwinden, after distinguishing himself, Zuylestein was slightly wounded and taken to Namur; he was exchanged and returned to the camp on 8 August. In November 1693 his regiment was again ordered to Flanders.

On 10 May 1695, Zuylestein was created Earl of Rochford, together with the subsidiary titles Baron Enfield and Viscount Tunbridge, and received a grant of part of the estates of William Herbert, 1st Marquess of Powis, who had followed James II into exile, including Powis Castle. He took his seat in the House of Lords on 20 February 1696. On 25 December 1695, he received a pension of £1,000 per annum. He also received grants of land in Ireland amounting to 30,512 acres.

== Personal life ==
On 25 January 1681, William Hendrick married Jane, daughter of Sir Henry Wroth of Durrants, Enfield, and of Loughton House in Essex. She had gone over to the low countries as maid of honour to William's wife Mary. Zuylestein seduced Jane, and then refused the promised marriage, being strongly encouraged in this course of conduct by William. Mary was dismayed by this proceeding, and deputed Thomas Ken to persuade the count to keep his word and marry the lady. Ken prevailed on the count, and himself performed the wedding ceremony secretly in Mary's chapel while the prince was absent hunting. William was angry, and Ken had temporarily to withdraw from The Hague. The couple became the parents of at least two sons.

William Hendrick's later years were passed in comparative seclusion, for the most part in the Dutch Republic, where William visited him in 1697. He died at his estate, Zuylenstein in the province of Utrecht, in January 1709. William Nassau de Zuylestein was succeeded by his son William Nassau de Zuylestein, 2nd Earl of Rochford; another son was Frederick Nassau de Zuylestein, 3rd Earl of Rochford

== Arms ==
William and his heirs used the arms below, inherited from his father.

Arms of Nassau-Zuylestein. The 3 pillars are known as "Zuylen" in Dutch.

Peerage of England
New creation	Earl of Rochford; 1695–1709	Succeeded by William Nassau de Zuylestein
