= Sir Robert Fagge, 2nd Baronet =

English politician

Sir Robert Fagge, 2nd Baronet (ca. 1649 – 22 August 1715) was an English politician.

He was the son of Sir John Fagg, 1st Baronet and brother of John Fagg II. Fagge was admitted to St Catharine's College, Cambridge in 1663, and to the Inner Temple in 1664.

He sat as Member of Parliament for New Shoreham between 1679 and 1681 and for Steyning between 1690 and 1695 and again between 1701 and 1702. He succeeded his father as second Baronet in 1701.

He married Elizabeth Culpeper and was succeeded by their only son, Sir Robert Fagge, 3rd Baronet.

Parliament of England
| Preceded by Henry Goring; Sir Anthony Dean | Member of Parliament for New Shoreham; 1679–1681; With: John Cheale | Succeeded by John Hales; John Cheale |
| Preceded by James Morton; Sir John Fagge, Bt | Member of Parliament for Steyning; 1690–1695; With: Sir John Fagg, Bt | Succeeded by Edward Hungerford; Sir John Fagg, Bt |
| Preceded by Edward Hungerford; Sir John Fagg, Bt | Member of Parliament for Steyning; 1701–1702; With: Edward Hungerford | Succeeded by Edward Hungerford; Charles Goring |
Baronetage of England
| Preceded by John Fagge | Baronet (of Wiston); 1701–1715 | Succeeded by Robert Fagge |
