= Easton, Suffolk =

Village in Suffolk, England

Coordinates: 52°10′46″N 1°20′13″E

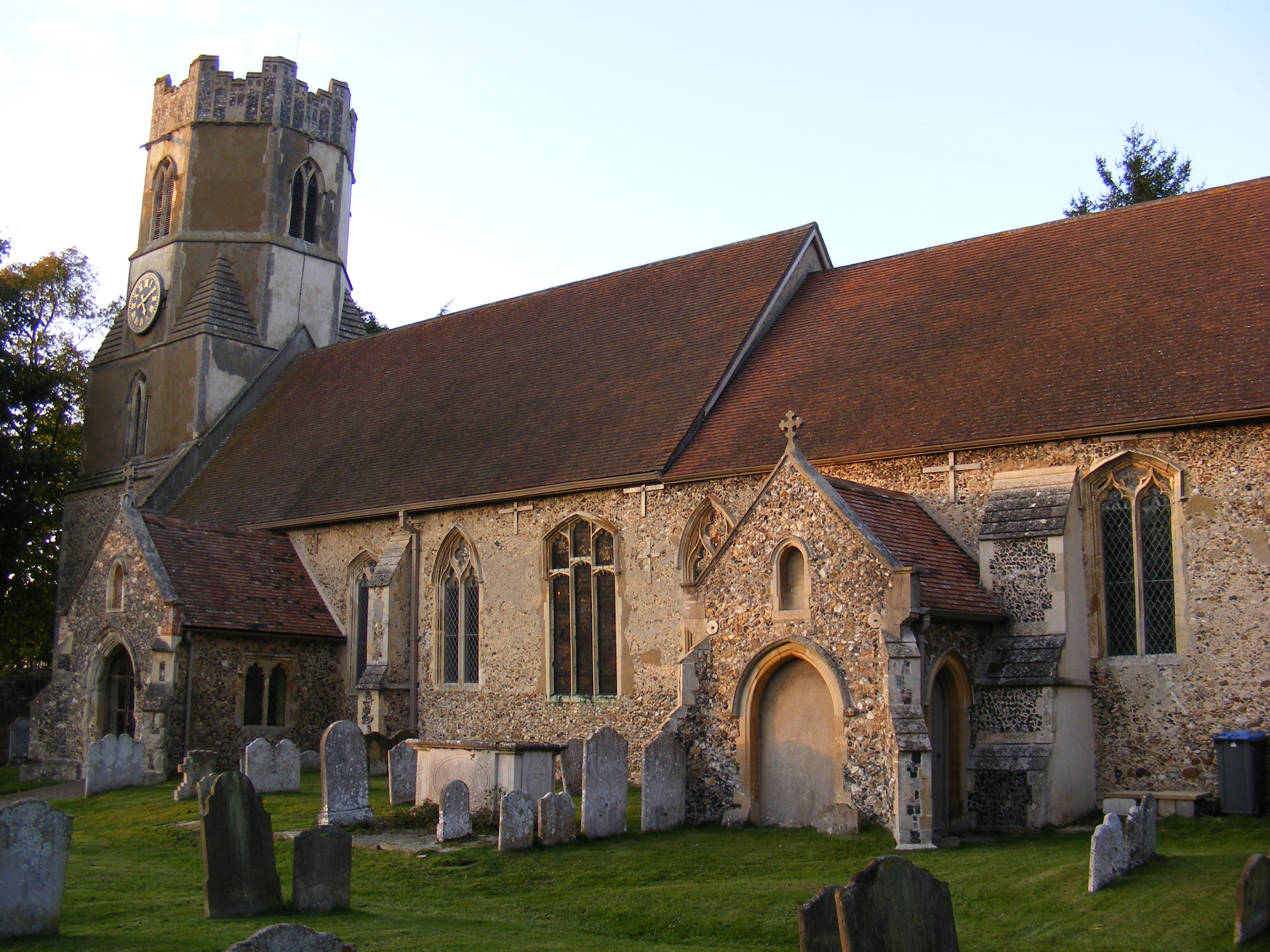
Church of All Saints, Easton

Easton in England is situated on the River Deben around three miles south of Framlingham and is the former estate village of Easton Park, one-time seat of the Duke of Hamilton. The population of the parish at the 2011 Census was 331.

William Douglas-Hamilton, 12th Duke of Hamilton, died without male issue in 1895 and the title passed to his fourth cousin, who became Alfred Douglas-Hamilton, 13th Duke of Hamilton. Although the Dukedom and estates had passed, a large share of the Hamilton lands and properties, including Easton park, went to Lady Mary, the 12th Duke and Duchess's only child.

After World War I, the British government imposed colossal taxes on the rich to help defray the cost of the war. Faced with these taxes and with the cost of restoring Easton Park from it use as a Red Cross Hospital during the war, the late-12th Duke's daughter the Duchess of Montrose and her husband James Graham, 6th Duke of Montrose, decided to sell the estate.

The land was divided into 137 lots and sold by auction in 1919. The sale attracted a great deal of attention and raised £58,000 (£4.6 million today) but Easton park itself (often referred to as 'the Mansion') and its 150-acre parkland remained unsold. It was sold privately for £11,278 (£900,000 today) and the parkland was transferred to Martley Hall. With very little land the Mansion's fate was sealed and in December 1924 demolition began. Some of the artifacts were removed and incorporated into Martley Hall and other local houses.

Easton is still home to the pack of hunting hounds established by the 12th Duke in the 19th century. The pack of harriers was established and funded entirely by the duke, much to the delight of the local landowners and farmers. Following his death in 1895, the committee received the Dowager Duchess's permission to name the pack the 'Hamilton Hounds' in his memory. Since the succession of the 13th Duke and the consequent split of Easton away from the Hamilton estate, the connection between the family and the hunt has waned. The hunt is now called the Easton Harriers and is still an integral part of the village, and shows good sport in the local area.

Easton is also the home of Easton Farm Park, a farming museum with a selection of rare breeds and depicting other countryside related activities.
