= Zuylestein Castle =

- Huis Zuylestein
- Utrecht, the Netherlands
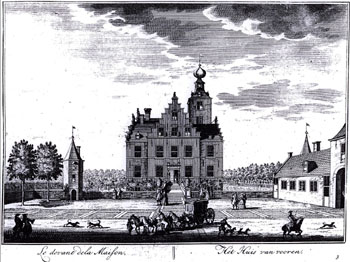
- Zuylestein Castle

Site information
- Type: Castle

Location
- The Netherlands
- Coordinates: 52°0′3″N 5°26′33″E

Zuylestein Castle (Dutch Huis Zuylenstein; also spelt Zuylestein or Zuilenstein) is a castle near the town of Leersum in the Netherlands, some twenty miles east of the city of Utrecht.

The house itself dates to the fourteenth century, but only gained its municipal status in 1536. Originally the property of the burgomaster of Utrecht, the holding passed into the hands of Frederick Henry, then Prince of Orange, in 1630. He ceded the castle and its lands to his illegitimate son, Frederick, together with the title Lord of Zuylestein (in Dutch: Heer van Zuylestein) in 1640. The castle survived the ravages of the European wars that followed, but was severely damaged in the Second World War. In 1982, a new house in semi historical style was built on the spot where the former formal gardens were situated. Since 2011, the walled kitchen garden has been restored, being one of the best examples in the Netherlands of a late 17th century walled garden. The Zuylestein estate, including the gardens is now managed by the Twickel Foundation.

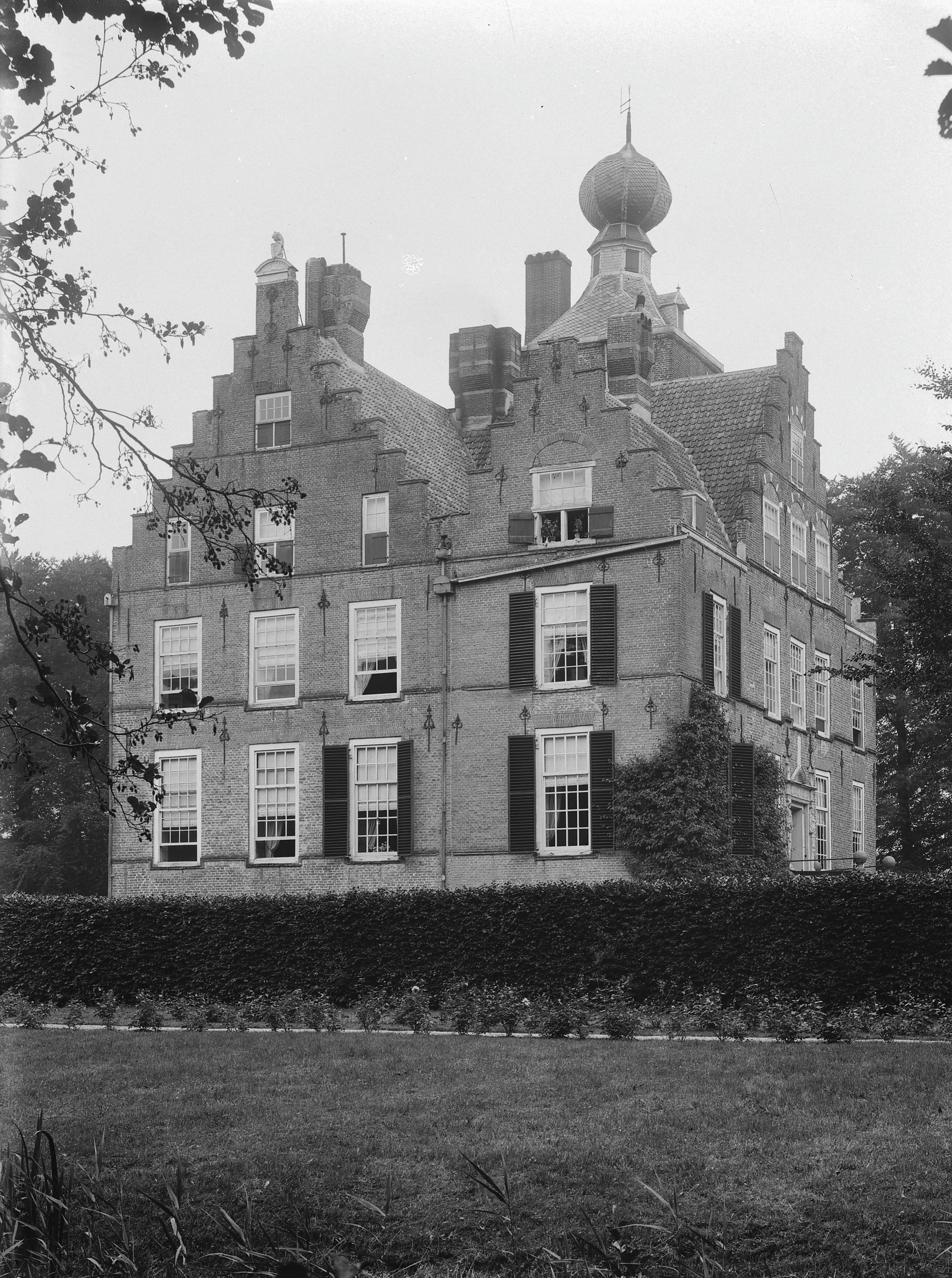
The castle before World War Two

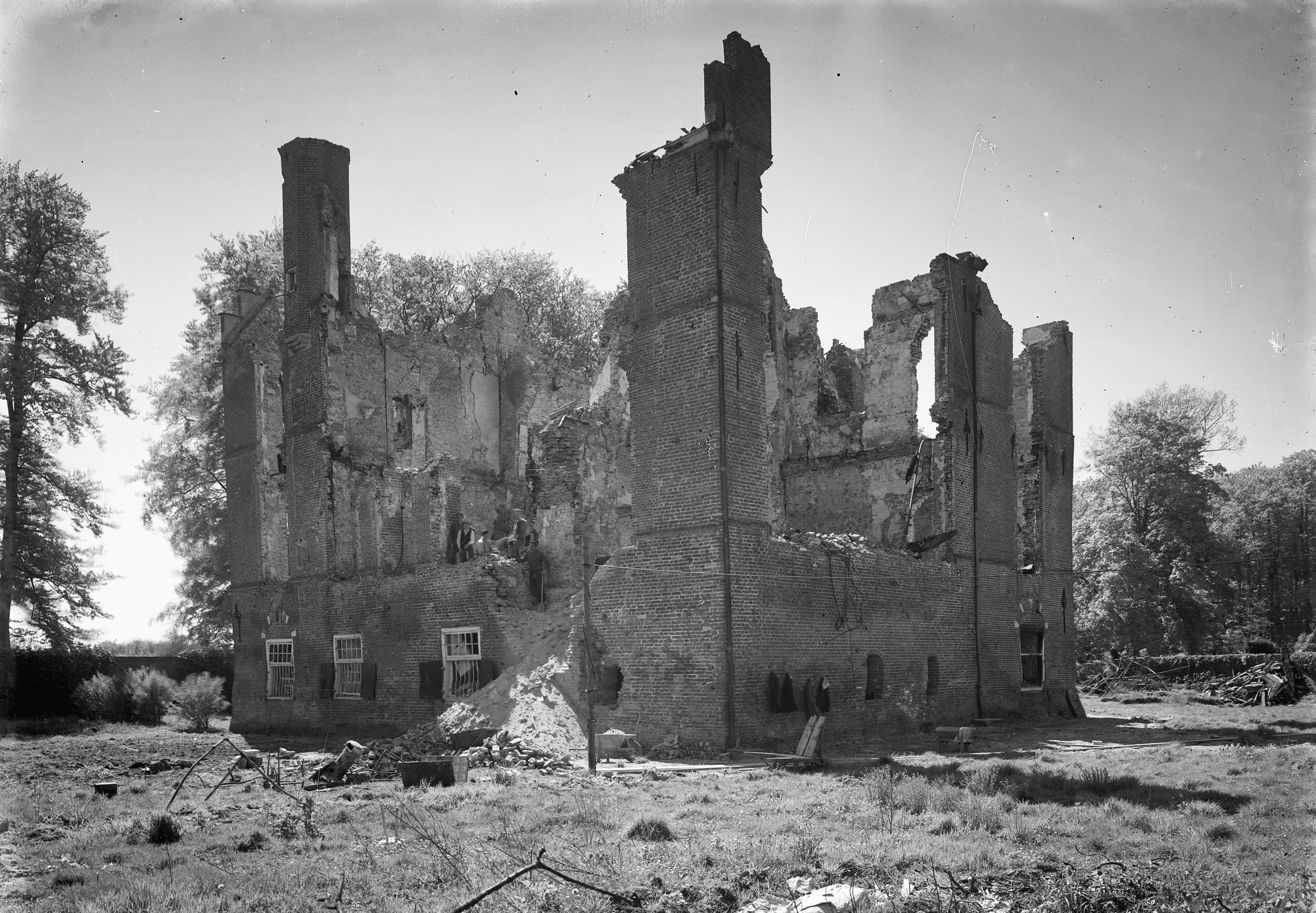
After being bombed
