= Sir Henry Goring, 4th Baronet =

English politician (1679–1731)

Sir Henry Goring, 4th Baronet (baptized 16 September 1679 – 12 November 1731), of Highden, Washington, Sussex, one of the Goring baronets of Highden, was an English politician who had a part in the Jacobite Atterbury Plot of 1721.

== Family and background ==
Goring was born in 1679, fourth son of Captain Henry Goring (died 1685) of Wappingthorne, (in Steyning) Sussex, and his second wife Mary, daughter of Sir John Covert, 1st Baronet, of Slaugham, Sussex. He married in 1714 Elizabeth, daughter of Sir George Matthew, of Twickenham, Middlesex, and by her had nine sons and two daughters. He succeeded his half-brother Charles to the baronetcy and to Wappingthorn estate in Steyning, Sussex in 1714.

== Military and political career ==
Goring was commissioned Captain in Colonel Edmund Soames's regiment of foot in 1705, before transferring in 1707 to a regiment of horse commanded by Samuel Masham, who was a favourite of the then monarch, Queen Anne. In 1711 he became Colonel of the 31st Regiment of Foot before going on half-pay in 1713. As a Jacobite, he was one of a number of British army officers forced to sell their commissions during the time of the Jacobite Rising of 1715.

He was a Member (MP) of the Parliament of Great Britain for Steyning 1 February 1709 – 1715, and for Horsham 4 April 1707 – 1708 and 26 January – 16 June 1715, but was unseated by petition of his opponent.

== Role in Atterbury Plot ==
Goring, who stood (unsuccessfully as turned out) in the 1722 general election as MP for his old seat of Steyning, wrote to the Pretender James Francis Edward Stuart on 20 March 1721 a letter in which he put forward a plan for a restoration of the Stuart monarchy with the assistance of an invasion by Irish exile troops commanded by the Duke of Ormonde from Spain and Lieutenant-General Dillon from France.

The plot collapsed in England in the spring of 1722, at the time of the death of Charles Spencer, 3rd Earl of Sunderland, who a year before had been forced to resign as First Lord of the Treasury. He died on 19 April, when the Duke of Orleans, Regent of France, made it known to Carteret, Robert Walpole's Secretary of State for the Southern Department, that the Jacobites had asked him to send 3,000 men in support of a coup d'état to take place early in May. The French said they had refused permission for the Duke of Ormonde to march a force across France to a channel port and they had also moved their Irish Brigade away from Dunkirk. Sunderland's papers were seized, and a letter of thanks addressed to him by the Pretender came to light.

In England, insufficient money had been collected by the Jacobites to provide enough arms to support a rising, leading the Jacobite exile leader the Earl of Mar (writing in March 1722) to comment on hearing this that Goring, "though a honest, stout, man, had not showed himself very fit for things of this kind".

Walpole's agents began the search for evidence against the leading suspects of Jacobitism, but they found little. Despite this, Walpole gave orders for several men to be arrested including Goring as well as Bishop Atterbury. The latter was imprisoned in the Tower of London. Goring, meanwhile, avoided arrest and fled the country on 23 August; he remained in France until his death in 1731. In his absence, at a trial where he was considered one of the major managers of the plot, his agent stated Goring had attempted to enlist a gang of one thousand brandy smugglers to assist the projected invasion. This led to some government action against such smuggling.

He was created Viscount Goring and Baron Bullinghel in the Jacobite Peerage after going into exile in France in 1722. He died in 1731, still in exile, at age 52.

Peerage of England
New creation	— TITULAR — Viscount Goring; Jacobite peerage 1722–1731	Succeeded by Charles Matthew Goring
Baronetage of England
Preceded by Charles Goring	Baronet (of Highden); 1714–1731	Succeeded by Charles Matthew Goring
