= Maria Coventry, Countess of Coventry =

English beauty and society hostess (1732–1760)

Maria Coventry Countess of Coventry
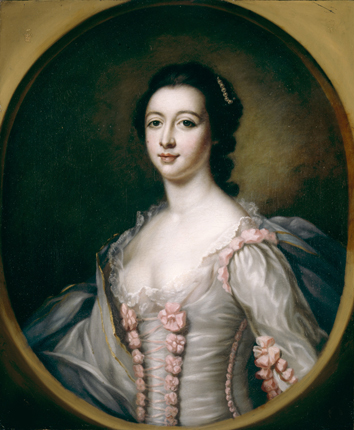
- The Countess of Coventry by Francis Cotes 1751
- Born: Maria Gunning; 15 August 1732
- Died: 30 September 1760 (aged 28)
- Spouse: George Coventry, 6th Earl of Coventry (m. 1752)
- Children: Lady Anne Margaret Coventry; Lady Mary Alicia Coventry; George Coventry, 7th Earl of Coventry
- Parents: Colonel John Barnaby Gunning (1703-1767) (father); Hon. Bridget Bourke (1716-1770) (mother)

Maria Coventry, Countess of Coventry (née Gunning; 15 August 1732 – 30 September 1760) was an Irish beauty and London society hostess during the reign of King George II. She died at a young age due to lead poisoning from her cosmetics.

== Biography ==
Portrait of a pensive woman on a sofa, traditionally identified as Maria Gunning, pastel by Jean-Étienne Liotard (Metropolitan Museum of Art, 2019.141.16)

Maria was born in Hemingford Grey, Huntingdonshire, England and was the eldest child of John Gunning of Castle Coote in County Roscommon, Ireland, and his wife Hon. Bridget Bourke, daughter of Theobald Bourke, 6th Viscount Mayo (1681–1741). Maria's younger siblings were Elizabeth, Catherine (married Robert Travis, died 1773), Sophia, Lizzie and John (a general in the army).

In 1740 the Gunning family returned to Ireland, where they divided their time between their ancestral home in Roscommon, which John Gunning inherited that year from his brother, and a rented house in Dublin. According to some sources, when Maria and her sister Elizabeth came of age, their mother urged them to take up acting in order to earn a living, owing to the family's relative poverty. The sources further state that the Gunning sisters worked for some time in the Dublin theatres, befriending actors like Peg Woffington, even though acting was not considered a respectable profession, as many actresses doubled as courtesans to wealthy benefactors. However, other sources deny this and point out that Margaret Woffington did not arrive in Dublin until May 1751, by which time Maria and her sister Elizabeth were in England.

In October 1748, a ball was held at Dublin Castle by the Viscountess Petersham. The two sisters did not have suitable attire to attend such an occasion until Thomas Sheridan, the manager of one of the local theatres, supplied them with two costumes from the green room—those of Lady Macbeth and Juliet. Wearing the costumes, they were presented to the Earl of Harrington, the then Lord Lieutenant of Ireland. Harrington must have been pleased by the meeting as, by 1750, Bridget Gunning had persuaded him to grant her a pension, which she then used to transport herself, Maria and Elizabeth back to their original home in Huntingdon, England. With their attendance at local balls and parties, the beauty of the two girls was much remarked upon. They became well-known celebrities, their fame reaching all the way to London.

It is said that when they arrived in London a practical joker gave the Gunning sisters a forged invitation to a ball given by the Duchess of Bedford. When the fraud was discovered, either their mother or a friend prevailed upon the Duchess to issue a genuine invitation and she obliged, perhaps having heard how lovely the sisters were.

On 2 December 1750, they were presented at the court of St James, at which time they were sufficiently famous that the presentation was noted in the London newspapers. Horace Walpole wrote:

The two Miss Gunnings [...] are twenty times more the subject of conversation than the two brothers [Newcastle and Pelham] and Lord Granville. These are two Irish girls, of no fortune, who are declared the handsomest women alive. I think their being two so handsome and both such perfect figures is their chief excellence.

Within a year, Elizabeth had married the Duke of Hamilton. In March 1752, Maria married the 6th Earl of Coventry and became the Countess of Coventry. In June 1752, Lord Coventry and his new wife set out for France on their honeymoon. Lord Downe met them at Calais and offered Lady Coventry a tent bed so that she need not suffer bed bugs at the inns on her journey. She flatly refused, claiming she would rather 'be bit to death, than lie one night from my dear Cov'. But in Paris tempers began to fray, culminating in Maria’s refusal to attend a party hosted by Madame de Pompadour because it was her ‘dancing master’s hour’.

Maria, who was notoriously tactless, was reported to have made a notable gaffe by telling the elderly George II that the one thing she would most like to see was a royal coronation (something impossible whilst he lived). Luckily the aged King understood this came out of Maria's naivety and repeated the story himself with much good-humour (as quoted by Horace Walpole in March 1756).

Maria's husband, the 6th Earl of Coventry, had an infamous dalliance with the courtesan Kitty Fisher. When Kitty heard that Maria's seamstress had designed a gorgeous riding habit especially for Maria, she persuaded the Earl to have an identical one made for her. In the summer of 1759, the two ladies went riding the same day in St James's Park. Giustiniana Wynne, an Anglo-Venetian writer and friend of Casanova, reported the encounter some years later:

The other day they ran into each other in the park and Lady Coventry asked Kitty the name of the dressmaker who had made her dress. Kitty Fisher answered she had better "ask Lord Coventry as he had given her the dress as a gift." The altercation continued with Lady Coventry calling her an impertinent woman, and Kitty replying that she would have to accept this insult because Maria became her "social superior" on marrying Lord Coventry, but she was going to marry a Lord herself just to be able to answer back.

Staffordshire enamel snuffbox printed with Lady Coventry's Minuet (circa 1760-65).

Maria was rumoured to have had a dalliance with the 3rd Duke of Grafton, but this was never confirmed beyond doubt. Likewise, her name has been linked with that of Frederick St John, 2nd Viscount Bolingbroke.

Maria's portrait was widely reproduced in her lifetime (along with that of her sister). A piece of music 'Lady Coventry's Minuet' was written in her honour and was also widely reproduced (it was first published in London in 'the Compleat Tutor for the German Flute' by Joseph Hill).

== Cosmetics and Death ==
Maria (née Gunning), Countess of Coventry by James Macardell, after Gavin Hamilton mezzotint, published 1753, National Portrait Gallery, London

Lord Coventry forbade Maria from wearing cosmetics; in 1752 he and the 20-year-old Maria were in Paris for their honeymoon and had a public fight about her excessive use of rouge:

Poor Lady Coventry was [...] very silly, ignorant of the world, breeding, speaking no French, and suffered to wear neither rouge nor powder, she had that perpetual drawback upon her beauty. [Lord Coventry] is jealous, prude, and scrupulous; at a dinner at Sir John Eland's, before sixteen persons, he coursed his wife round the table, on suspecting she had stolen on a little rouge, seized her, scrubbed it off by force with a napkin, and then told her, that since she had deceived him and broke her promise, he would carry her back directly to England.

Maria persisted and it led to her early death (at the age of 28) on 30 September 1760 'killed ... by white lead of which nothing could break her'. Throughout the 17th and 18th centuries, it was fashionable for women to whiten their skin with a lead-based makeup, Venetian ceruse, and paint on red rouged cheeks. The noxious effects of lead caused skin eruptions, which then encouraged women to apply more ceruse to cover the blemishes, eventually causing poisoning. The blue-stocking Mary Delany wrote shortly before Maria's death:

What a wretched end Lady Coventry makes after her short-lived reign of beauty. Not contented with the extraordinary share Providence has bestowed upon her, she presumptuously and vainly thought to mend it, and by that means, they say, has destroyed her life, for Doctor Taylor says the white she made use of for her neck and face was rank poison.

Horace Walpole wrote of her tragic end in a letter to Sir Horace Mann on 1st November 1760:

Lady Coventry concluded her short race with the same attention to her looks. She lay constantly on a couch, with a pocket-glass in her hand; and when that told her how great the change was, she took to her bed the last fortnight, had no light in her room but the lamp of a tea-kettle, and at last took things in through the curtains of her bed, without suffering them to be undrawn. The mob, who never quitted curiosity about her, went, to the number of ten thousand, only to see her coffin.

Many nineteenth and early twentieth century publications suggest that Maria died of consumption (tuberculosis) and cite the fact that at least one of her siblings died of the same disease in support of the proposition.

Originally known simply as a beauty, Maria eventually became known as a tragic victim of vanity, insecurity and the cosmetics business.

== Portraits of Maria Gunning ==
Maria and Elizabeth Gunning, 'The Hibernian Sisters', mezzotint, circa 1752 published J. Okey, London

Maria Gunning, Countess of Coventry, mezzotint after Francis Cotes (Scottish National Gallery )

Maria Gunning, Countess of Coventry, Battersea enamel after Francis Cotes (Scottish National Gallery )

Maria Gunning, Chinese export reverse glass painting circa 1750 (with Anthony James & Son Ltd )

Maria Gunning, Countess of Coventry, mezzotint by Richard Houston after Jean-Etienne Liotard (Scottish National Gallery )

Maria Gunning after Liotard, Battersea Enamel, 1753-6 (Private Collection )

The Celebrated Miss Gunning (Maria Countess of Coventry) published by Samuel Okey c 1748 (British Museum )

Portrait of Maria Gunning, 'The Fair Hibernian', 1751, by Francis Patton published by Elizabeth Griffin (British Museum )

Maria Coventry, watchpaper engraved by John June after Francis Cotes, circa 1775, set into a horn patch box.

Maria Coventry, Countess of Coventry, watchpaper engraved by John June and published Robert Sayer, c 1775 (Grosvenor Prints, London)

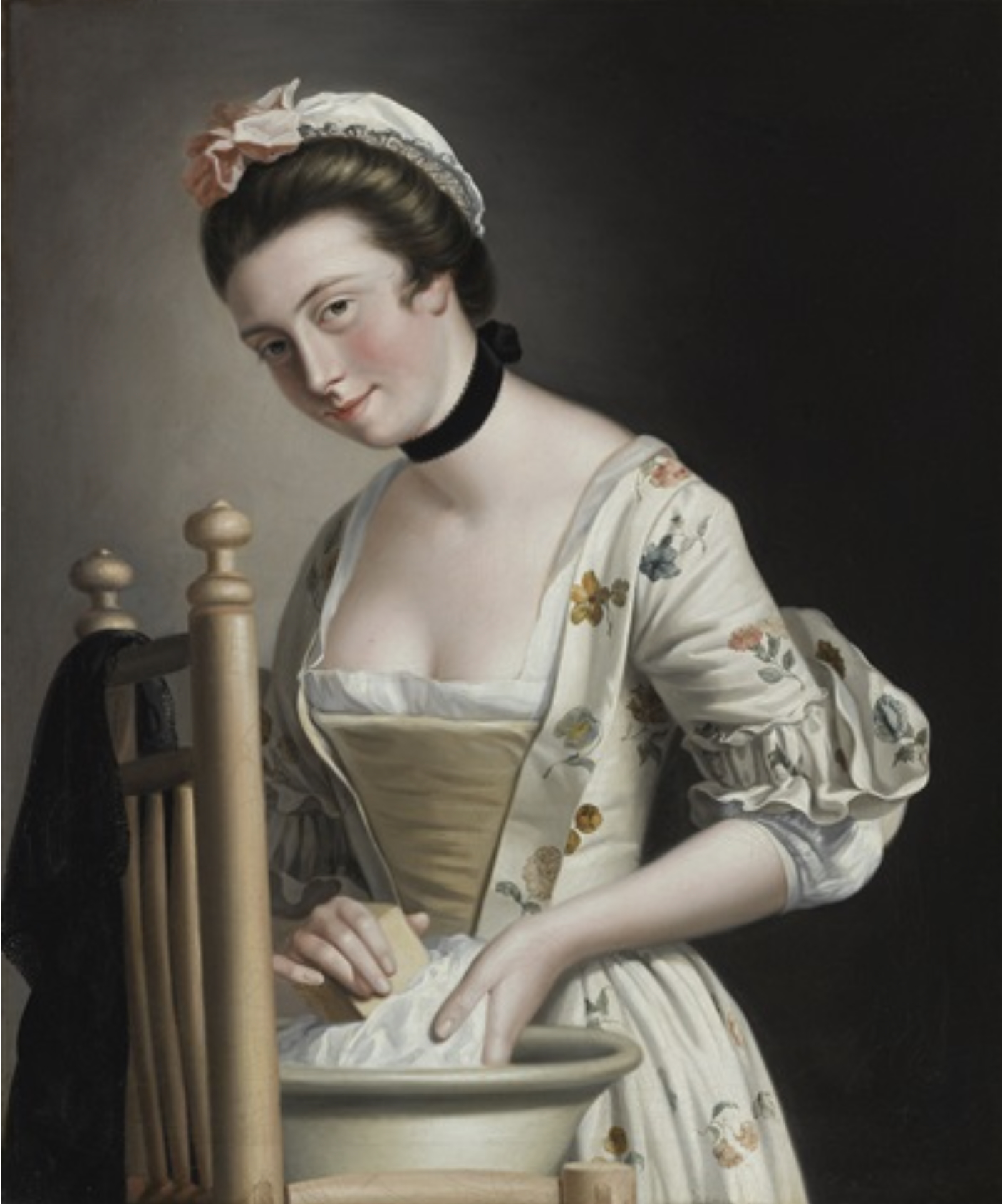
Henry Robert Morland, Domestick Employment traditionally identified as Maria, Countess of Coventry

Chinese export plate decorated with portrait of Maria Coventry based after Francis Cotes, 1751-1760, hard paste porcelain, overglaze enamels, HD. 64.176 - Flynt Center of Early New England Life - Deerfield, Massachusetts

'Gratitude: A Poem' with portraits of Maria, Elizabeth and Kitty Gunning, April 24, 1756
