= Anne Hamilton, Duchess of Hamilton =

Third wife of James Hamilton, 5th Duke of Hamilton

Her Grace The Duchess of Hamilton
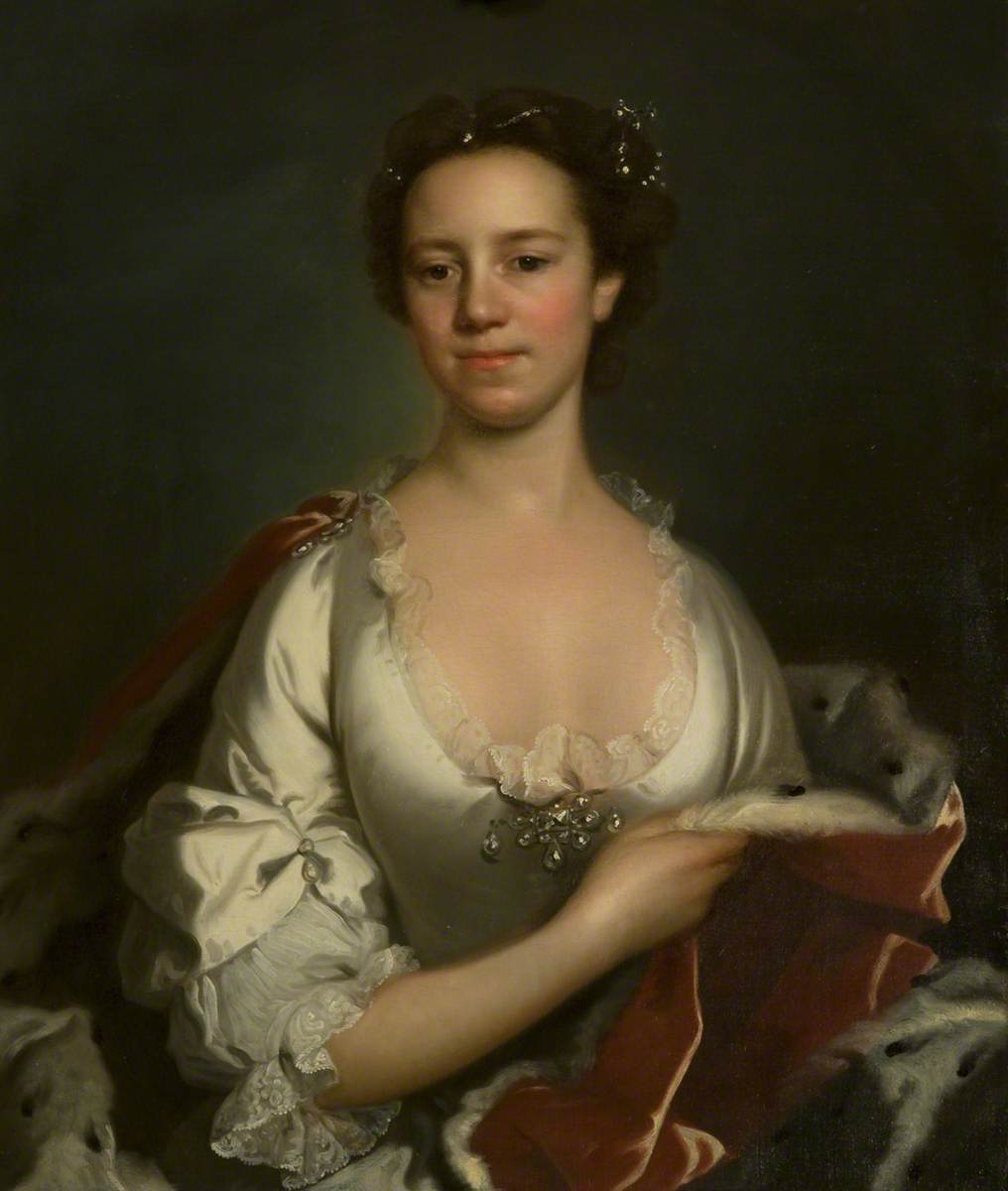
- Born: 1720
- Died: 9 March 1771 (aged 50–51)

Anne Hamilton, Duchess of Hamilton (1720 – 9 March 1771) formerly Anne Spencer, was the third wife of James Hamilton, 5th Duke of Hamilton.

== Life ==
She was the daughter of Edward Spencer of Rendlesham, Suffolk, where she was born. Thus she was the sister of Elizabeth Spencer, later the wife of Sir James Dashwood, 2nd Baronet, and the aunt of the future Anne Stewart, Countess of Galloway and Elizabeth, Duchess of Manchester.

His second wife having died in 1729, the duke married Anne Spencer on 21 August 1737. They had three children:

- Lady Anne Hamilton (1738–1780), who married Arthur Chichester, 1st Marquess of Donegall, and had children
- Archibald Hamilton, 9th Duke of Hamilton (1740–1819)
- Lord Spencer Hamilton (1742–1789) who died unmarried in Paris (alternatively, Lord Spencer Hamilton actually married to a Charlotte Spencer and had a son, Spencer Hamilton and a daughter Anne Elizabeth Hamilton, who was married to Philip Wynter). An alternative death date of 1791 is also recorded.

The duke died in 1743, aged 40, and was initially succeeded by James, his 21-year-old son from his first marriage. The duchess remarried on 24 December 1751, her second husband being Richard Savage Nassau, a son of Frederick Nassau de Zuylestein, 3rd Earl of Rochford. She retained the status of dowager duchess.

They had three children:

- Lucy Nassau de Zuylestein (1752–1830), who died unmarried
- William Henry Nassau de Zuylestein, 5th Earl of Rochford (1754–1830), who died unmarried
- George Richard Savage Nassau (1756–1823), who died unmarried

The duchess died in 1771 and was buried at Easton, Suffolk, under the terms of her will. The Spencer family estates passed to her elder son, Archibald, who later inherited the dukedom from the son of his half-brother.
