= Elizabeth Hamilton, 1st Baroness Hamilton of Hameldon =

British noblewoman (died 1790)

Her Grace The Duchess of Argyll
- Elizabeth Gunning, 1st Baroness Hamilton of Hameldon, pastel by Francis Cotes, signed and dated 1751, NPG, London (NPG 4890)
- Born: December 1733; Hemingford Grey, Huntingdonshire
- Died: 20 December 1790 (aged 56–57); Argyll House, Argyll Street, Westminster
- Buried: Kilmun, Argyllshire
- Spouses: James Hamilton, 6th Duke of Hamilton (m. 1752; died 1758) John Campbell, 5th Duke of Argyll (m. 1759)
- Issue: Elizabeth Smith-Stanley, Countess of Derby; James Douglas-Hamilton, 7th Duke of Hamilton; Douglas Douglas-Hamilton, 8th Duke of Hamilton; Lady Augusta Campbell; George John Campbell, Earl of Campbell; George Campbell, 6th Duke of Argyll; Lady Charlotte Campbell; John Campbell, 7th Duke of Argyll
- Father: John Gunning
- Mother: Hon. Bridget Bourke

Elizabeth Campbell, Duchess of Argyll, 1st Baroness Hamilton of Hameldon (c. December 1733 – 20 December 1790), earlier Elizabeth Hamilton, Duchess of Hamilton, née Gunning, was a celebrated Anglo-Irish beauty, lady-in-waiting to Queen Charlotte, and society hostess.

== Early life ==
Born in Hemingford Grey, Huntingdonshire, Elizabeth Gunning was one of the daughters of John Gunning of Castle Coote, County Roscommon, and his wife, Bridget Bourke, a daughter of Theobald Bourke, 6th Viscount Mayo (1681–1741). Elizabeth's sisters were Maria Gunning, later Countess of Coventry and Kitty Gunning, both of whom moved to London and were collectively known as the Gunning Sisters

In late 1740 or early 1741, the Gunning family returned from England to John Gunning's ancestral home in Ireland, where they divided their time between their country house in Roscommon and a rented town house in Dublin. According to some sources, when Maria and her sister Elizabeth came of age, their mother urged them to take up acting, in order to earn a living, owing to the family's relative poverty, even though acting was not considered a respectable profession, as many actresses of that time doubled as courtesans; and that the Gunning sisters worked for some time in the Dublin theatres, befriending actors who included Margaret Woffington. However, Woffington did not arrive in Dublin until May 1751, by which time Maria and her sister Elizabeth were in England.

In October 1748, a ball was held at Dublin Castle by Viscountess Petersham. The two sisters did not have any dresses for the gathering until Thomas Sheridan, manager of one of the local theatres, supplied them with two costumes from the green room, those of Lady Macbeth and Juliet. Wearing the costumes, they were presented to the Earl of Harrington, the then Lord Lieutenant of Ireland. Harrington must have been pleased by the meeting as, by 1750, Bridget Gunning had persuaded him to grant her a pension, which she then used to transport herself, Maria, and Elizabeth, back to their original home in Huntingdon, England. With their attendance at local balls and parties, the beauty of the two girls was much remarked upon. They became well-known celebrities, their fame reaching all the way to London, with themselves following soon afterwards. On 2 December 1750, they were presented at the Court of St James's. By this time, they were sufficiently famous that the presentation was noted in the London newspapers.

Elizabeth was immortalized in portraits by, among others, artists Joshua Reynolds and Gavin Hamilton.

== Marriages ==
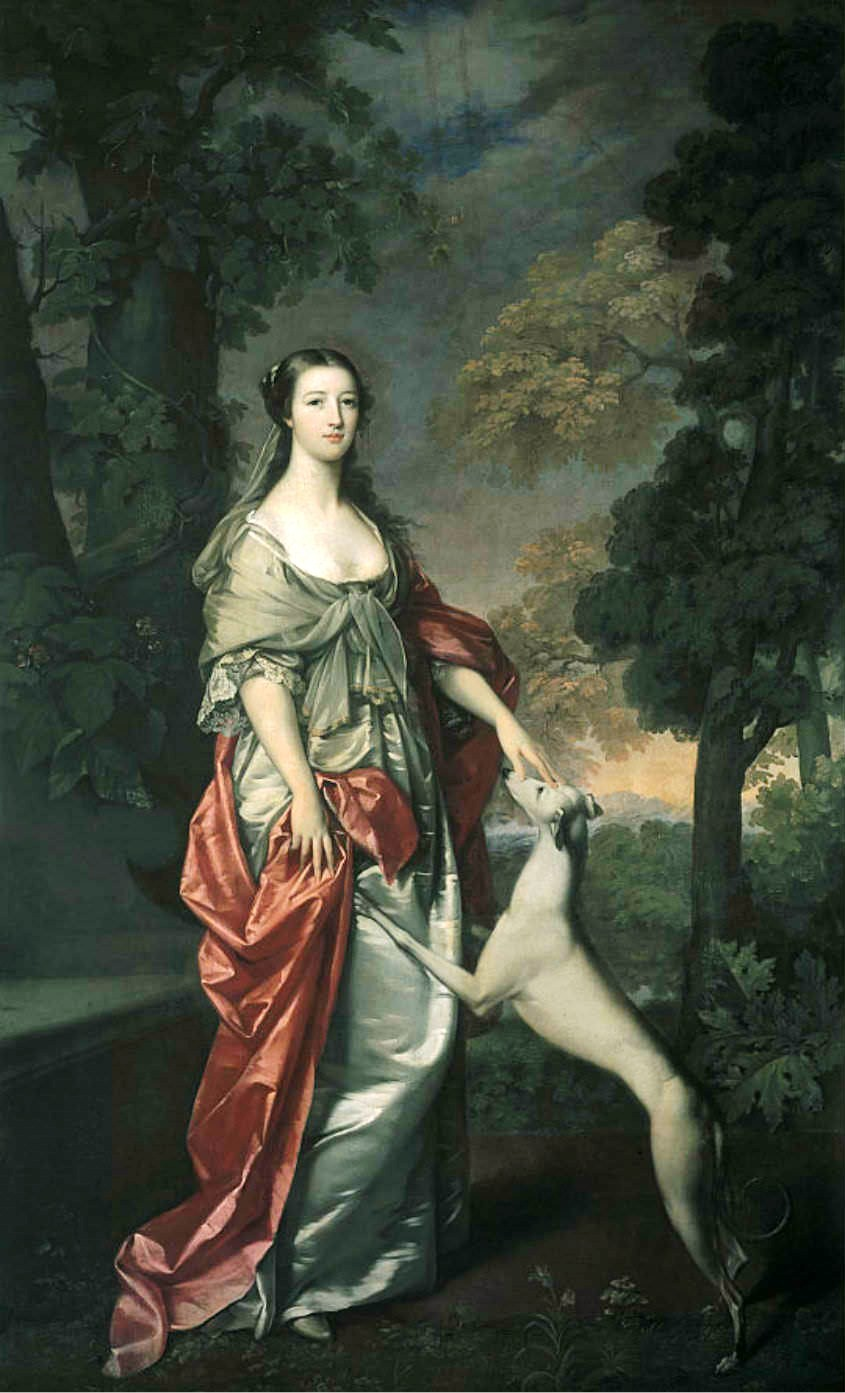
Portrait by Gavin Hamilton

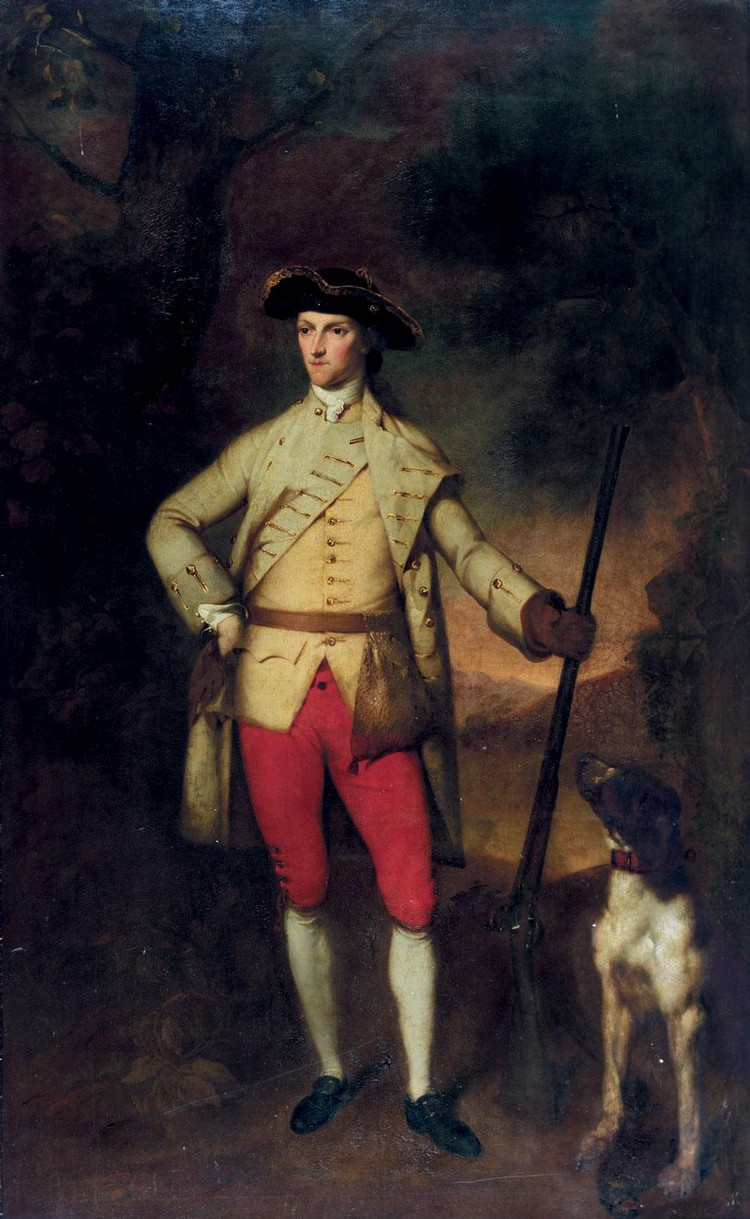
James Hamilton, 6th Duke of Hamilton

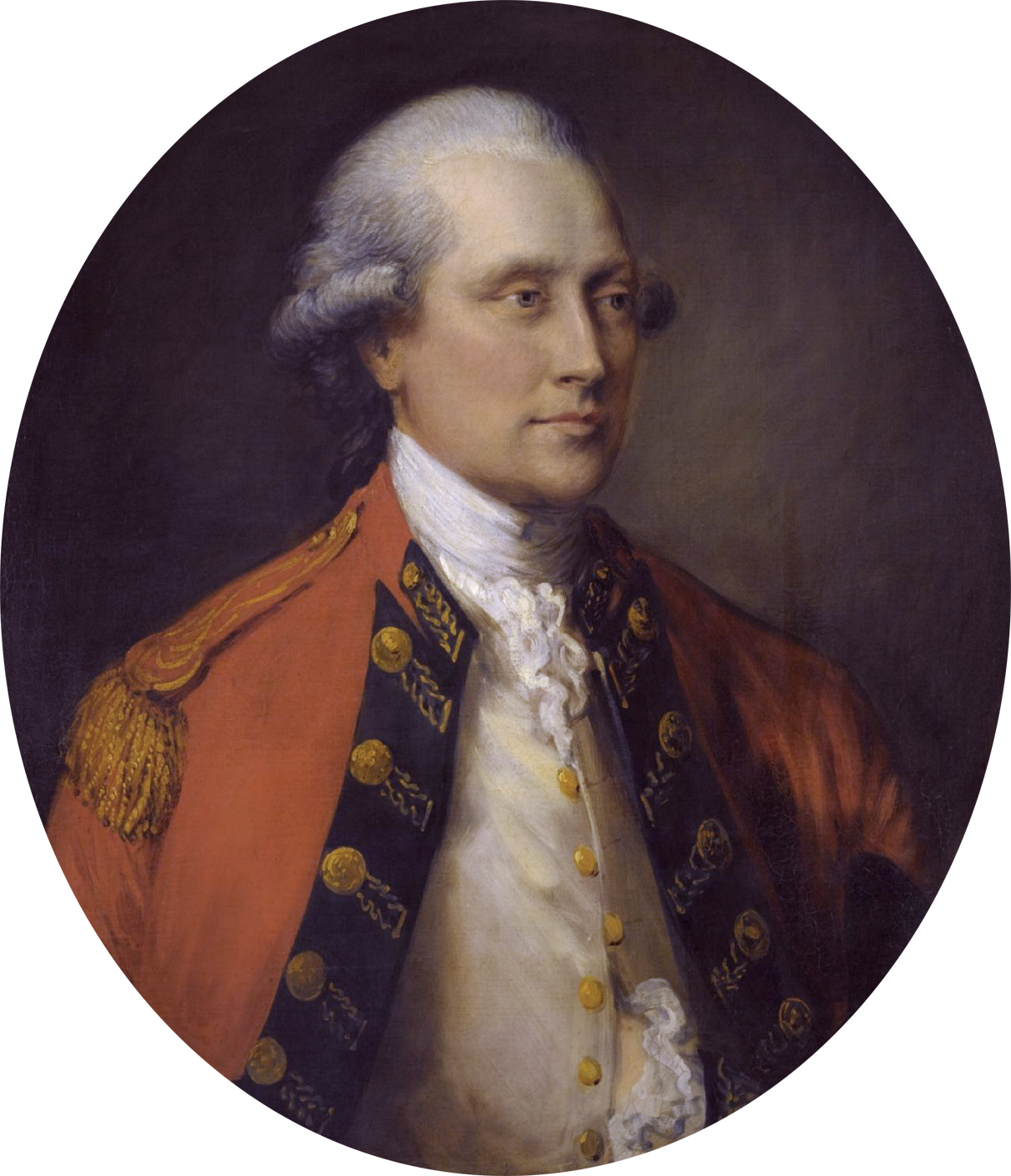
John Campbell, Duke of Argyll

In January or February 1752, Elizabeth met the young James Hamilton, 6th Duke of Hamilton (1724–1758). According to Horace Walpole, it was on 14 February (Valentine's Day) at a party at Bedford House, and the duke declared his wish to marry Elizabeth that night and called for a local clergyman to perform the ceremony. However, without a licence, calling of banns, or a ring, the clergyman refused. They were eventually married that night in May Fair Chapel, which did not require a licence, with a ring from a bed-curtain, whereupon Elizabeth became the duchess of Hamilton.

Walpole said of the couple: "Duke Hamilton is the abstract of Scotch pride: he and the Duchess at their own house walk in to dinner before their company, sit together at the upper end of their own table, eat off the same plate, and drink to nobody beneath the rank of Earl—would not one wonder how they could get any body either above or below that rank to dine with them at all?".

Soon after the duke died on 17 January 1758, aged only 33, Elizabeth became engaged to Francis Egerton, 3rd Duke of Bridgewater, but the engagement was cancelled that year for reasons unknown. On 3 February the following year she married John Campbell, Marquess of Lorne, son and heir of the Duke of Argyll.

Enamel plaque depicting Elizabeth Gunning, Battersea Enamel Works, circa 1751, Victoria and Albert Museum

From 1761 to 1784, she was a lady of the bedchamber to Queen Charlotte. She, alongside the Duchess of Ancaster and Elizabeth Howard, Countess of Effingham, were the first three ladies-in-waiting to be appointed to the new queen upon the royal wedding in 1761, and attended to her when she travelled and arrived to England, and during her wedding and coronation. Despite the longevity of her appointment as lady of the bedchamber, Elizabeth had a fractious relationship with the queen. In a letter to her husband, Queen Charlotte insisted that she would not receive Elizabeth's eldest daughter at court, as she had stood trial for adultery. Aware that Elizabeth may quit her post on these grounds, the queen was undaunted: "If she leaves my family, I shall but get rid of an impertinent person who has always behaved disrespectful [sic] to me."

Her husband succeeded to his father's title of duke of Argyll in 1770, and Elizabeth became known as the duchess of Argyll. On 20 May 1776, King George III, a long time admirer of hers, created her Baroness Hamilton of Hameldon in her own right.

=== Children ===
Elizabeth had three children from her first marriage to the Duke of Hamilton:

- Lady Elizabeth Hamilton (26 January 1753 – 14 March 1797), married Edward Smith-Stanley, 12th Earl of Derby
- James Hamilton, 7th Duke of Hamilton (18 February 1755 – 7 July 1769)
- Douglas Hamilton, 8th Duke of Hamilton (24 July 1756 – 2 August 1799)

Elizabeth had five children from her second marriage, with the Duke of Argyll:

- Lady Augusta Campbell
- George John Campbell, Earl of Campbell (1763–1764)
- George Campbell, 6th Duke of Argyll (1768–1839)
- Lady Charlotte Campbell (1775–1861), married firstly Colonel John Campbell and secondly Rev. Edward John Bury
- John Campbell, 7th Duke of Argyll (1777–1847)

== Later life ==
Elizabeth died on 20 December 1790 at her home of Argyll House in London and was buried at Kilmun Parish Church in Kilmun, Argyllshire

== Portraits of Elizabeth Hamilton ==
Elizabeth (née Gunning), Baroness Hamilton of Hameldon by John Finlayson, after Katharine Read mezzotint, published 1770 (National Portrait Gallery, London )

Elizabeth Gunning, Chinese export reverse glass painting circa 1750 (with Anthony James & Son )

Maria and Elizabeth Gunning, 'The Hibernian Sisters', mezzotint, circa 1752 published J. Okey, London

'Gratitude: A Poem' with portraits of Maria, Elizabeth and Kitty Gunning, April 24, 1756

== Honours ==
- (Kingdom of Great Britain) Lady of the Bedchamber, 1761–1784

Arms of Elizabeth Baroness Hamilton of Hameldon

As Baroness Hamilton of Hameldon, Elizabeth received a grant of arms, blazoned: Gules, on a fess ermine, between three doves argent ducally crowned or, as many crosses pattée, of the first, which incorporate elements of the arms of her own Gunning family.

Peerage of Great Britain
New creation	Baroness Hamilton of Hameldon; 1776–1790	Succeeded by Douglas Douglas-Hamilton
