= Kitty Gunning =

Anglo-Irish beauty and courtier (1735–1773)

Catherine ('Kitty') Gunning
- Catherine ('Kitty') Gunning, (1735-1773), later Mrs Robert Travis by Francis Cotes, circa 1751, National Galleries of Scotland (D NG 2294)
- Born: Catherine Gunning; June 12, 1735; Hemingford Grey, Huntingdonshire, England
- Died: 26 May 1773 (aged 37); Westminster
- Spouse: Robert Travis (1747-1825) (m. 1769)
- Children: Elizabeth Dorothea Travis (1770–1774)
- Parents: Colonel John Barnaby Gunning (1703-1767) (father); Hon. Bridget Bourke (1716-1770) (mother)

Catherine ('Kitty') Travis (née Gunning; June 12, 1735 – May 26, 1773) was an Irish beauty, courtier and socialite during the reigns of King George II and King George III. She was one of the famous Gunning Sisters along with her siblings Maria Coventry, Countess of Coventry and Elizabeth Hamilton, 1st Baroness Hamilton of Hameldon.

== Early life ==
Kitty Gunning, mezzotint by Charles Spooner after Francis Cotes (Yale Center for British Art)

Kitty Gunning was born in Hemingford Grey, Huntingdonshire and was baptized June 12, 1735 (many sources suggest she was born in 1740 but the baptismal records belie this). She was one of five children of Captain John Gunning, a barrister of the Middle Temple, and his wife, Bridget Gunning (née Bourke), daughter of Theobald Bourke, 6th Viscount Mayo. In 1740 or 1741 the Gunning family returned to Ireland, where they divided their time between their ancestral home in Roscommon, which John Gunning inherited that year from his brother, and a rented house in Dublin. In 1750, Bridget Gunning moved to England with her eldest daughters Maria and Elizabeth.

It is unclear when Kitty joined her mother and her sisters in England but she was certainly in London by 1755.

== Fame and married life ==
'Gratitude: A Poem' with portraits of Maria, Elizabeth and Kitty Gunning, April 24, 1756

Kitty and her sisters were acclaimed as amongst the greatest beauties in London in their day. Like her siblings, Kitty's portrait was captured by Francis Cotes and was widely reproduced in mezzotint versions. The engraving of her portrait published in 1755 by John Bowles (1701?-1779) was embellished with the following verse:

The youngest of the Graces here we view

So like in beauty to the other Two

Who e’er compares their Features & their Frame

Will know at once that Gunning is her Name

The following year, on April 24, 1756, Kitty's coming of age was celebrated in a broadside Gratitude: A Poem that boasted side-by-side portraits of Maria, Elizabeth, and Kitty Gunning, in a row and of Kitty, the sheet said:

This youngest Grace, so like her Sisters Frame!

Her kindred Features tell from whence she came

'Tis needless once to mention Gunning's name.

"Needless" or not, an asterisk and note helpfully identified those sisters as "Duchess of Hamilton & Countess of Coventry."

Kitty Gunning, watchpaper engraved by Louis Philippe Boitard (fl. 1733–1767)

At around the same time, a song 'Kitty Gunning' was dedicated to her. It was sung at the popular Ranelagh Gardens and was eventually published in the Songster's Magazine in 1770.

Despite favorable comparisons to her sisters, in 1904, Lady Russell wrote of Kitty that although she had a very pretty face, her figure was slightly deformed and she was marked with the smallpox.

On July 10, 1761, Bridget Gunning was given the position of housekeeper of the royal palace of Somerset House - a prestigious and lucrative royal post - that carried an income of £200 per annum and the right to live in Somerset House. Kitty moved in with her mother.

Kitty Gunning, after Francis Cotes by Loftus How (Sheppards, Stradbally, May 26, 2026 )

According to the 19th Century author Frances Gerard, Kitty was still single and living with her mother in 1769 by which time she was thirty-four years-old and 'had reached, according to the prevailing opinion of the day, the very verge of old maidenism'. She met and married Robert Travis (sometimes 'Travers') of All Hallows, Lombard Street, who belonged to a Derbyshire family. He was only twenty-three and had considerable means. They wed in the private chapel in Somerset House on May 6, 1769. They moved briefly to Cork but returned to London in 1770. Following Bridget Gunning's death, Kitty was appointed housekeeper of Somerset House in her place - a post she held until her death.

Kitty's daughter Elizabeth Dorothea Travis was born May 17, 1770 in Somerset House.

Kitty died at Somerset House on May 26, 1773 and was buried with her parents in the St Martin-in-the-Fields in Westminster. Her daughter Elizabeth died the following year in 1774. Her husband died in Cork in February 1826.
