= James Hamilton, 5th Duke of Hamilton =

Scottish peer

His Grace The Duke of Hamilton KT FRS
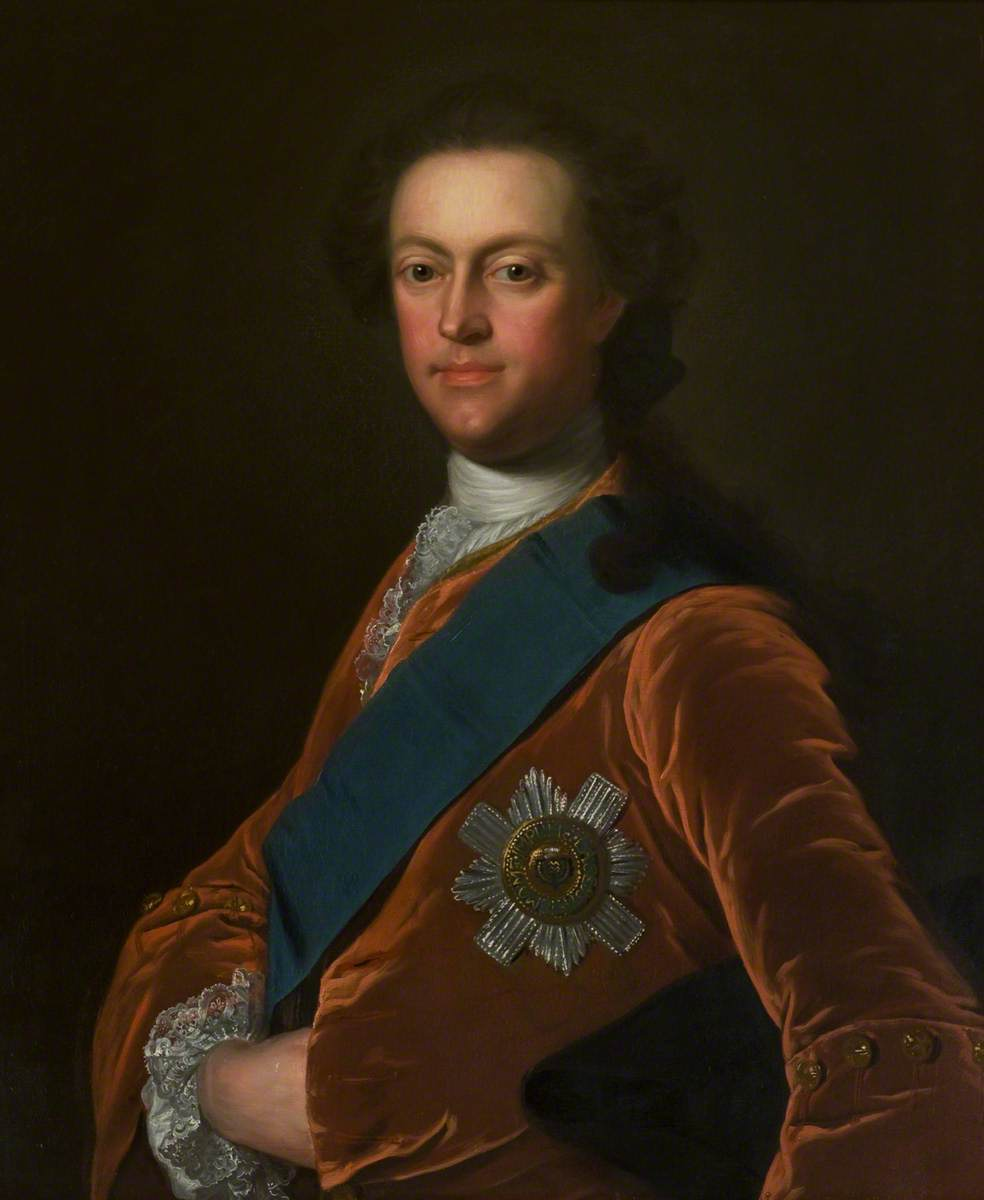
- Portrait by William Hoare
- Tenure: 1712–1743
- Predecessor: James Hamilton, 4th Duke of Hamilton
- Successor: James Hamilton, 6th Duke of Hamilton
- Other titles: 2nd Duke of Brandon
- Born: 5 January 1703
- Died: 2 March 1743 (aged 40); Bath
- Spouses: Lady Anne Cochrane; Elizabeth Strangways; Anne Spencer
- Issue: James Hamilton, 6th Duke of Hamilton; Anne Chichester, Marchioness of Donegall; Archibald Hamilton, 9th Duke of Hamilton; Lord Spencer Hamilton
- Parents: James Hamilton, 4th Duke of Hamilton; Hon. Elizabeth Gerard

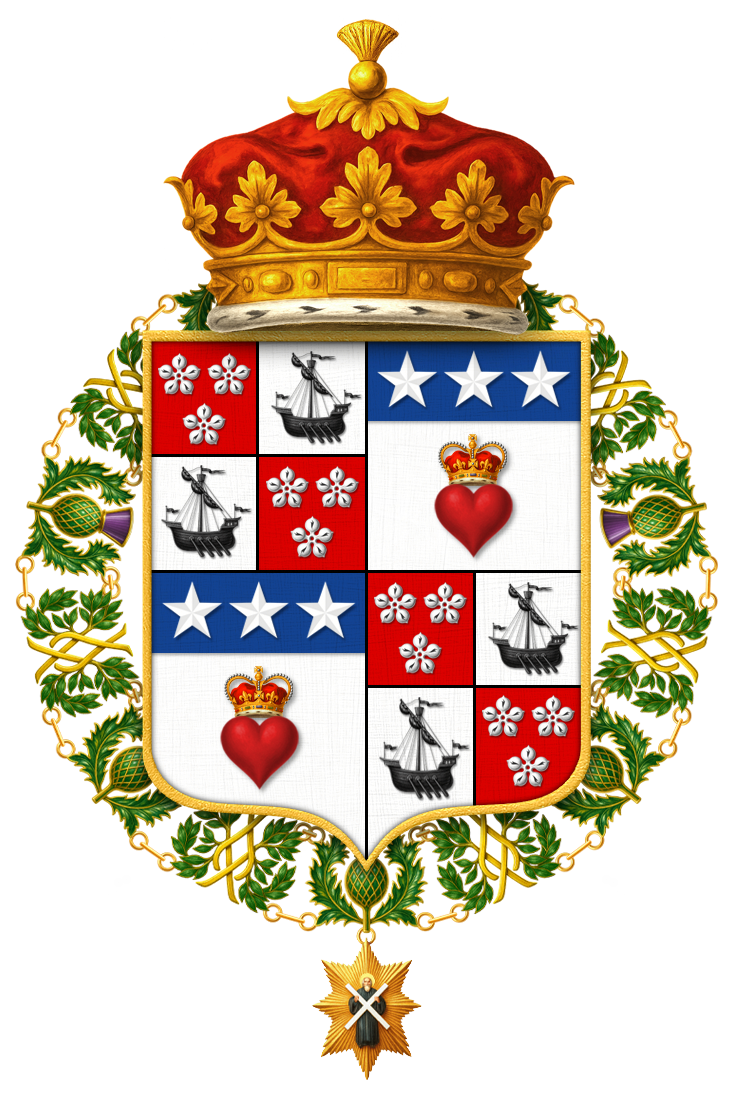
Shield of arms of James Hamilton, 5th Duke of Hamilton and 2nd Duke of Brandon, KG, KT

James Hamilton, 5th Duke of Hamilton and 2nd Duke of Brandon (5 January 1703 – 2 March 1743), was a Scottish peer, the son of the 4th Duke of Hamilton.

Hamilton attended Winchester College from 1716 to 1717. He matriculated at Christ Church, Oxford, on 2 May 1718 and was created a DCL on 6 June 1719. He succeeded to his father's title of Duke of Hamilton in 1712 following his death in the notorious Hamilton–Mohun duel in Hyde Park. At the foundation of the noted charity, the Foundling Hospital in London, Hamilton was one of the charity's first governors and his name is listed on the organisation's royal charter, granted in October 1739.

== Marriages and issue ==
Hamilton married three times. On 14 February 1723 (St. Valentine's Day), he married Lady Anne Cochrane, daughter of the 4th Earl of Dundonald and granddaughter of Charles Murray, 1st Earl of Dunmore. They had one child:

- James (1724–1758), later 6th Duke of Hamilton.

Anne died in childbirth. Hamilton married secondly to Elizabeth Strangways (an aunt of the Countess of Ilchester), but she died childless on 3 November 1729.

On 21 August 1737, Hamilton married for the third time, and the bride was Anne Spencer (an aunt of the Countess of Galloway and the Duchess of Manchester). They had three children together:

- Lady Anne Hamilton (1738 – 11 November 1780), who married Arthur Chichester, 1st Marquess of Donegall. They had three sons.
- Archibald Hamilton, 9th Duke of Hamilton (15 July 1740 – 16 February 1819)
- Lord Spencer Hamilton (1742 – 20 March 1791)

Hamilton died in 1743, aged 40 at Bath from jaundice and palsy. His widow Anne married Richard Savage Nassau and had three more children.

James Hamilton, 5th Duke of Hamilton House of Douglas Born: 5 January 1703 Died: 2 March 1743
Peerage of Scotland
Preceded by James Hamilton	Duke of Hamilton; 1712–1743	Succeeded by James Hamilton
Peerage of Great Britain
Preceded by James Hamilton	Duke of Brandon; 1712–1743	Succeeded by James Hamilton
