= Keith's Chapel =

Coordinates: 51°30′24″N 0°08′50″W

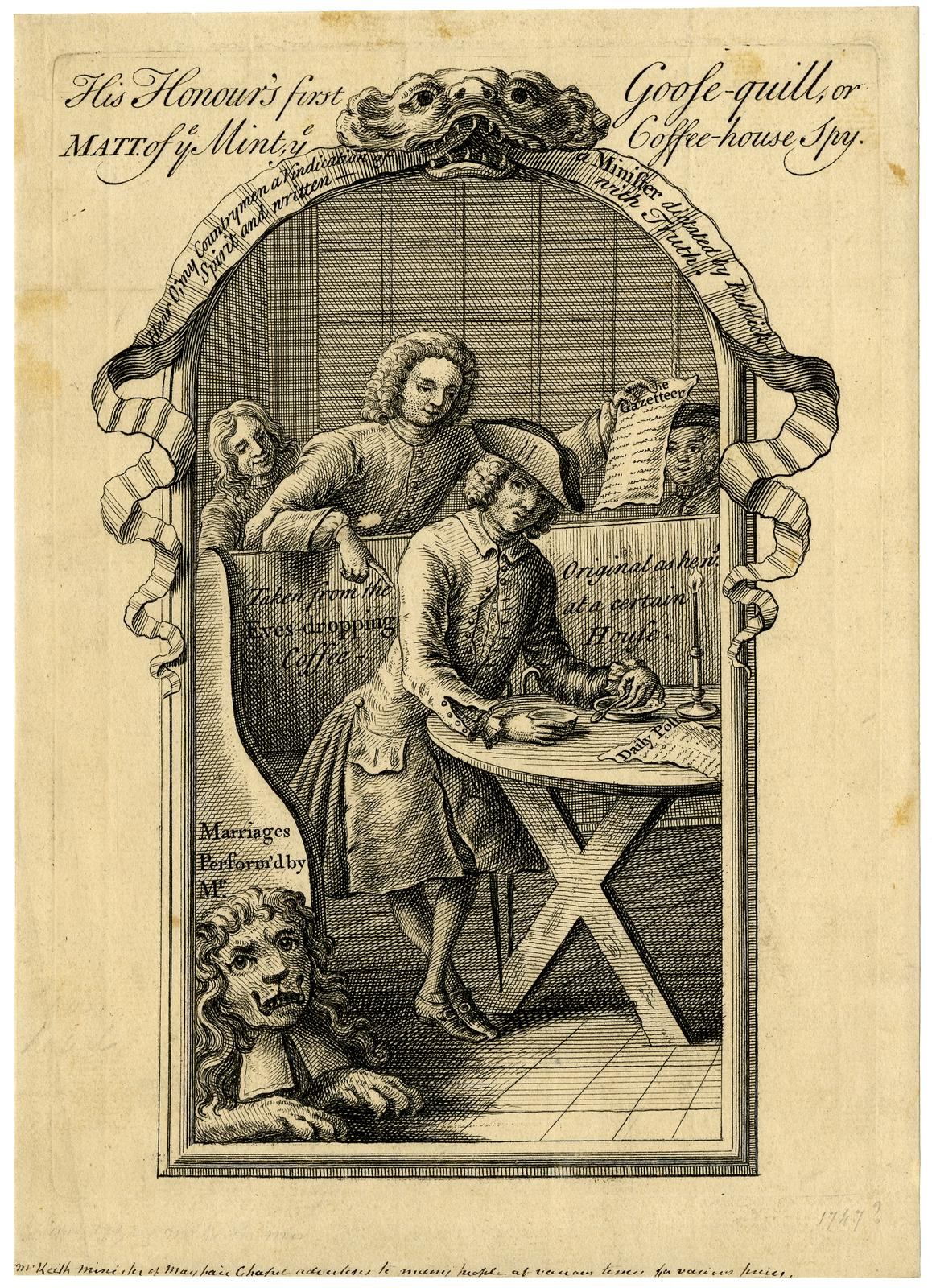
Depiction of Alexander Keith

Keith's Chapel, also known as Mr Keith's Chapel and the May Fair Chapel, was a private chapel in Curzon Street, Mayfair, Westminster, operated by the 18th century Church of England clergyman Alexander Keith.

Keith had been the first incumbent of the Church of England's new Curzon Chapel, built in Curzon Street in 1730, where he began to perform marriages without either banns or license until he was excommunicated by an ecclesiastical court in 1742. Keith then went to prison and remained there for several years. However, he quickly established his own private chapel very near to his old one on Curzon Street, where he and his curates continued clandestine marriages until 1754, when the Marriage Act 1753 came into effect.

The marriages at Keith's Chapel were perfectly lawful, as until 1754 the only indispensable element of a marriage in England was a Church of England clergyman. At its height, some six thousand marriages a year were taking place at the chapel.

The chapel's business was promoted by frequent advertisements in newspapers, such as this one in the Daily Post dated 20 July 1744:

To prevent mistakes, the little new chapel in May Fair, near Hyde Park corner, is in the corner house, opposite to the city side of the great chapel, and within ten yards of it, and the minister and clerk live in the same corner house where the little chapel is; and the licence on a crown stamp, minister and clerk's fees, together with the certificate, amount to one guinea, as heretofore, at any hour till four in the afternoon. And that it may be the better known, there is a porch at the door like a country church porch.

When his wife died in January 1750, Keith combined the announcement of her death in the Daily Advertiser with an advertisement for his chapel's services.

== Notable weddings ==
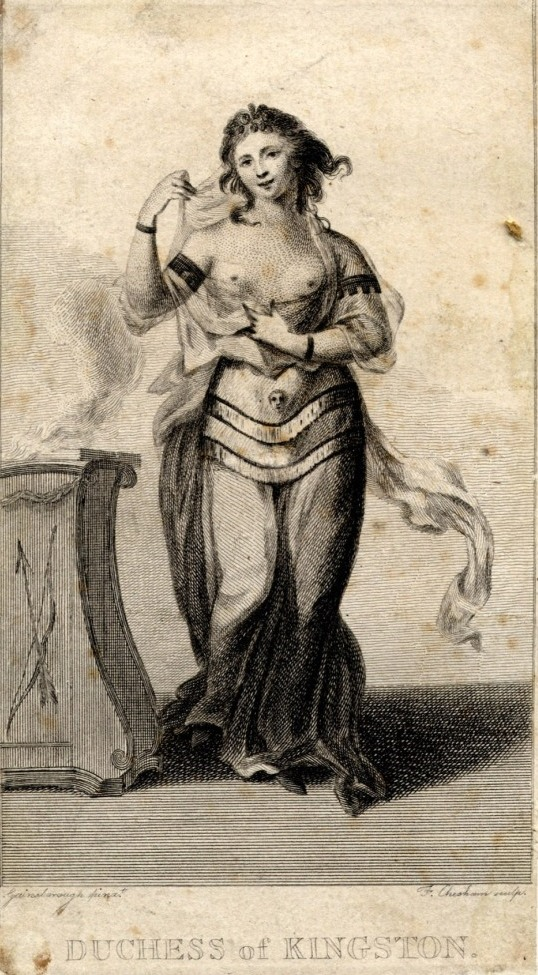
Elizabeth Chudleigh at a ball

The chapel's weddings included

- Duke of Kingston and Elizabeth Chudleigh (bigamously)
- Henry Brydges, 2nd Duke of Chandos and Anne Jeffrey, 1744
- Lord Strange and Lucy Smith, 1746
- Lord Kensington and Rachel Hill, 1749
- Sewellis Shirley and Margaret Rolle, widow of the Earl of Oxford, 1751
- James Hamilton, 6th Duke of Hamilton and Miss Gunning, 1752 (married with a bed-curtain-ring half an hour after midnight)
- Lord George Bentinck and Mary Davies, 1753
