= Elizabeth Smith-Stanley, Countess of Derby =

English peeress (1753–1797)

The Right Honourable The Countess of Derby
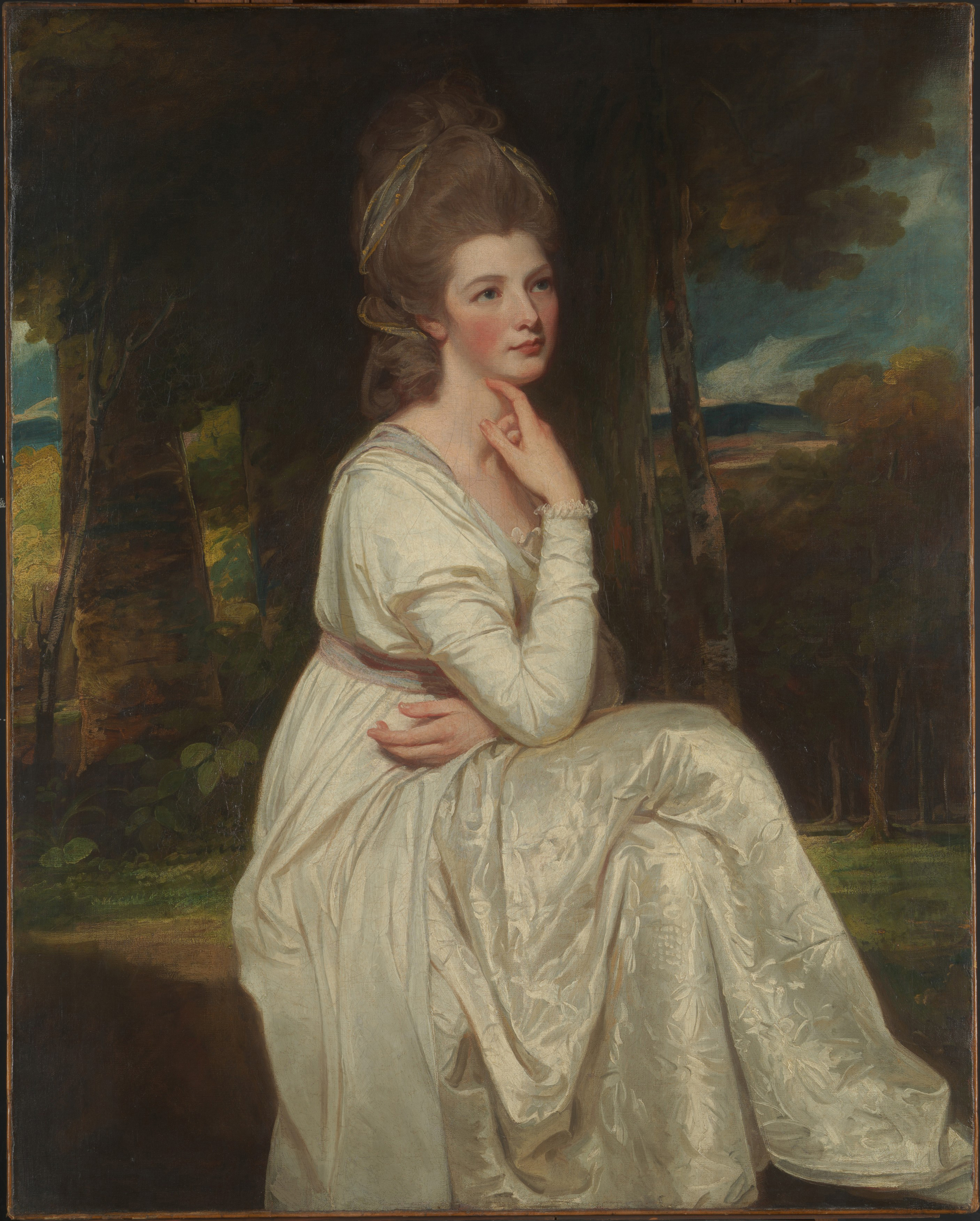
- The Countess of Derby; George Romney, c. 1776–78
- Born: 26 January 1753
- Died: 14 March 1797 (aged 44)
- Spouse: Edward Smith-Stanley, 12th Earl of Derby
- Issue: Edward Smith-Stanley, 13th Earl of Derby; Lady Charlotte Hornby; Lady Elizabeth Henrietta Cole
- Father: James Hamilton, 6th Duke of Hamilton
- Mother: Elizabeth Gunning, 1st Baroness Hamilton of Hameldon

Elizabeth Smith-Stanley, Countess of Derby (née Hamilton; 26 January 1753 – 14 March 1797) was an English peeress. As the eligible eldest daughter of the 6th Duke of Hamilton, she married the 12th Earl of Derby in 1774, giving birth to three children. Lady Derby was popular among society and she organised a ladies cricket match. She was a leader of fashion alongside the Duchess of Devonshire.

Five years after the marriage, Lady Derby embarked in a very public affair with the 3rd Duke of Dorset. She eventually separated from her husband, which caused a scandal and led to her effective exile from society, especially after it was learned that she would not be marrying the Duke. Lady Derby moved abroad, only returning once her husband attracted embarrassing press attention for his very public relationship with the actress Elizabeth Farren, whom he married soon after Lady Derby's death in 1797.

== Family and early life ==
On 26 January 1753, Lady Elizabeth Hamilton was born as the eldest child of James Hamilton, 6th Duke of Hamilton and his wife Elizabeth Gunning. Two younger brothers followed, and her father died in early 1758. The Duchess of Hamilton, considered one of the most beautiful women of the day, remarried in 1759 to John Campbell, Marquess of Lorne (later Duke of Argyll). This marriage gave Lady Elizabeth three younger half-brothers and two younger half-sisters.

== Marriage ==
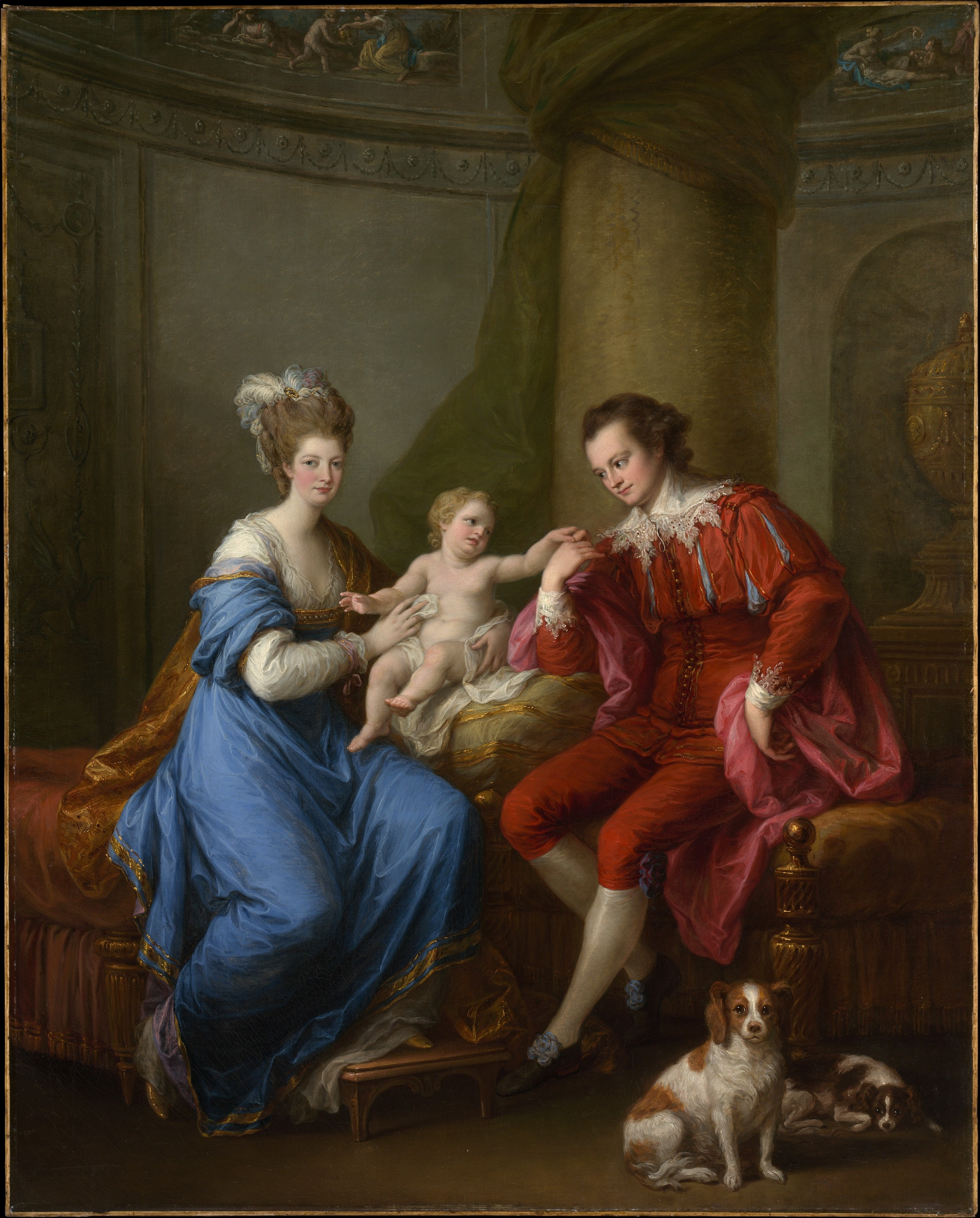
Lady Elizabeth Hamilton with her husband Edward Smith Stanley, Twelfth Earl of Derby and their son Edward, ca 1776, family portrait painting by Angelica Kauffmann

By the time of her first London season, Lady Elizabeth (also known as Betty) was considered very eligible, with her name being linked to many young noblemen. In 1773, the wealthy Edward Smith-Stanley, Lord Stanley came of age and pursued "a brief and fervent courtship" with Lady Elizabeth, holding an opulent party in her honour. The following year, during their engagement, he held an even more extravagant party with the young couple dressed in Anthony van Dyck-style costumes. On 23 June 1774, the two were married. Playwright John Burgoyne hosted a "glittering" assembly after the wedding, in which he wrote the comedy The Maid of the Oaks in honour of the occasion. The extravagant event included choreographed dancers, acrobatic troupes, famous opera singers, and – for the grand finale – a mock wedding attended by nymphs with Lady Elizabeth presented at its altar.

Elizabeth gave birth in quick succession to a son and two daughters. Lord Stanley succeeded his grandfather in 1776, becoming Earl of Derby, while Elizabeth became his Countess. With her new elevated rank, Lady Derby was popular in the beau monde and her actions garnered significant press attention. Along with the Duchess of Devonshire, she was considered a leader of fashion. In 1777, she organised a cricket match in which the two teams were populated with upper-class women, unusual for the time period.

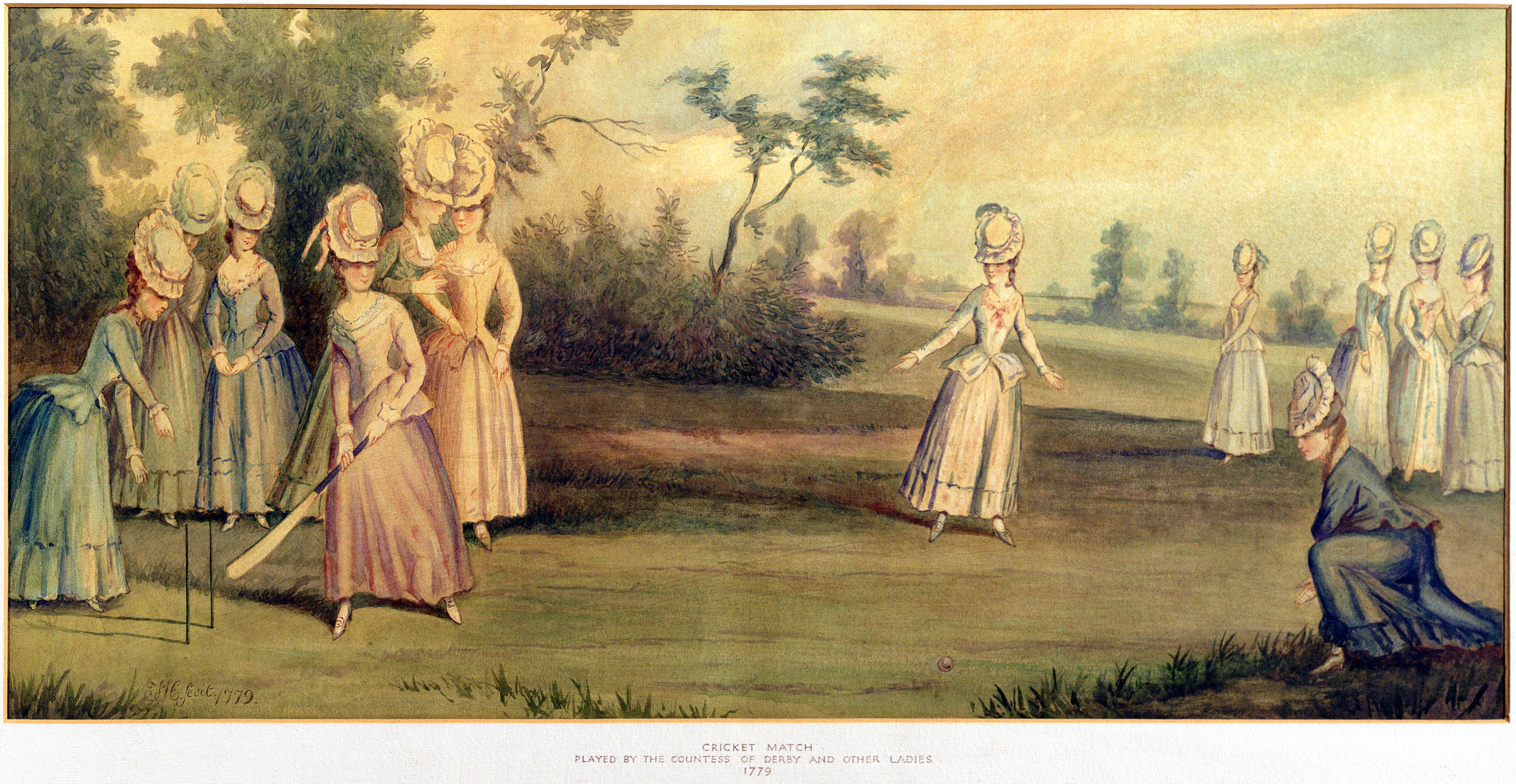
The cricket Match Played by the Countess of Derby and other ladies in 1779

During or near 1776, a painting of the family was done by Angelica Kauffman. Lady Derby's mother is most likely the one responsible for commissioning this work, or it may have been gifted to her. Kauffman painted two versions of a sitting portrait of the earl, countess, and their son; one of these works is kept in the Metropolitan Museum of Art, though it is not on display to the public, while the other is in the custody of the family's descendants. Sometime between 1776 and 1778, George Romney painted Lady Derby; the work is now displayed in the National Portrait Gallery.

== Affair and separation ==
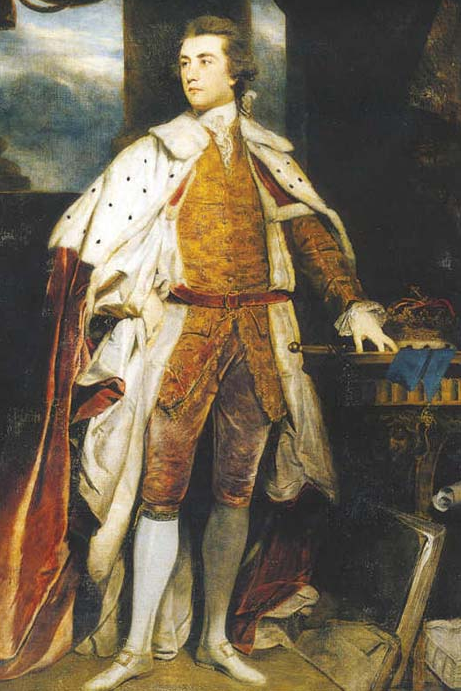
The Duke of Dorset, by Joshua Reynolds

In early 1778, rumours began spreading that Lady Derby was having an affair with John Sackville, 3rd Duke of Dorset, "the most notorious rake of the day." His descendant Victoria Sackville-West later claimed that Sackville would disguise himself as a gardener at the Derby country estate of Knowsley Hall and climb through the Countess' window at night, though another descendant, Robert Sackville-West, 7th Baron Sackville, believes this improbable. By May 1778, rumours of the affair were appearing in the press. That year, Lady Derby's mother – unsuccessfully attempting to put down the rumours and show everyone there was nothing to hide – accompanied her daughter to the theatre. By August 1778, the Countess was openly living apart from her husband in the country amidst gossip that she was suing for divorce.

The affair shocked society and left her ostracised, though Dorset still remained friends with her husband and was even invited to Knowsley on occasion. Lady Derby lost much of the social capital associated with her status. At first, it was assumed that she and the Duke of Dorset would soon be marrying; this caused many of her acquaintances to refrain from snubbing her for fear that she would be returning with a higher status. During this short period, Lady Derby remained in the country while her husband ignored the situation and continued as he normally would have. However, over a year after the separation, the Earl of Derby announced his refusal to divorce his wife. Lady Derby's return to society as a duchess – previously plausible – was ruined, as she was not freed to remarry. The children remained with the earl. Alan G. Crosby posits that "Derby's steadfast refusal to divorce his wife and to grant her access to their children not only added to the sensation but also ruined the rest of her life." Becoming a "chronic invalid," she avoided London society and lived abroad until 1783; meanwhile, her family attempted to persuade the earl to allow for a reconciliation with his wife.

During this period, Lord Derby began a high-profile – but unconsummated – relationship with the actress Elizabeth Farren. From 1781 onwards, the affair was much caricatured in the press, with Derby being comically described as a desperate man unable to convince Farren to a private audience. Amidst this attention, Lady Derby quietly returned to London and gradually began appearing at events, later moving in with her brother the 8th Duke of Hamilton. By 1784, she was accepted in society enough to again be seen accompanying the Duchess of Devonshire. According to historian Hannah Greig, it appears that Lady Derby's social fate was tied to her estranged husband's – as Lord Derby's social capital decreased, hers went up.

No reconciliation ever occurred between husband and wife; instead, the Earl and Farren waited expectantly for Lady Derby's death, which would free him for remarriage. The Countess of Derby died on 14 March 1797 of tuberculosis, and her widowed husband married Farren less than two months later, following her retirement from the stage. Roy Hattersley and Hannah Grieg suggest that Lady Derby's social crime was not that she openly consorted with the Duke, but that she left her husband, while Robert Sackville-West, 7th Baron Sackville states that her mistake was in not conducting the affair more privately.

== Issue ==
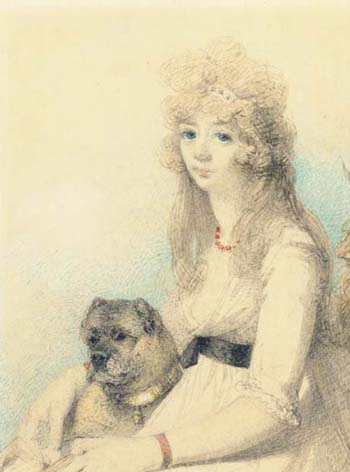
Portrait of Lady Elizabeth Henrietta by George Chinnery (1794).

Lady Derby gave birth to three children:

- Edward Smith-Stanley, 13th Earl of Derby (21 April 1775 – 30 June 1851); married his cousin Charlotte Margaret Hornby, daughter of Reverend Geoffrey Hornby and the Hon. Elizabeth Smith-Stanley
- Lady Charlotte (17 October 1776 – 25 November 1805); married her cousin Edmund Hornby, Esq., son of Reverend Geoffrey Hornby and the Hon. Elizabeth Smith-Stanley
- Lady Elizabeth Henrietta (29 April 1778 – ca. 1857); married Thomas Cole, Esq., and had issue.

Historian Peter Thomson suggests that the third child, Lady Elizabeth Henrietta, was the result of Lady Derby's affair with Dorset. Despite this, the Earl of Derby cared for the child after his wife left him.
