= Venetian ceruse =

Cosmetic product

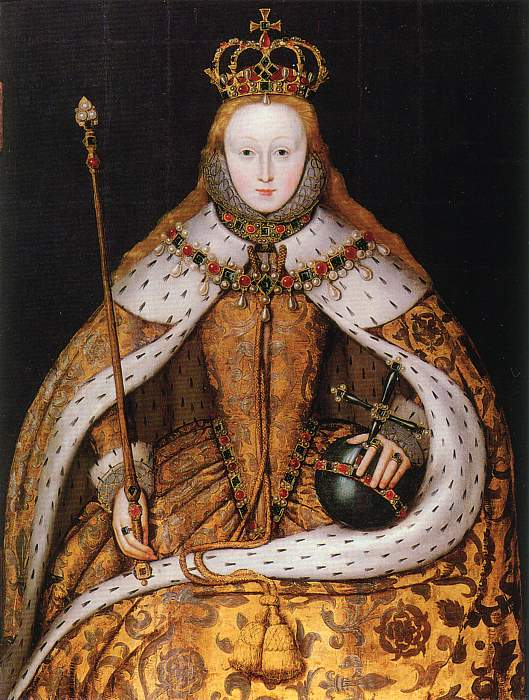
Some sources state that Elizabeth I of England may have used Venetian ceruse.

Venetian ceruse or Venetian white, also known as blanc de céruse de Venise and Spirits of Saturn, was a 16th-century cosmetic used as a skin whitener. It was in great demand and considered the best available at the time, supposedly containing the best quality white lead sourced from Venice, the global merchant capital at the time. It is similar to the regular ceruse, although it was marketed as better, more exclusive, and more expensive than the regular ceruse variant. The regular ceruse white pigment is a basic lead carbonate of chemical formula 2 PbCO_{3}·Pb(OH)_{2}, while the mineral cerussite is a simple carbonate of lead (PbCO_{3}).

A recipe from 1688 described the cosmetic as a mixture of water, vinegar, and lead. The cosmetic's use of white lead as a pigment was detrimental to the human body and caused lead poisoning, skin damage, hair loss and in some cases eventual death.

== Users ==
Venetian ceruse was the most expensive and highly sought-after form of ceruse, making it almost exclusive to high status individuals or the wealthy class. It was favoured by the European aristocracy due to its high quality and, most notably, was thought to have been used very frequently by Elizabeth I of England. (Note: "After 1558, Elizabeth I of England popularized the use of two toxins in face creams—arsenic and Venetian ceruse, a lead carbonate base dissolved in vinegar.") However some sources state that she may only have been a possible user of Venetian ceruse, and critics including Anna Riehl and Kate Maltby have argued that little historical evidence exists to support the claim that Elizabeth used ceruse. It was thought that Elizabeth I's death may have been caused by chronic lead poisoning and the combined use of other dangerous chemicals present in her cosmetics, such as mercury and arsenic.

Ceruse was also blamed for the death of an 18th-century London socialite, Maria Coventry, Countess of Coventry, in 1760. Coventry had been a frequent user of ceruse, and is believed to have died of lead poisoning at age 27 as a result of her faithful use of the cosmetic product. The general public referred to her as "Death by Vanity".

Another devout user of Venetian ceruse was Isabella d'Este, whose appearance demonstrated how ceruse caused permanent damage and premature ageing. In 1534, an account by Pietro Aretino described her "smeared face" as "dishonestly ugly and even more dishonestly made up."

Although Venetian ceruse was certainly predominantly used by women, it was also thought to have been used by some men in royalty during the 16th century. A light skin complexion was sought after by men as it became a symbol of aristocracy, and suggested that the individual did not have to engage in labour work outdoors that would tan their skin.

== Ceruse variants ==
Variants of ceruse differ based on their proportions of lead carbonate and white lead. Some sources state that Venetian ceruse was almost identical to regular ceruse, however due to its origins in Venice it was able to be marketed as the best available product on the market. Other sources state that there were marked differences between the two variants of ceruse. In contrast to regular ceruse, Venetian ceruse was said to be made from pure white lead that was more intense and concentrated in its form. Due to the high demand of ceruse sourced straight from Venice, there may have been counterfeit items for sale on the market. The disingenuous ceruse was thought to contain a mixture of chalk or whiting, which compromised the whiteness, brittleness and weight in comparison to Venetian ceruse.

== Chemistry and manufacture ==
=== Chemical composition ===
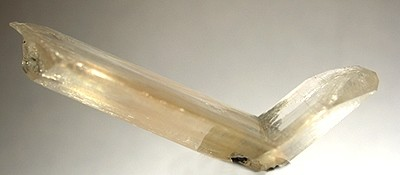
Cerussite, the active ingredient present in Venetian ceruse

The primary active ingredient in Venetian ceruse was white lead (PbCO3·Pb(OH)2) also known as hydrocerrusite, which is a hydrate form of cerrusite. Cerrusite is also known as the heavy metal, lead carbonate (PbCO3), which encourages skin depigmentation.

Apart from its adverse health effects on the human body, white lead had many qualities that made it a valuable ingredient for use in various cosmetic products during the 16th century. Its opaque nature made it an ideal product for concealing imperfections on the skin's surface. The presence of lead compounds in Venetian ceruse allowed it to be dissolved in water to form a thick paste that could be easily absorbed by the body through the skin. When mixed with vinegar, the white lead composition of Venetian ceruse had a cooling and drying effect that would suck moisture from the skin of the individual's face and prevent inflammation. Therefore, ceruse was also commonly used for medicinal purposes by surgeons in the 16th century to dry up moist sores.

White lead was not only used in Venetian ceruse, but also several other 16th century cosmetics. It was contained in blush products for application on the cheeks and used in lip stains by combining red pigments such as vermilion or sandalwood and cinnabar, which contained more harmful compounds such as mercury sulphide.

=== Manufacture ===
The process of manufacturing Venetian ceruse involved carefully placing lead sheets into clay pots partially filled with vinegar. The pots were then sealed with lead lids or packed straw and kept aside for several weeks, allowing lead acetate to form and produce lead carbonate once eventually exposed to air.

The white lead present in ceruse originated from various locations around Europe, however Italy was the major manufacturer of corrosives and had been exporting ceruse since the 14th century. Following the powerful influence of the Venetian Renaissance, Venice quickly became a major merchant and fashion capital during the late Middle Ages and the Renaissance. It was well known for its high-quality luxury goods available at lower prices and played a significant role in the pigment trade. The white lead present in ceruse was the same compound used in cosmetic products, in medications, and by artists to paint with on canvas. As such, the quality and purity of the ceruse was very important to the user. Some sources state that Venetian ceruse was much more expensive than regular ceruse due to its higher purity and refinement, selling for up to twice as much as regular lead white.

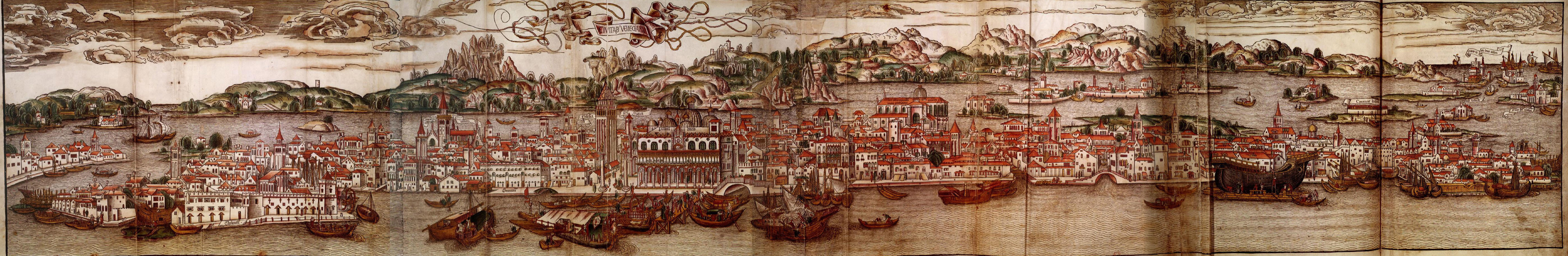
Venice in the 15th century, a global merchant capital famous for trade and high-quality merchandise

== Side effects ==
Many users of Venetian ceruse were aware of its potential to cause adverse health side effects, however they continued to use the product regardless. It was not until the end of the 18th century that scientific studies officially concluded the severity of health problems caused by the presence of lead in cosmetic products. In 2010, the World Health Organization (WHO) declared lead as one of the ten major chemicals of concern in cosmetics. Some sources state that small amounts of lead carbonate exposed to humans can elevate blood levels to high levels of toxicity. WHO stated that side effects of lead are most prominent following either chronic exposure or short-term exposure to high doses. Long-term use of Venetian ceruse was detrimental to the human body as high amounts of lead were constantly absorbed by the skin. Use of this cosmetic involved the direct application of harmful lead carbonate compounds onto the face, causing users to experience lead poisoning.

Symptoms of lead poisoning were painful and unpleasant for the affected individual, including but not limited to acute abdominal pain, muscle paralysis, mental confusion and uncontrollable convulsions. More common symptoms of lead poisoning include nausea, abdominal pain, high blood pressure, and reduced fertility for both men and women. Long-term usage of Venetian ceruse caused organ damage and in some cases eventual death. Lead toxicity has also been found to cause intellectual impairment and damage to the bones, kidneys, and liver in particular. Superficial side effects included hair loss, particularly at the front of the hairline. It is suspected that the hair loss experienced by many women of status during the 16th century gave rise to the Elizabethan beauty ideal of possessing a high forehead. However, balding may also have been associated with syphilis, a common disease during the Renaissance period whose symptoms include hair loss.

The reason Venetian ceruse was favoured over other 16th-century cosmetic powders such as starch, alabaster, and crushed mother-of-pearl was due largely to its ease of application and ability to adhere to the skin. Other skin lighteners during the 16th century containing mercury and acidic ingredients were more harsh and would remove the superficial epidermis of the skin or stop the production of melanin. Some sources state that the faithful application of ceruse by many was a result of the side effects caused by its lead compounds. The lead compounds caused the skin to mottle and peel with long-term usage, which left blemishes and scarring on the skin's surface. These blemishes were subsequently concealed by applying more layers of the product, creating a cycle whereby women were dependent on Venetian ceruse for vanity on a daily basis. The product was also commonly used to conceal blemishes, pimples, or freckles, or scars left over from diseases such as smallpox. It was thought that Elizabeth I of England may have contracted smallpox in 1562, which left scarring on her skin and brought about her later faithful use of Venetian ceruse to hide the blemishes that remained.

== History ==
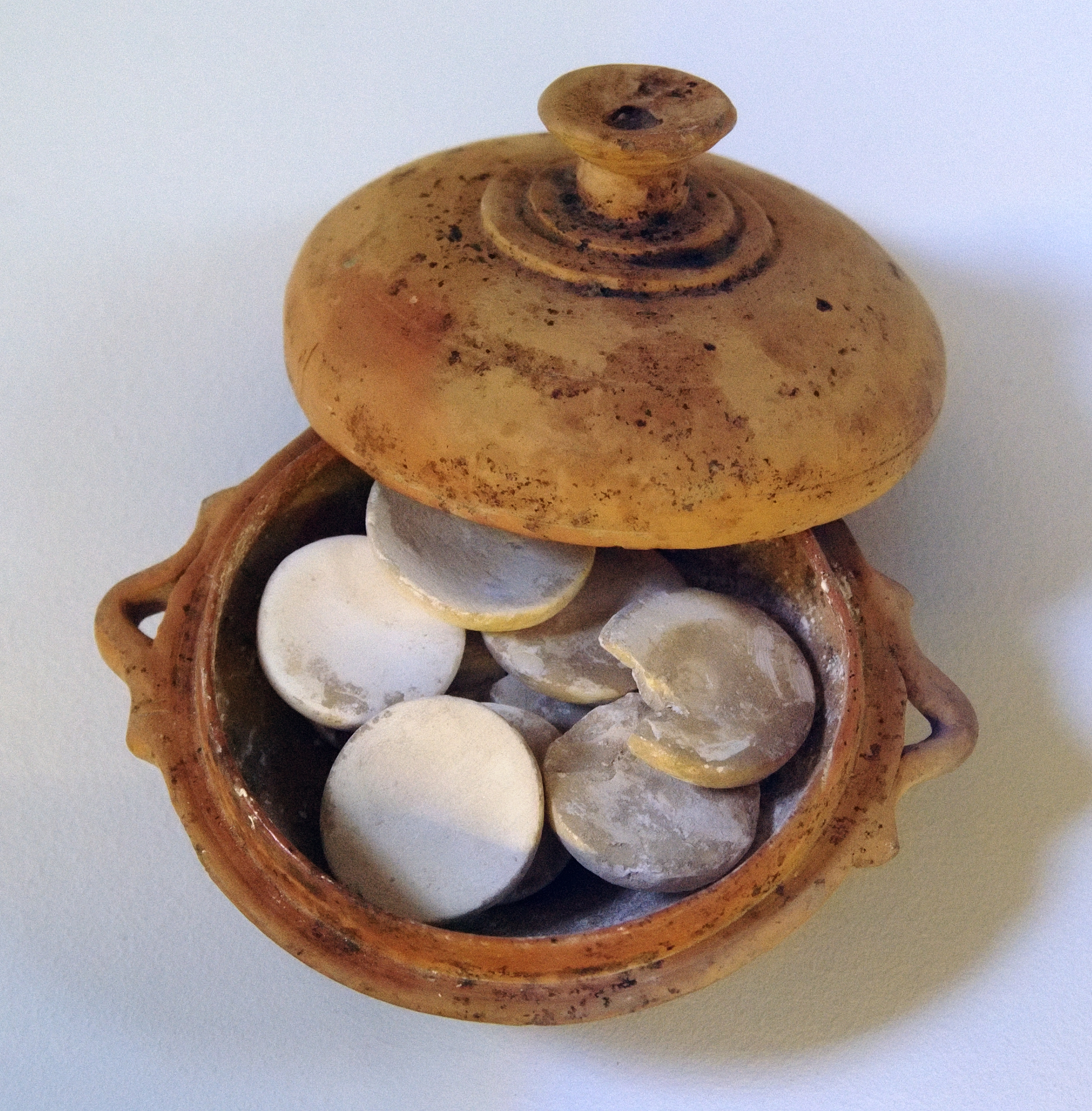
White lead in the form of moulded tablets, once used as a cosmetic in Ancient Greece

=== Historical uses of ceruse ===
The practice of deliberate skin lightening initially began in ancient Rome, where lead carbonate was used to whiten the skin. Light skin was thought to be a symbol of femininity, and the beauty ideals during that time favoured clarity of the individuals' skin. Lead carbonate was also used throughout ancient Egypt and Greece as a white cosmetic, known as cerussa. The basic ingredient of cerussa was white lead, and it was used by Roman women to cover blemishes and enhance skin colour. The Egyptians used lead sulphide in kohl, for application as makeup typically around the eye.

=== Beauty ideals ===
The ideal beauty standards during the late Middle Ages and early Renaissance saw women aiming to achieve a white complexion contrasted by bright red cheeks and lips. The complexion many women strived towards was one that was as "bright as moonlight" and "fair as snow". During the Middle Ages, individuals had little access to effective medicine for treatment of the many diseases that were rampant at the time. Having fair, clear skin free from blemishes was therefore very highly sought after as it was considered to be a social indicator of an individual in good health and fertility for women.

Despite the Elizabethan beauty ideals women faced, the wearing of cosmetics was not received well by the general public. Women who used cosmetic products, including Venetian ceruse, were often viewed as promiscuous and unfaithful. Some sources state that acne, a side effect of using ceruse, was even associated with witchcraft during the 16th century. Although the use of ceruse was rather visibly noticeable upon the individual's face, many women chose to keep their use of Venetian ceruse a secret and did not disclose this information even to their families. The use of Venetian ceruse was largely for the purpose of enhancing beauty by creating a smooth, natural complexion. However, many non-users made commentary on its unnatural appearance and condemned women for using lead-based cosmetics despite their known adverse side effects. Maria Coventry, Countess of Coventry was said to have adopted the beauty ideals of the time while in Paris, however her husband, Earl of Coventry, disapproved and attempted to wipe the Venetian ceruse from her face in public. Cosmetics were also referred to as the Latin word fucus translating to "false colour", further suggesting that wearing makeup was "not natural".

Skin lightening practices, such as the wearing of Venetian ceruse, may not have been directly racially motivated during the Elizabethan era. Rather, the pursuit of a fair complexion was largely driven by its associations with high status and wealth of the individual. This was because labour workers who performed outdoor work under direct sunlight developed tanned skin, whereas individuals in higher positions within society had the luxury of staying indoors and did not engage in employment. Elizabeth I of England was only ever depicted with fair white skin to emphasise her nobility and high status. Many portraits during the Elizabethan era also depicted servants with a dark complexion in the background, to contrast the "lightness" of the main subject with a fairer complexion.

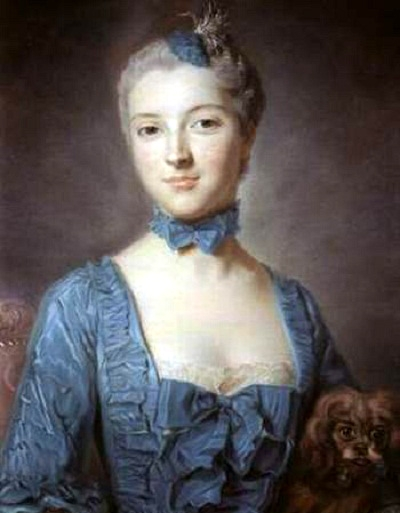
A portrait of Maria Coventry representing 18th-century beauty ideals of a clear, fair complexion with rouged cheeks and lips

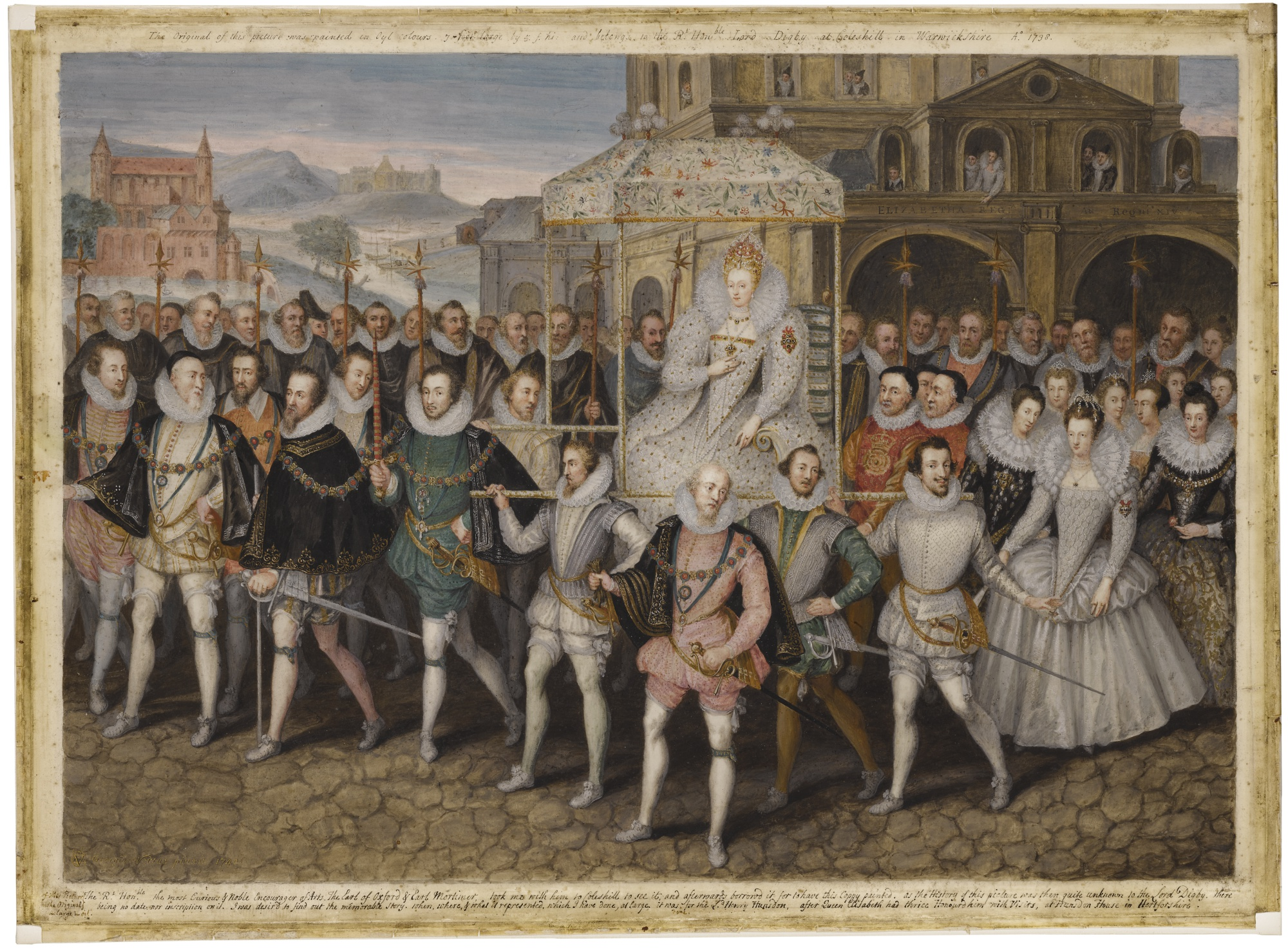
The procession of Elizabeth I of England. She has been portrayed with a lightness about her and dons a very fair complexion, indicative of her nobility.
