= John Finlayson (engraver) =

English engraver

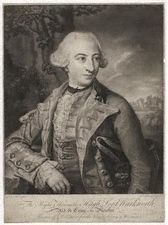
Portrait of Hugh Percy, 2nd Duke of Northumberland, ca. 1765

John Finlayson (c. 1730–1776) was an English engraver.

Finlayson was born about the year 1730, and worked in London. In 1773 he received a premium from the Society of Arts, and about three years after this he died. He engraved in mezzotint several portraits, and a few plates of historical subjects.

== Selected Portraits ==
- The Duchess of Gloucester; after Sir Joshua Reynolds.
- Lady Charles Spenoer; after the same.
- Lady Elizabeth Melbourne; after the same.
- The Earl of Buchan; after the same.
- Miss Wynyard; after the same.
- Lady Broughton; after Cotes.
- The Duke of Northumberland; after Hamilton.
- Miss Metcalfe; after Hone.

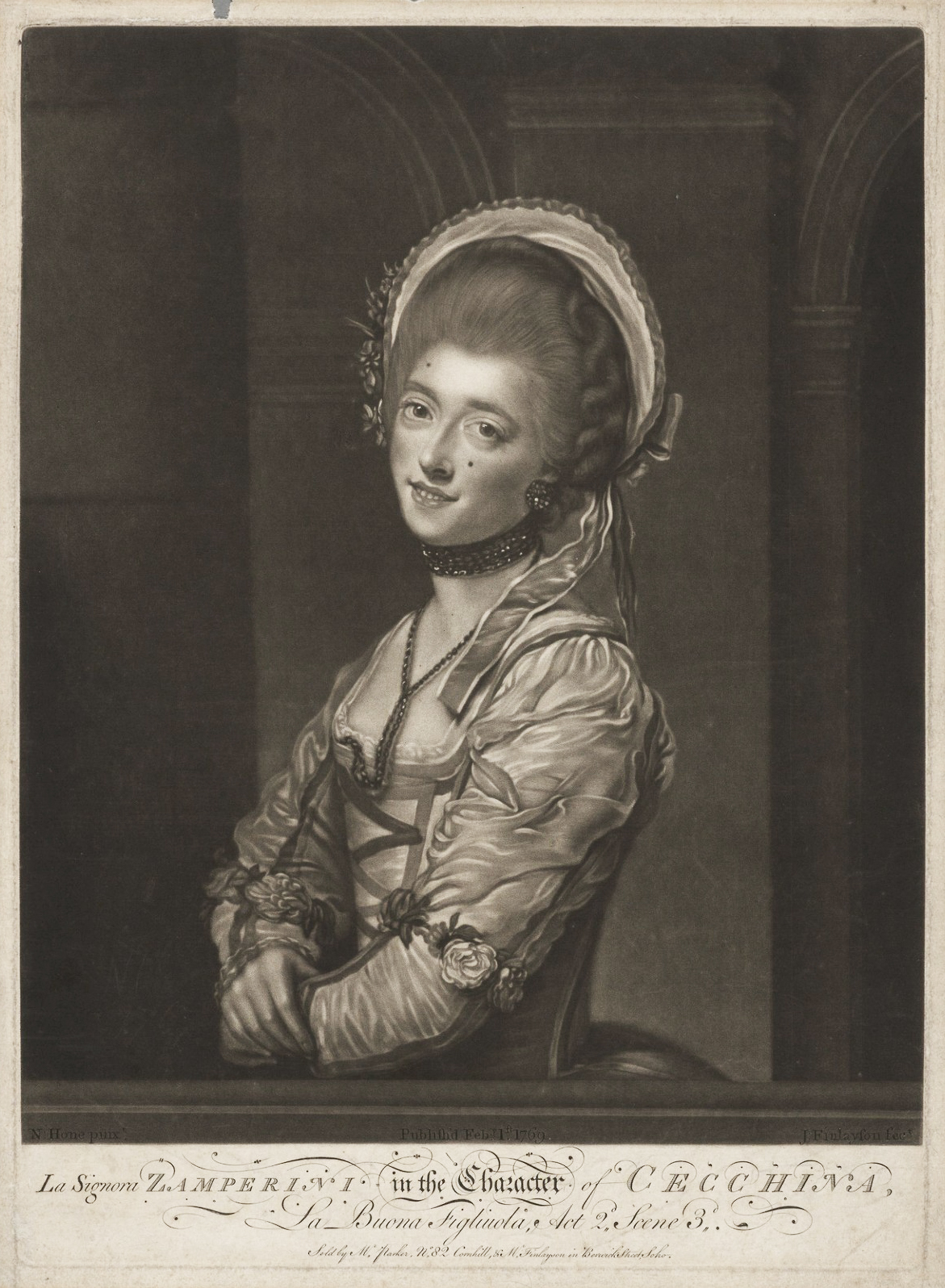
Signora Zamperini La buona figliuola, 1769

- Signora Zamperini, in 'La Buona Figliuola' ; after the same.
- William Drummond, Scotch historian; after C. Janssens.
- Shooter, Beard, and Dunstall, in 'Love in a Village' ; after Zoffany.

== Subjects ==
- Candaules, King of Lydia, showing his Queen coming out of the Bath to his favourite Gyges; after his own design.
- A. Collier, with his Pipe; after J. Weenix.
