= James Hamilton, 6th Duke of Hamilton =

Scottish peer (1724–1758)

His Grace The Duke of Hamilton KT
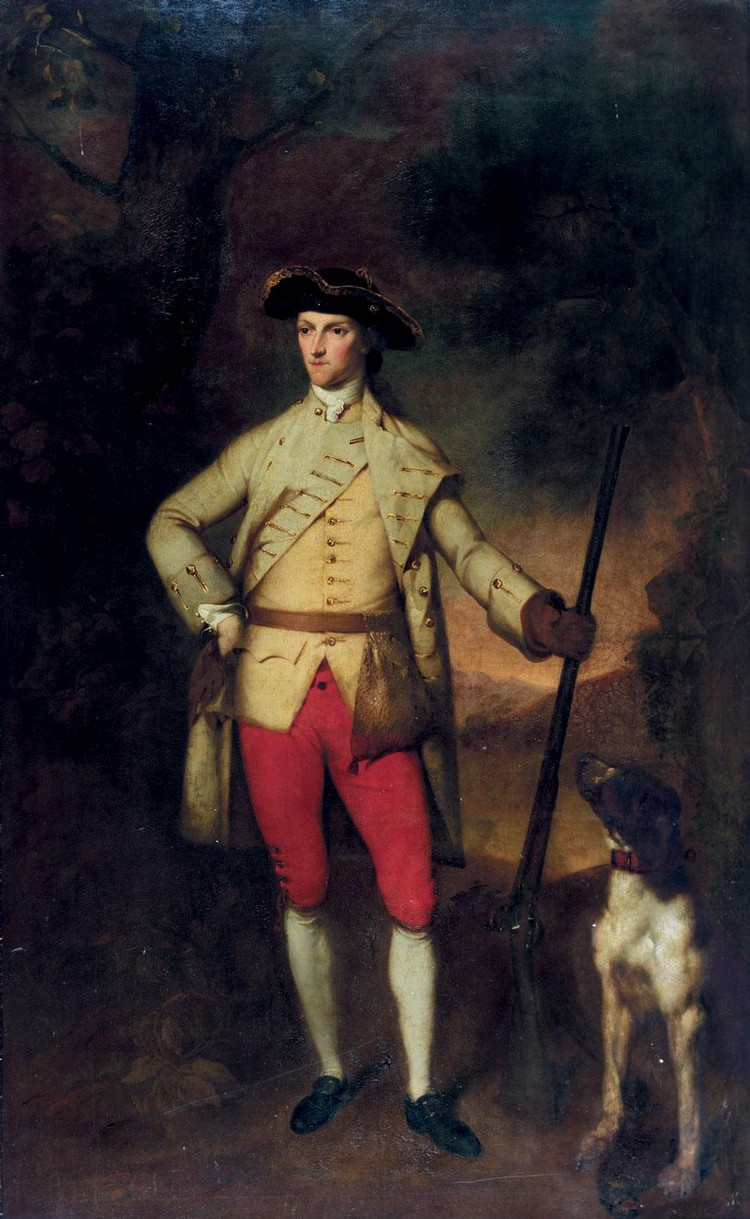

Personal details
- Born: 10 July 1724
- Died: 17 January 1758 (aged 33) Great Tew, Oxfordshire, England
- Spouse: Elizabeth Gunning (m. 1752)
- Children: Lady Elizabeth Hamilton; James Hamilton, 7th Duke of Hamilton; Douglas Hamilton, 8th Duke of Hamilton
- Parents: James Hamilton, 5th Duke of Hamilton; Lady Anne Cochrane

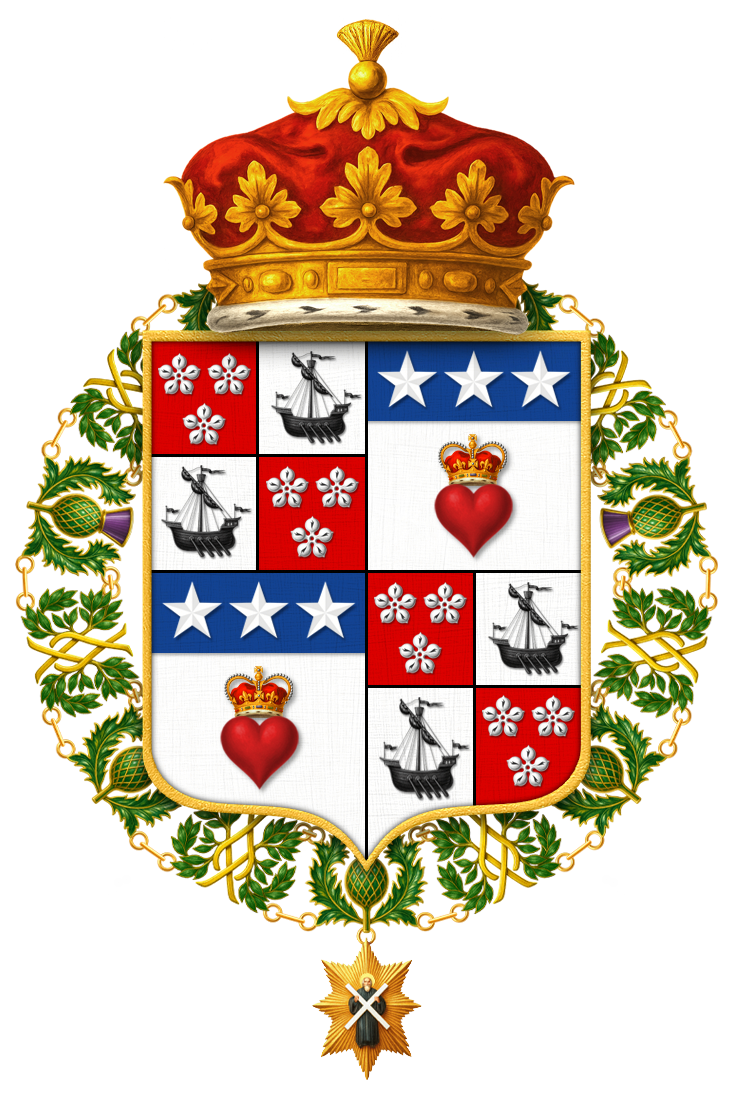
Shield of arms of James Hamilton, 6th Duke of Hamilton, KT

James George Hamilton, 6th Duke of Hamilton and 3rd Duke of Brandon, KT (10 July 1724 – 17 January 1758) was a Scottish peer.

== Early years and education ==
Hamilton was the son of the 5th Duke of Hamilton, and his first wife, the former Lady Anne Cochrane, and was styled as Marquess of Clydesdale from his birth until his father's death. He was educated at Winchester College from 1734 to 1740. He matriculated at St Mary Hall, Oxford on 23 February 1741, knighted into the Order of the Thistle in or around 1742, and created a DCL on 14 April 1743.

On 14 February (St. Valentine's Day) 1752, Hamilton met the society beauty Elizabeth Gunning at Bedford House in London. According to Horace Walpole, the duke wished to marry her that night and he called for a local parson to perform the ceremony. However, without a licence, calling of banns and a ring, the parson refused and they were eventually married that night in Mayfair Chapel (which did not require a licence) in a clandestine marriage, with a ring from a bed curtain. The couple had three children:

- Lady Elizabeth Hamilton (26 January 1753 – 14 March 1797), married Edward Smith-Stanley, 12th Earl of Derby
- James Hamilton, 7th Duke of Hamilton (18 February 1755 – 7 July 1769)
- Douglas Hamilton, 8th Duke of Hamilton (24 July 1756 – 2 August 1799)

On 2 March 1743, he succeeded to his father's title of Duke of Hamilton.

== Death ==
He died on 17 January 1758, aged 33, at Great Tew, Oxfordshire, from a cold caught whilst out hunting. He was buried in February 1758 at the family mausoleum at Hamilton, South Lanarkshire.

== Holyrood Palace and Abbey ==
The Duke was hereditary keeper of the Palace of Holyroodhouse in Edinburgh, but all but his apartments in the building had been reduced to a state of dereliction by the time of his death. He was responsible for commissioning the reroofing of Holyrood Abbey with stone slabs. The excessive weight of the new roof caused it to collapse in 1768, taking more of the building with it.

== Freemasonry ==
The 6th Duke of Hamilton held the position of Right Worshipful Master of the local Masonic Lodge, Hamilton Kilwinning No.7 for three consecutive years from 1753 to 1755.

== Ancestry ==
Ancestors of James Hamilton, 6th Duke of Hamilton

16. William Douglas, 1st Marquess of Douglas
8. William Hamilton, Duke of Hamilton
17. Lady Mary Gordon
4. James Hamilton, 4th Duke of Hamilton
18. James Hamilton, 1st Duke of Hamilton
9. Anne Hamilton, 3rd Duchess of Hamilton
19. Lady Mary Feilding
2. James Hamilton, 5th Duke of Hamilton
20. Charles Gerard, 4th Baron Gerard
10. Digby Gerard, 5th Baron Gerard
21. Jane Digby
5. The Hon. Elizabeth Gerard
22. Charles Gerard, 1st Earl of Macclesfield
11. Lady Elizabeth Gerard
23. Jeanne de Civelle
1. James Hamilton, 6th Duke of Hamilton
24. William Cochrane, Lord Cochrane
12. John Cochrane, 2nd Earl of Dundonald
25. Lady Katherine Kennedy
6. John Cochrane, 4th Earl of Dundonald
26. William Hamilton, Duke of Hamilton (= 8.)
13. Lady Susannah Hamilton
27. Anne Hamilton, 3rd Duchess of Hamilton (= 9.)
3. Lady Anne Cochrane
28. John Murray, 1st Marquess of Atholl
14. Charles Murray, 1st Earl of Dunmore
29. Lady Amelia Stanley
7. Lady Anne Murray
30. Richard Watts
15. Catherine Watts
31. Catherine Werden

Peerage of Scotland
Preceded by James Hamilton	Duke of Hamilton; 1743–1758	Succeeded by James Hamilton
Peerage of Great Britain
Preceded by James Hamilton	Duke of Brandon; 1743–1758	Succeeded by James Hamilton
