= Vélez (name) =

Spanish family name

- Pronunciation: Spain – Spanish pronunciation: [ˈbeleθ]; Latin America – Spanish pronunciation: [ˈbeles]

Origin
- Origin: Portuguese, Spanish and Basque
- Meaning: Uncertain, but possibly son or descendant of Vela (meaning "warlike")
- Region of origin: Spain or Portugal

Other names
- Variant forms: Vela, Vélaz, Velez

Vélez is a surname of Spanish origin. Although it has been suggested that it could be derived from Basque, it is, in fact, a patronym from the medieval name Vela, which itself is derived from Vigila (Wigila), a Germanic name used by the Visigoths. In its earliest usage, the surname took the forms of Vigílaz and Vélaz.

Family researchers maintain that the surname was first found in Cantabria, although there are various places scattered throughout the south, especially in Andalusia, called Vélez, including Vélez-Blanco, Vélez-Málaga and Vélez-Rubio.

== People ==
One of the many Marquis of Los Vélez.

=== Surname ===
- Ada Vélez (born 1970), Puerto Rican female boxer
- Álvaro Uribe (born 1952), President of Colombia
- Carlos Arango Vélez (1897–1974), Colombian politician
- Clemente Soto Vélez (1905–1993), Puerto Rican nationalist, poet, journalist, and activist
- David Vélez (businessman), Colombian CEO and founder of Nubank
- Desiree Marie Velez, Puerto Rican–American actor
- Eddie Velez (born 1958), American actor
- Eugenio Vélez (born 1982), Dominican Republic baseball player
- Fermín Vélez (1959–2003), Spanish racecar driver
- Glen Velez, American musician
- Higinio Vélez (c. 1947–2021), Cuban baseball manager
- Humberto Vélez, Mexican voice actor
- Ion Vélez (born 1985), Spanish footballer
- Ivelisse Vélez (born 1988) Puerto Rican professional wrestler
- Jane Velez-Mitchell, American news journalist
- José A. Vélez Jr. (born 1963), Puerto Rican jockey
- José Luis Rodríguez Vélez (1915–1984), Panamanian composer and musician
- Juan Vélez (born 1983), Puerto Rican singer, musician and songwriter
- Julián Estiven Vélez (born 1982), Colombian footballer
- Lauren Vélez (born 1964), American actress, twin sister of Loraine
- Lilian Velez (1924–1948), Filipino film actress and singer
- Lisa Velez (born 1967), American lead singer of Lisa Lisa and Cult Jam
- Loraine Vélez (born 1964), American actress, twin sister of Lauren
- Lupe Vélez (1908–1944), Mexican–American actress
- Marco Vélez, Puerto Rican soccer player
- Otto Vélez, Puerto Rican baseball player
- Pedro Vélez (1787–1848), Mexican politician and lawyer
- Simón Vélez (born 1949), Colombian architect
- Wilkins Vélez (born 1953), Puerto Rican pop music singer and composer

=== First surname ===
- Silvestre Vélez de Escalante, Franciscan missionary
- Íñigo Vélez de Guevara, 7th Count of Oñate (1566–1644)
- Íñigo Vélez de Guevara, 8th Count of Oñate (1597–1658)
- Íñigo Vélez de Guevara, 10th Count of Oñate (1642–1699)
- Luís Vélez de Guevara (1579–1644), Spanish dramatist and novelist
- Dalmacio Vélez Sársfield (1801–1875), Argentine lawyer and politician

=== Fictional ===
- Jaime Velez (Oz), Latino inmate on the HBO drama Oz
- Valeria Velez, fictional mistress of Pablo Escobar in the Netflix series Narcos. Based on the Colombian journalist Virginia Vallejo.

== See also ==
- Velez (disambiguation)
- Veles (disambiguation)
