= William H. Worthington =

American lawyer (1828–1862)

- Born: William Hord Worthington; November 2, 1828; Harrodsburg, Kentucky, United States
- Died: May 22, 1862 (aged 33); Corinth, Mississippi
- Alma mater: Bacon College
- Relatives: Edward Worthington (grandfather); Gabriel Slaughter (grandfather); Elsie Clews (granddaughter); Henry Clews Jr. (grandson)
- Military career
- Allegiance: United States; Union
- Branch: United States Army; Union Army
- Service years: 1861-1862
- Rank: Colonel
- Commands: 5th Iowa Volunteer Infantry Regiment
- Conflicts: Battle of New Madrid; Battle of Corinth

William Hord Worthington (November 2, 1828 – May 22, 1862) was an American lawyer, farmer and military officer. During the American Civil War, he was the first commanding officer of the 5th Iowa Volunteer Infantry Regiment.

== Early life ==
Worthington was born in Harrodsburg, Kentucky on November 2, 1828. He was the son of Reverend John Tolly Worthington described as "a devoted Christian and a zealous patriot". His mother died shortly after he was born and was adopted and raised by his grand-uncle, Major William Hord, a distinguished Kentucky gentleman.

Both of his grandfathers were well-known Kentucky frontiersman, Edward Worthington and Gabriel Slaughter, who served as the 4th Lieutenant Governor the 7th Governor of Kentucky. Worthington's ancestry can be traced to President James Monroe.

He was educated in Louisville, and became interested in a military career after meeting a visiting Polish officer, and eventually graduated from Bacon College.

== Career ==
After graduation from Bacon College, he married and settled down as a farmer, however, being unsuccessful at it, he instead pursued a career in law. He was eventually admitted to the bar and opened a small practice in Harrodsburg. In 1857, he moved his practice to Iowa where he continued as a practicing lawyer until the start of the American Civil War four years later.

=== Military career ===
At the start of the Civil War, he had been serving as a captain with a military company in Keokuk referred to as the "City Rifles". His military skill was brought to the attention of Governor Samuel J. Kirkwood who offered him a colonelcy in the state militia. Worthington had intended to enlist in the regular U.S. Army in Washington City, however he was rejected due to all vacancies being filled and accepted the Governor's offer. After returning to Iowa in early July, he officially took command of the 5th Iowa Volunteer Infantry Regiment on July 15, 1861.

The 5th Iowa Volunteers had a proud and distinguished history under Worthington during the first months of the war. Worthington served in Missouri with his regiment before leaving Jefferson Barracks on August 14. Arriving at Jefferson City, they stayed until September 1 and marched to Columbia, Boonville, Glasgow, Springfield and Syracuse. Turning back towards Boonville, they eventually arrived at Cairo, Illinois on February 20, 1862. Worthington and his unit had not yet encountered enemy forces, however they were considered to be one of the best drilled and disciplined regiments in volunteer service. As a result, Worthington was initially not popular with his men and were often restless and discontented under his strict discipline. According to a semi-official order from General John Pope in October 1861, he wrote to Worthington that "your regiment is the most soldierly-appearing one I have seen in Missouri." and credited him and his men for their service. He also rescued a private from drowning in the Mississippi River, an action which the respect and esteem of his regiment.

After three days at Cairo, he and his men crossed the Mississippi and marched to Benton, Missouri and from there accompanied General Pope to New Madrid. He was conspicuous during the 10-day siege, eventually assuming command of a brigade to capture the Upper Fort. During the battle, he led Companies A and B of the 5th Iowa Regiment and three companies of the 39th Indiana Regiment which fought gallantly. Following the surrender of Island No. 10 on April 7, Worthington was again absent while his regiment were conducting operations in the area. He sailed to Hamburg Landing on the Tennessee River joining Pope's forces prior to the siege of Corinth. It was in the early morning hours of May 22 that, while in performing his duties as general officer of the day, that he was shot and killed by a sentry.

=== Death ===
It was around 2 a.m. in near pitch black darkness that the sentry, leaving his post, walked to the rear as Worthington approached. He had apparently forgotten he was still within Union lines and mistook Worthington for an enemy soldier and fired without calling out to the approaching figure. Worthington was hit near the left eye and thought to have been killed instantly.

His death was mourned by his regiment, as well as his old unit the "City Rifles" and the district court of his home county. Judge Francis Springer commented that all "mourned the loss, and cherished the memory of the noble-hearted, brave and heroic Worthington". He also had a promising career in the military being recommended for promotion and, had he survived the battle at Corinth, he would have been promoted to the rank of brigadier general. General Pope also made an official statement commenting "In Colonel Worthington, this army has sustained a serious loss. Prompt, gallant and patriotic, a brilliant military career was before him".

== Personal life ==
In 1847, Worthington was married to Anna Eliza Tomlinson (1831–1909). Together, they were the parents of three children, including Lucy Madison Worthington (1851–1945), who married Henry Clews, a British born financier and author. Worthington was buried at Oakland Cemetery in Keokuk, Iowa.

=== Descendants ===
Through his daughter Lucy, he was a posthumous grandfather of Elsie Worthington Clews (1875–1941), an anthropologist who married U.S. Representative Herbert Parsons, a son of John Edward Parsons; and Henry Clews Jr. (1876–1937), an artist who married divorced New York socialite Louise Hollingsworth (née Morris) Gebhard in 1901. They also divorced and in 1914 he married Elsie "Marie" (née Whelan) Goelet, the first wife of Robert Wilson Goelet. They lived at the Château de la Napoule in France.
