= Mojácar =

- Municipality
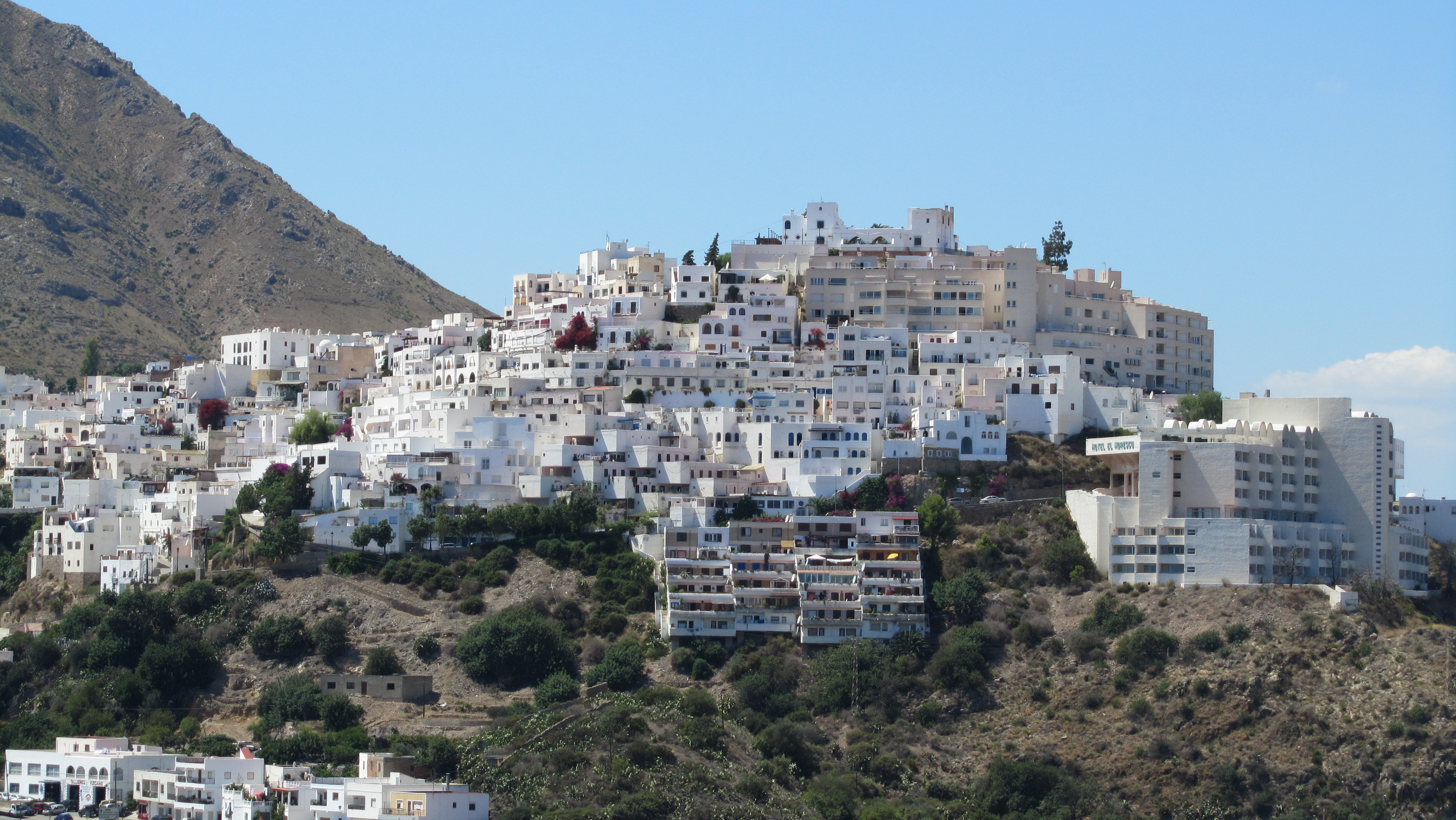

- Coat of arms

- Location in Spain. Mojácar (Andalusia) Mojácar (Spain)
- Coordinates: 37°08′25″N 1°51′05″W
- Country: Spain
- Autonomous community: Andalusia
- Province: Almería
- Comarca: Levante Almeriense

Government
  - Mayor: Rosa Maria Cano Montoya (PP)

Area
  - Total: 72 km^{2} (28 sq mi)
- Elevation: 152 m (499 ft)

Population (2023)
  - Total: 7,386
  - Density: 100/km^{2} (270/sq mi)
- Demonym: Mojaqueros
- Time zone: UTC+1 (CET)
  - Summer (DST): UTC+2 (CEST)

Mojácar (Spanish pronunciation: [moˈxakaɾ]) is a municipality situated in the southeast of the Province of Almería (Andalucia) in southern Spain, bordering the Mediterranean Sea. It is 90 km from the capital of the province, Almería. It is an elevated mountain village displaying the traditional white colour from its earlier days. There is also a tourist resort to the south of the town, on the coast, called Mojácar Playa.

== Demographics ==
Historical population
Year	Pop.	±%
2006	6,406	—
2007	6,507	+1.6%
2008	6,805	+4.6%
2009	7,581	+11.4%
2010	7,745	+2.2%
2011	8,090	+4.5%
2012	8,173	+1.0%
2013	8,360	+2.3%
2014	6,838	−18.2%
2015	6,825	−0.2%
2016	6,490	−4.9%
2017	6,330	−2.5%
2018	6,301	−0.5%
2019	6,403	+1.6%
2020	6,778	+5.9%
2021	7,257	+7.1%
2022	7,527	+3.7%
2023	7,386	−1.9%
Source: INE (Spain)

== History ==
Mojácar has been inhabited by many different groups since antiquity. Populated since the Bronze Age around 2000 BC, traders such as the Phoenicians and Carthaginians arrived to serve the growing communities. Under Greek dominion, the settlement was called Murgis-Akra, whence came the Latinized Moxacar, the arab Muxacra, and finally the current name of Mojácar.

Murgis-Akra and its lands became incorporated into the Nasrid sultanate, and the town found itself on the frontier with the Christian forces to the east. Watchtowers and fortresses were built, or reinforced, during the 14th century. On June 10, 1488, the town was annexed to the Kingdom of Castile.

Mojácar, once again, began to expand until the early 18th century, when the census of the time recorded 10,000 people. Around the middle of the 19th century, Mojácar began another period of decline.

Several severe droughts brought about this drop in the town's fortunes, with a consequent emigration to other parts of Spain, Europe or Hispanic America. The depopulation of the town was halted in the 1960s when tourism began to reverse the trend.

== Climate ==
Mojácar has more than 3000 hours of sun per year. Rainfall is seldom and weak, with an average rainfall of 200mm per year. The average yearly temperature is around 20 °C. Winter is normally mild.

The average temperature in winter varies between 10 °C and 18 °C.

The average temperature in summer varies between 26 °C and 32 °C.

Thanks to Mojácar's proximity to the sea, the maximum temperature in summer is considered mild. However, in the inland zones of Almeria during summer, day time temperatures can reach 40 °C; even the low evening temperature is high enough to warrant the use of airconditioning, especially during June, July and August.

== Culture ==
=== Indalo ===
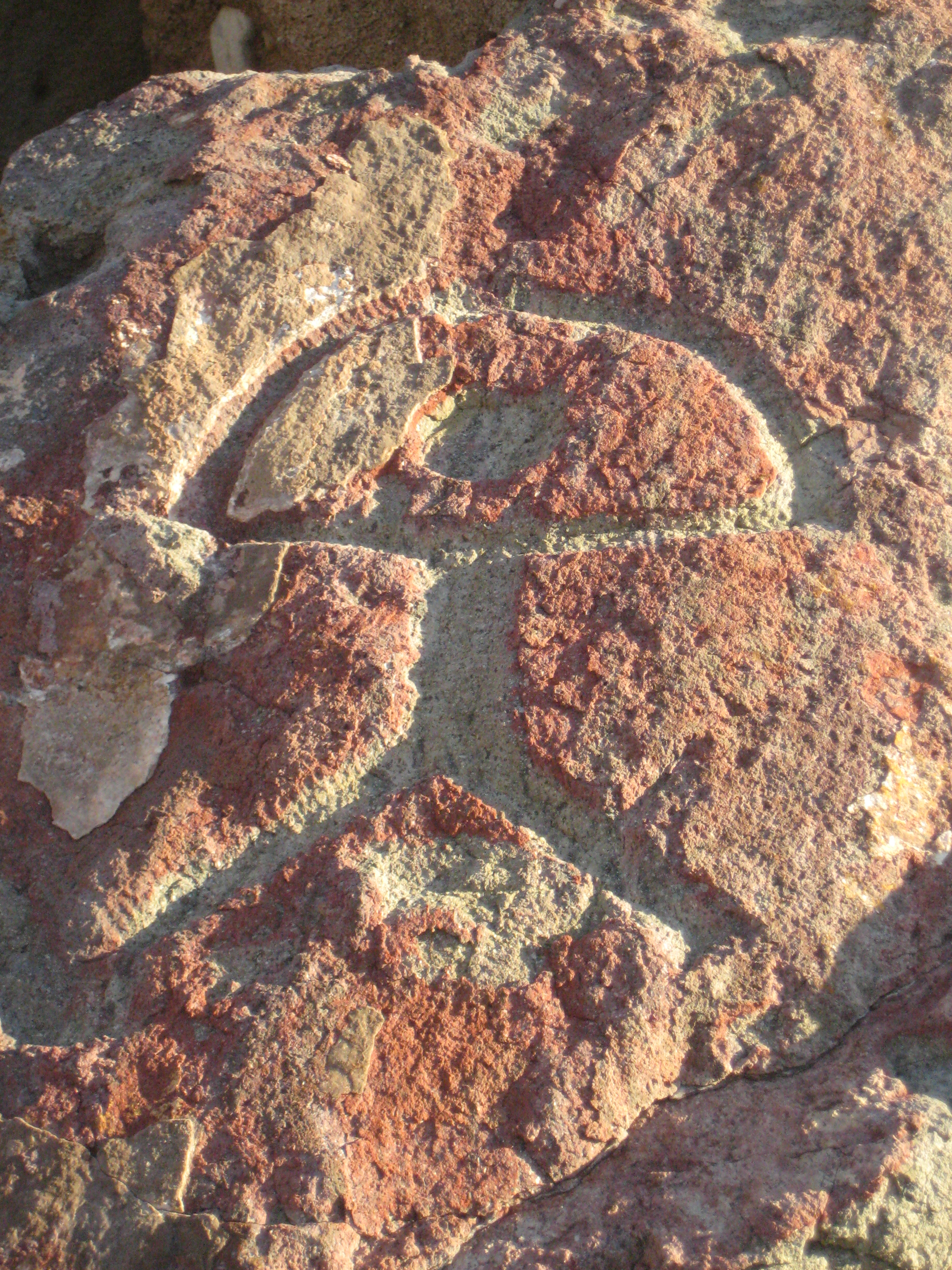
The Indalo has become a symbol of Mojácar and the province of Almería.

The Indalo, or Mojácar man, is a magical totem said to bring protection and good luck. From times past was painted onto the fronts of houses once the whitewash was dry with the belief that it kept away the evil eye and protected those within from storms. The figure might be interpreted as a man holding a rainbow between his outstretched arms. The original totem is thought to be around 4,500 years old, and the earliest known one appears among other prehistoric paintings in a cave in Vélez-Blanco. The name Indalo was coined by a group of artists and intellectuals who settled in Mojácar in the early 1960s, attracted by the atmosphere of the town, and who commercialised the totem which today signifies the whole province of Almería. Due to tourism, the Indalo Man has spread in popularity and has been seen on houses in various parts of Europe such as Brittany in France and Cornwall in England.Source: INE (Spain)

- More information about the Indalo connection with Mojácar

In media, in the 1982 film Conan the Barbarian, Arnold Schwarzenegger appeared ritually tattooed with several Indalo representations. In fact, the film was recorded in Almeria province.

=== Cultural associations ===
Mojácar is home to the Fundación Valparaíso, an international artists' colony founded by Beatrice and Paul Beckett. The foundation continues to host international artists in a 16th c. farmhouse on a working olive farm.

=== Cuisine ===
The traditional dishes still found in Mojácar reflect the rural nature. Amongst its plain cuisine, the most well known dishes are: gurullos, pelotas, gachas, migas, ajo colorao, and pescado frito.

=== Festivals ===
The most important festivals (Spanish: fiestas) in Mojácar are:

- Easter, special interest on Thursday and Friday with the processions of Jesús Nazareno, Encuentro and Cristo Yaciente
- San Agustín: the patron saint of Mojácar. The fiesta falls on 28 August.
- Romería de San Isidro: 15 May
- San Juan Hogueras: (Bonfires of Saint John) 23–24 June
- La Virgen del Rosario: (Virgin of the Rosary) is the patrona i.e. female patron saint of Mojácar. The fiesta falls on 7 October.
- Fiesta de Moros y Cristianos: is the remembrance of the negotiation and peaceful surrender of Mojácar to the Catholic monarchs at the end of the 15th century. It is celebrated on the closest weekend to June 10.

== See also ==
- List of municipalities in Almería
