= Velez =

Velez may refer to:

== People ==
- Vélez (name), a Spanish surname, including a list of people with the name

== Places ==
- Vélez de Benaudalla, Spain
- Vélez Sársfield (barrio), Buenos Aires, Argentina
- Vélez-Blanco, Spain
- Vélez-Málaga, Spain
- Vélez-Rubio, Spain
- Vélez, Santander, Colombia
- Velež (mountain), Bosnia and Herzegovina
- Velez Islands (Peñón de Vélez de la Gomera)

== Sports clubs ==
- Club Atlético Vélez Sarsfield, Argentina
- FK Velež Mostar, Bosnia and Herzegovina
- Vélez CF, Spain

== Other uses ==
- Velez College, Cebu City, Philippines
