= James Blanchard Clews =

American businessman (1859–1934)

- Born: August 4, 1859; Dunkirk, New York, U.S.
- Died: December 17, 1934 (aged 75); Manhattan, New York, U.S.
- Resting place: Locust Valley Cemetery, Locust Valley, New York, U.S.
- Education: Chamberlain College
- Spouses: Leta Nichols Livingston (m. 1908; died 1919) Mary Ann Payne (m. 1926)
- Children: 1
- Relatives: Henry Clews (uncle); Henry Clews Jr. (cousin); Elsie Clews Parsons (cousin)

James Blanchard Clews (August 4, 1859 – December 17, 1934) was an American railroad executive and banker.

== Early life ==
Clews was born in Dunkirk in Chautauqua County, New York on August 4, 1859. He was a son of John Clews (1826–1862) and Sabina (née Dayman) Clews (1830–1912). His older brother was John Henry Clews, who also became a banker.

His uncle was the prominent financier and author Henry Clews. Among his many cousins were Elsie Clews Parsons (wife of U.S. Representative Herbert Parsons) and artist Henry Clews Jr., who lived at the Château de la Napoule in France. His paternal grandparents were Bessie (née Kendrick) Clews and James Clews, a prosperous manufacturer of Staffordshire ware.

He graduated from Chamberlain College in Randolph, New York in 1888.

== Career ==
He received his business training in the general offices of the Red Line Transit Company and of the Union Steamboat Company of Buffalo, New York where he learned the railroad and transportation business. He later became president of the Toledo, Ann Arbor and Northern Michigan Railway Company during its reorganization. He served as chairman of the Ontario and Western Railroad Stockholder's Committee, which succeeded in dissolving the Voting Trust after years of failed attempts. He served as chairman of the board of the Standard Cordage, president of the Cannabis Manufacturing Company, director of the Irving Publishing Company and the New Amsterdam Casualty Company. He was also a trustee of the East River Savings Institution and a governor of the Northwest Dispensary.

He became a partner in his uncle's financial firm known as Henry Clews & Co. After the death of his uncle Henry in 1923, he succeeded as senior partner of Henry Clews & Co., located at 15 Broad Street in lower Manhattan.

== Personal life ==
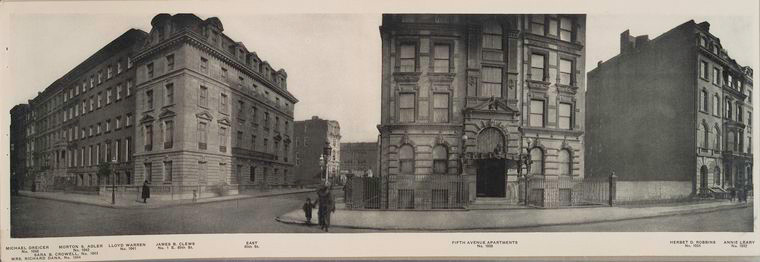
Clew's New York City residence at 1039 Fifth Avenue.

In November 1908, Clews was married to Leta Alicia (née Nichols) Livingston (1865–1919) at Bernardsville, New Jersey. Leta, the widow of Oscar Frederick Livingston (1824–1901), was a daughter of Washington Romaine Nichols and Alicia (née MacKay) Nichols and a great-granddaughter of General Benjamin Romaine of prison ship martyr fame. Together, James and Leta lived at 1039 Fifth Avenue, and were the parents of:

- Leta Clews (1912–1991), who married Seymour LeGrand Cromwell Jr. (1902–1965), a son of Seymour L. Cromwell (a former president of the New York Stock Exchange), in 1936. Leta Cromwell was a resident and philanthropist in St. Thomas, U.S.V.I.

After the death of his first wife, he married Mary Ann Payne (1890–1973), a daughter of Mrs. Edward Raphael Payne of Baltimore, in the White and Gold Room at the Plaza Hotel in New York City on October 2, 1926. Mary Ann was a direct descendant of Sir Robert Payne, one of the first settlers of Virginia. They owned a summer home, La Lanterne in Brookville on Long Island.

Clews died at his home, 1 East 62nd Street in Manhattan on December 17, 1934. After a funeral at St. Bartholomew's in New York, he was buried at Locust Valley Cemetery in Locust Valley, New York. After his death, his widow married George Blumenthal, a banker and president of the Metropolitan Museum of Art. After Blumenthal died in 1941, she married Gen. Ralph K. Robertson. After Robertson died in 1964, she married Russian Baron Charles P. von Wrangell-Rokassowsky in 1968 before her death in 1973 at the age of 84.
