= Patio from the Castle of Vélez Blanco =

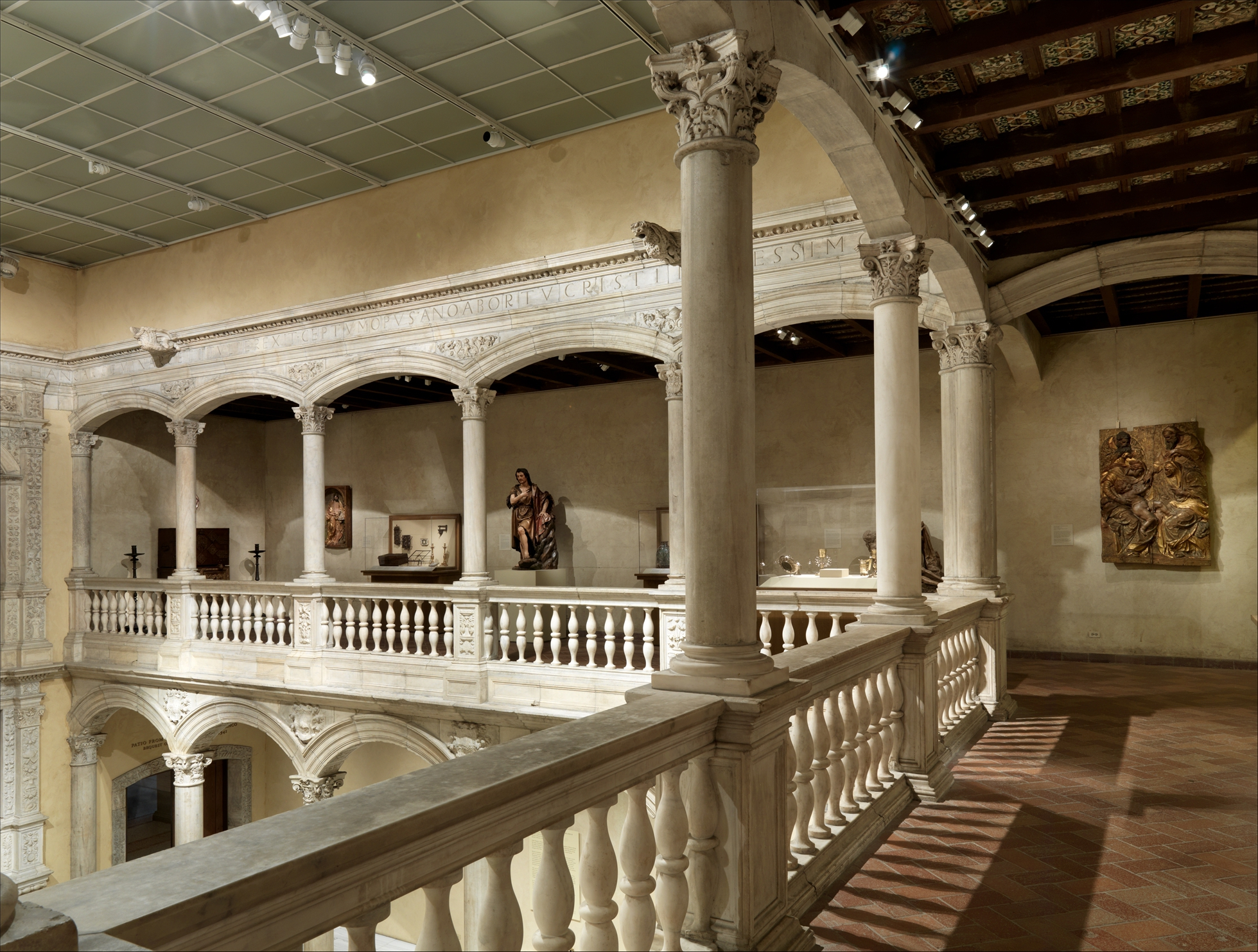
- Completion date: 1515
- Dimensions: 33 ft (10 m) × 44 ft (13 m) × 63 ft (19 m)
- Location: Metropolitan Museum of Art, Spain
- Accession no.: 41.190.482
- Identifiers: The Met object ID: 199003

Patio from the Castle of Vélez Blanco is a 1510s marble patio; an example of Spanish Renaissance architecture. It is in the collection of the Metropolitan Museum of Art. It was originally part of the Castillo de Vélez-Blanco in Vélez-Blanco, Andalusia, Spain. The patio now serves as the entrance of the museum's Thomas J. Watson Library and to showcase the museum's Italian Renaissance statues.

== Early history and creation ==
The patio was built from 1506 to 1515 for the Governor of Murcia, Pedro Fajardo, 1st Marquis of los Vélez, as part of the Castillo de Vélez-Blanco in Vélez-Blanco, Andalusia. It was crafted out of marble of Macael by Northern Italian sculptors and artisans. After political unrest in Spain, the castle was abandoned by the early 19th century. In 1904, the castle's owners removed and sold the entire patio to a Parisian dealer, whereupon it was transported to Paris.

== Later history and display ==
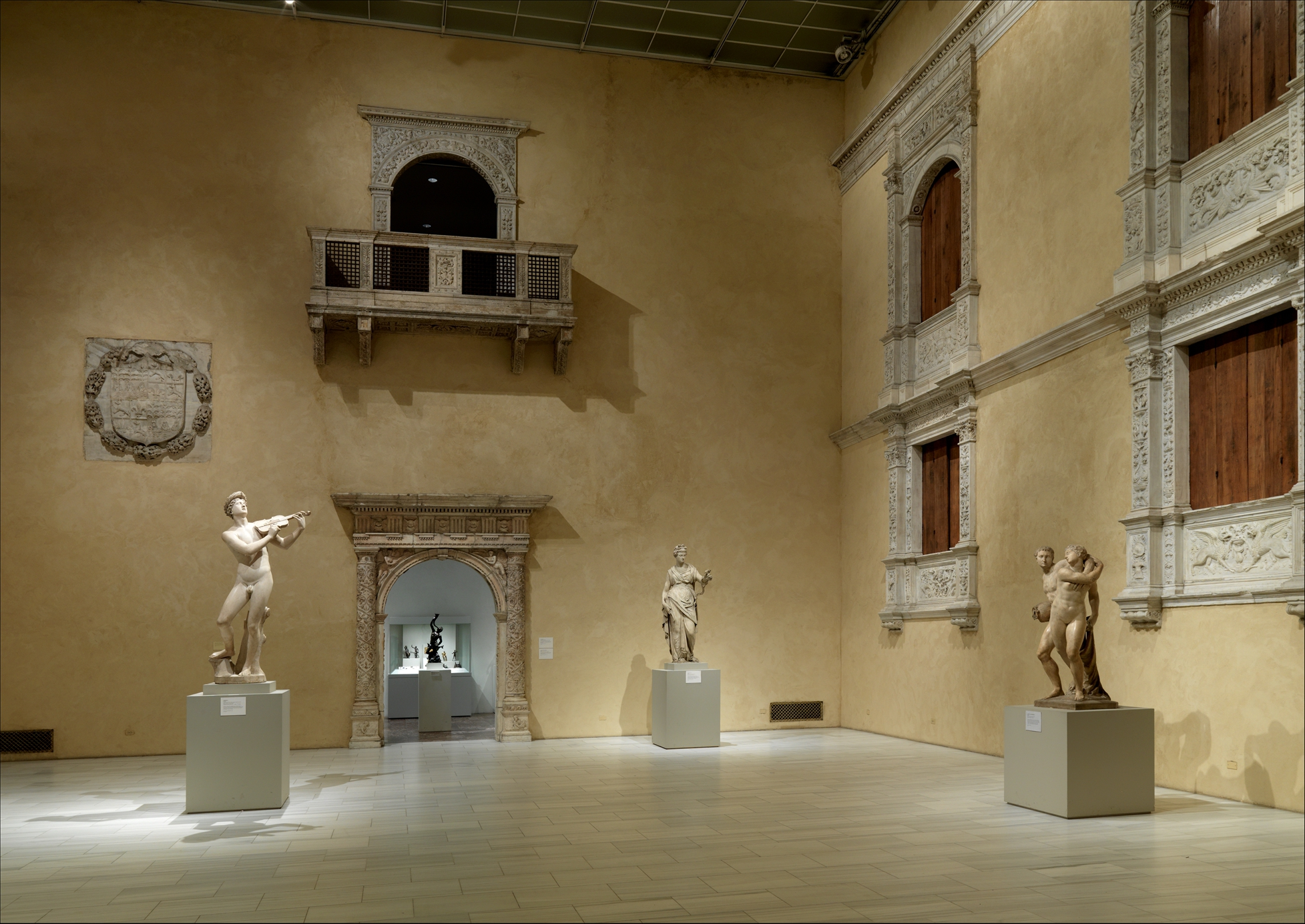
From the museum's first floor

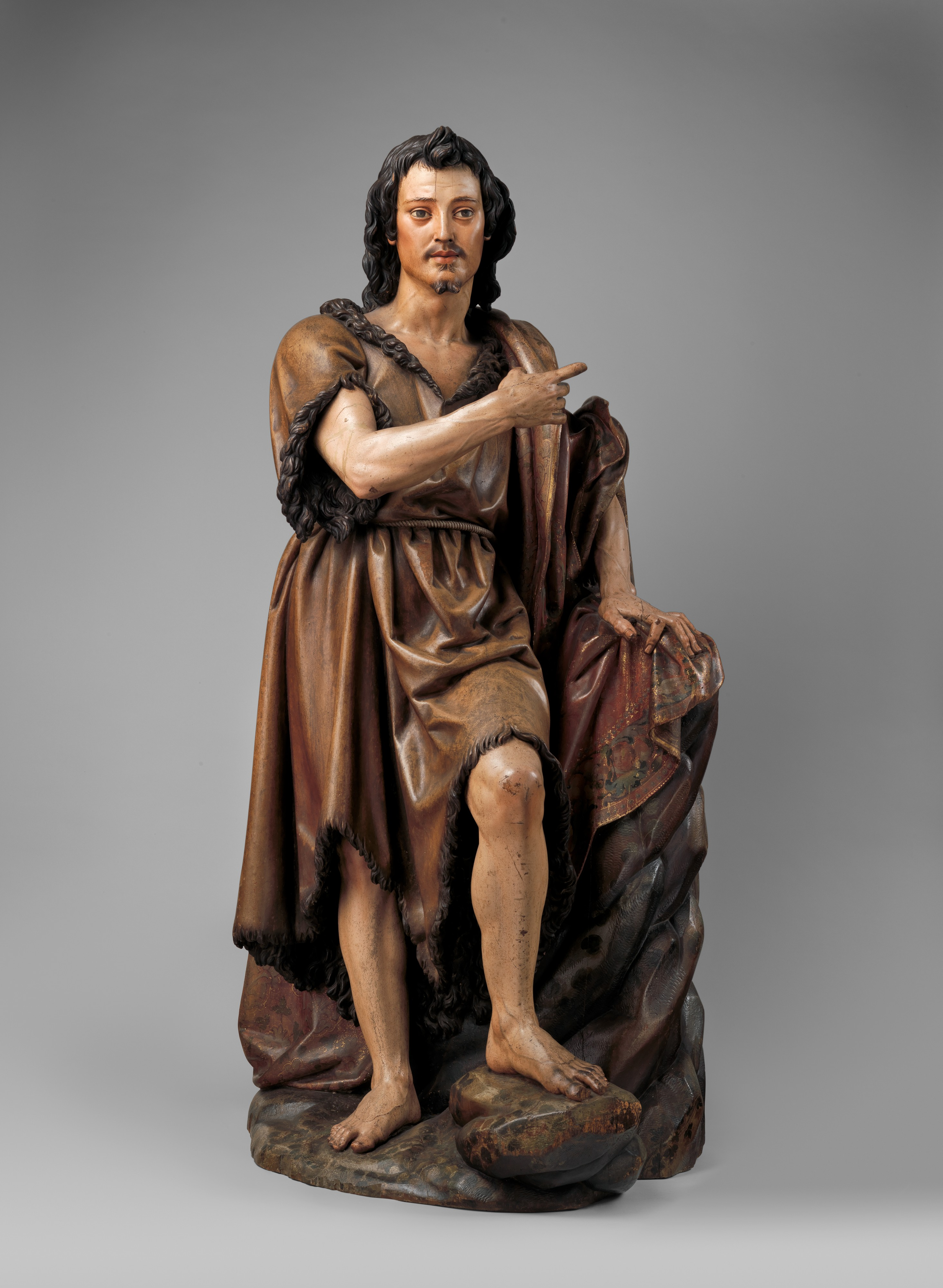
Juan Martínez Montañés' Saint John the Baptist, part of the "Sculpture and Decorative Arts of the Spanish Renaissance" exhibit

George and Florence Meyer Blumenthal purchased the patio in 1913 and initially used it as a centerpiece for their private house on Park Avenue in Manhattan. It remained there until he gifted the patio to the Metropolitan Museum of Art on the year of his death (1941), also during his tenure as president of the museum. In 1945, the patio was removed and shipped in blocks to the Met; Blumenthal's house was subsequently razed. The patio was moved into museum storage and remained there until around 1963. At that time, Olga Raggio undertook a five-year research study of the patio, and reconstructed and installed it in the museum in 1964. During the reconstruction, Raggio had two arches and other more modern elements from Blumenthal's ownership removed.

The patio now serves as the entrance of the museum's Thomas J. Watson Library and to showcase the museum's Italian Renaissance statues.

From 1997 to May 2000, the patio was closed for refurbishment, where the carvings were cleaned, extra lighting was installed, and a new floor, also of white Macael marble, was put in. The floor closely matches the original floor of the patio, and was produced in the same quarry as the stone of the patio.

The Flemish tapestry The Triumph of Fame hangs on the patio's east wall. Upon the museum's acquisition of the tapestry, it held two temporary exhibitions simultaneously within the patio, beginning on May 12, 2000. "The Forgotten Friezes from the Castle of Vélez Blanco" displayed six of ten 20-foot-long reliefs from the same castle, which were discovered at the Musée des Arts Décoratifs in Paris in 1992; the exhibit ran until February 2, 2003. The other exhibit, "Sculpture and Decorative Arts of the Spanish Renaissance", displayed 65 Spanish Renaissance sculptures and objects and ran until December 31, 2002.

== Description and interpretation ==
The work is a patio from the Castillo de Vélez-Blanco, near Almeria. It is a notable example of early sixteenth-century Spanish architecture, with an asymmetrical layout, Gothic gargoyles, low and segmental arches, and a flat-timbered ceiling. The patio's arches, the piers of the balustrade, and the doors and windows all feature intricate Renaissance details, carved by workers from Northern Italy. Motifs include flora and fauna, elaborately made yet clear in form and with a three-dimensional quality characteristic of the early Italian Renaissance. These motifs resemble those of the palazzi in Venice and its surrounding towns.

On a flat band below the cornice of the patio's second story is an inscription in Latin: "PETRUS FAGIARDUS: MARCHIO DE VELIZ PRIMUS: AC REGNI MURCIE QUINTUS PREFECTUS SUE PROSAPIE HANC ARCEM IN ARCE TITULI EREXIT: CEPTUM OPUS ANO AB ORTU CRISTI MILLESSIMO QUINGENTESSIMO SEXTO PERFECTUM ANNO QUINTODECIMO SUPRA MILESSIUM AC QUINGENTESSIMO". It translates as: "Pedro Fajardo, first Marqués of Vélez and fifth governor of the Kingdom of Murcia and his lineage, erected this castle as the castle of his title. The work was started in the year 1506 after the birth of Christ and finished in the year 1515".
