= Indalo =

Neolithic stick figure symbol

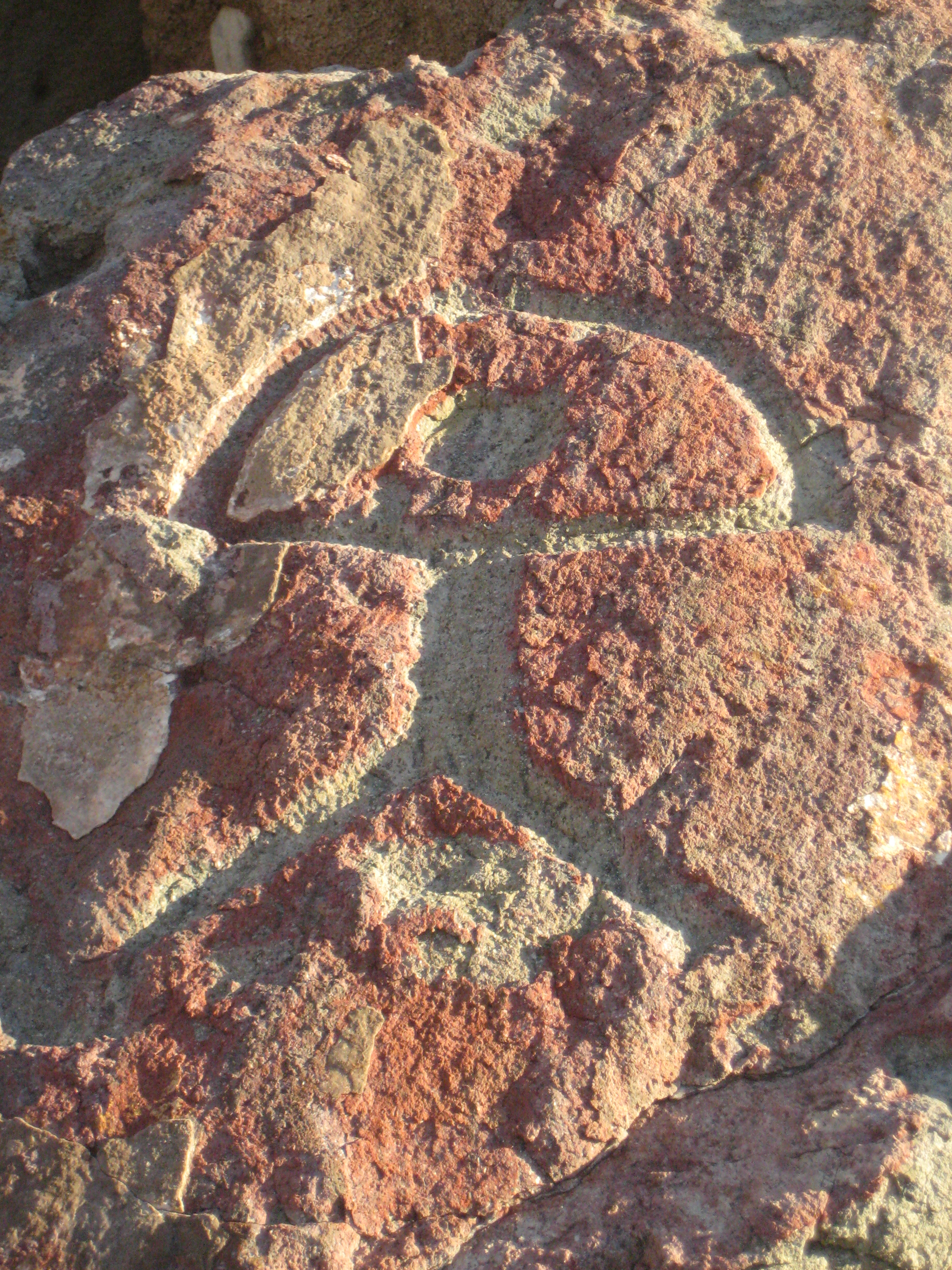
Indalo Man

The Indalo is a Bronze Age magical symbol found in the cave of "Los Letreros" ("The Signboards") in Sierra de María-Los Vélez Natural Park in Vélez Blanco, Almería, Andalusia, Spain. It has been customary to paint the Indalo symbol on the front of houses and businesses to protect them from evil, and it is considered to be a god totem. The indalo has its origin in the Levante, Spain and dates back to 2500 BC. The pictograph was named in memory of Saint Indaletius.

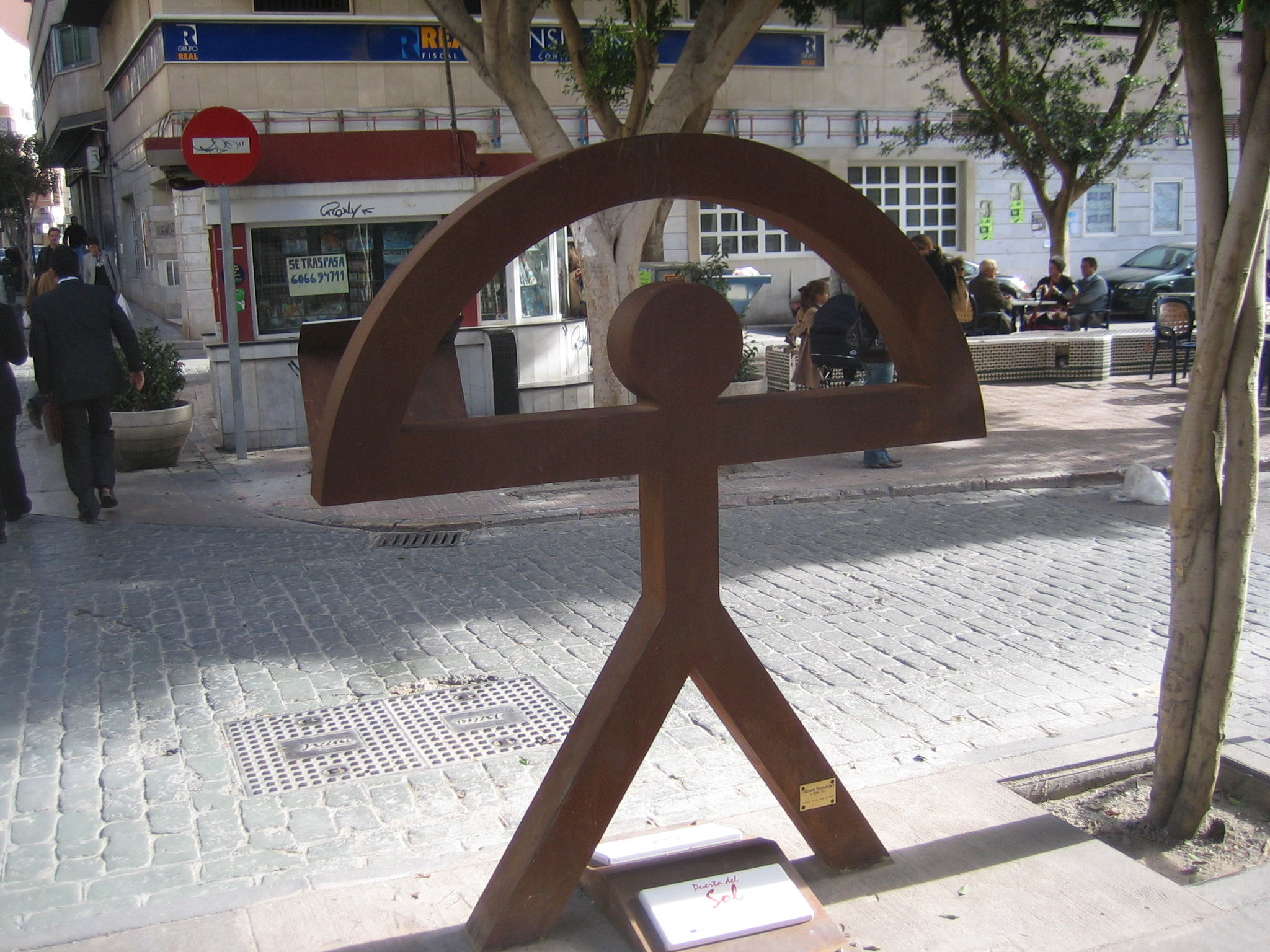
Sculpture of the man of Indalo in Almería

Legend has it that the Indalo was a ghost that could hold and carry a rainbow in his hands (thus the arch over the head of the man). The Indalo has been adopted as the official symbol of the province of Almería, Spain. The Indalo symbol is used as a lucky charm in the Almería region also. To carry the charm is only beneficial if it has been presented as a gift. A story believed by some to be behind the symbol of the Indalo man, is that of a man taking shelter in a cave from the rain; when the rain stops, out comes a rainbow, and when the man walks away from the wall of the cave, the image is left there.
