= Castillo de Vélez-Blanco =

Castle in Andalusia, Spain

Coordinates: 37.690556°N 2.098056°W

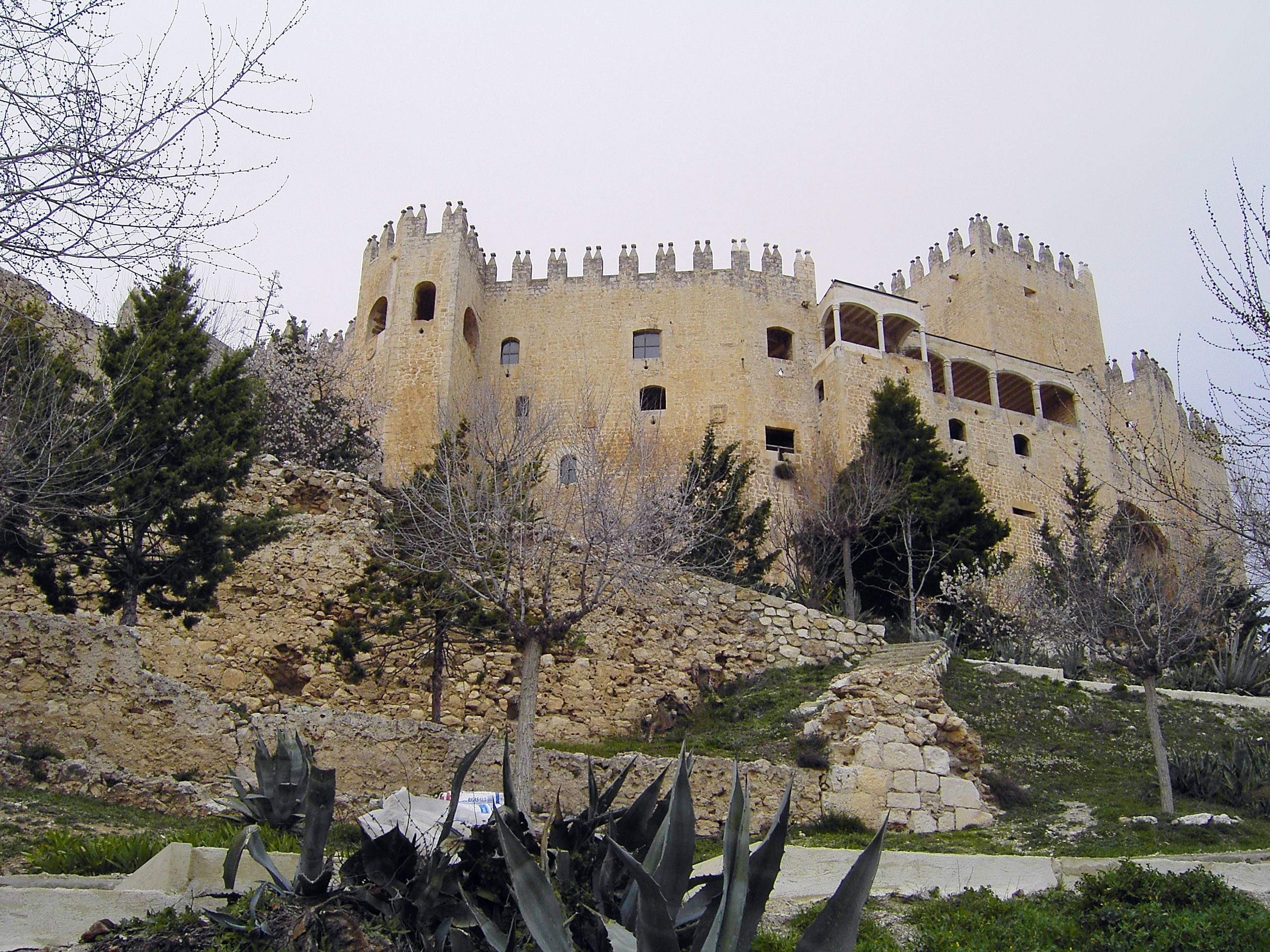
Castillo de Vélez-Blanco

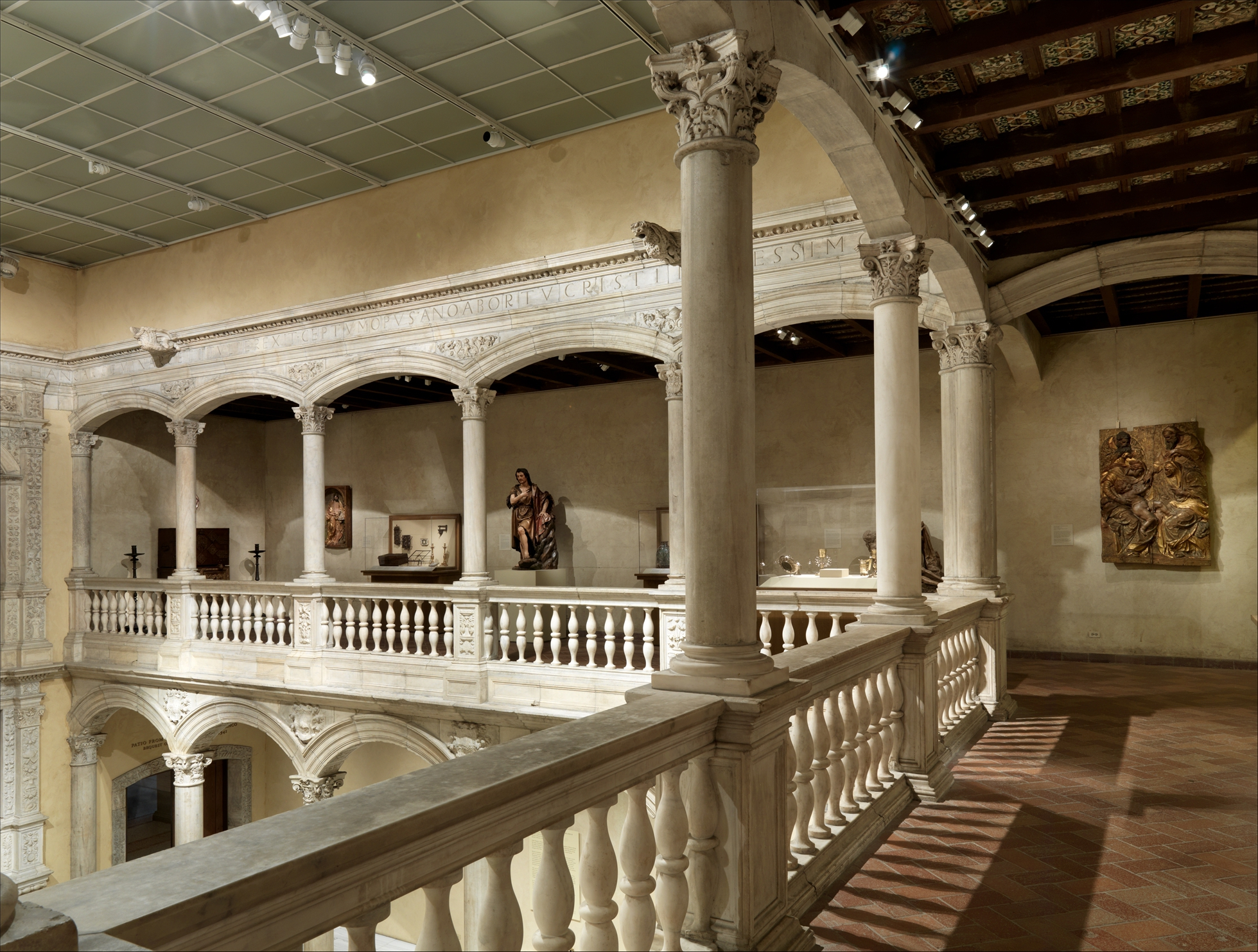
Patio from the Castle of Vélez Blanco, currently in the Metropolitan Museum of Art.

Castillo de Vélez-Blanco is a remarkable example of Spanish Renaissance Castle. It is located in the town of Vélez-Blanco, province of Almería, in the autonomous community of Andalusia, Spain.

== History ==
It was built by Pedro Fajardo y Chacón after being ranked as I Marquis of Los Vélez by the Catholic Monarchs after the Granada War. Works started in 1506 and finished in 1515. It has works by florentian Jacopo Florentino and Martín Milanés, who worked also in the Royal Chapel of Granada. The castle was built on the foundings of a previous moorish castle set on a hill overlooking the town and only the cistern and some of the castle walls were used for the new castle. Works started in late Gothic style, soon moving to early Renaissance and although its outside resembles a castle it was built as a refined palace in the inside.

Its most remarkable feature is the patio, preserved in the Metropolitan Museum of Art. It influenced also the near La Calahorra Castle patio build by Rodrigo Díaz de Vivar y Mendoza, 1st Marquis of Cenete and now both patios are considered the best early Renaissance examples in Spain. Today, its Torre del Homenaje keep is an outstanding feature, over 65 feet (20 m) high, an emblematic element of the castle and a symbol of the power over the wealthy aristocrat's estate. The stone structure, had wooden stairs, which could be removed in case of danger isolating the upper level as a last defense. There is a vast number of decorative elements topping its battlements.

In 1764 the Marquis of Los Velez donated a cannon for the Church of Velez Rubio church bells. The property was ever since neglected, during the Peninsular War the rich interior was the subject of looting and during the 19th century the Patio was used to store grain and reed, as found in a document kept in the Medina Sidonia Foundation library.

In 1931 it was listed as a Spanish Bien de Interés Cultural monument. The building has been restored in stages during the second half of the 20th century, including the floors of the towers. In the early 20th century its valuables were sold by its owners mainly to French antique dealers. Since 1945 the Spanish Renaissance marble patio and artesonados or Spanish ceilings are held by the Metropolitan Museum of New York after being bequested by banker George Blumenthal to the museum. In 2019 the Spanish National Research Council found that one of Blumenthal's Spanish Ceilings is now owned by the country of México and is in the Instituto Cultural Helénico of México City. Its Labours of Hercules and Thriumphs of Caesar friezes were found in 1992 in the basement of the Musée des Arts Décoratifs of Paris, where they are now exhibited.
