= Sierra de María-Los Vélez Natural Park =

Protected area in Andalusia, Spain

- Parque Natural de Sierra de María-Los Vélez
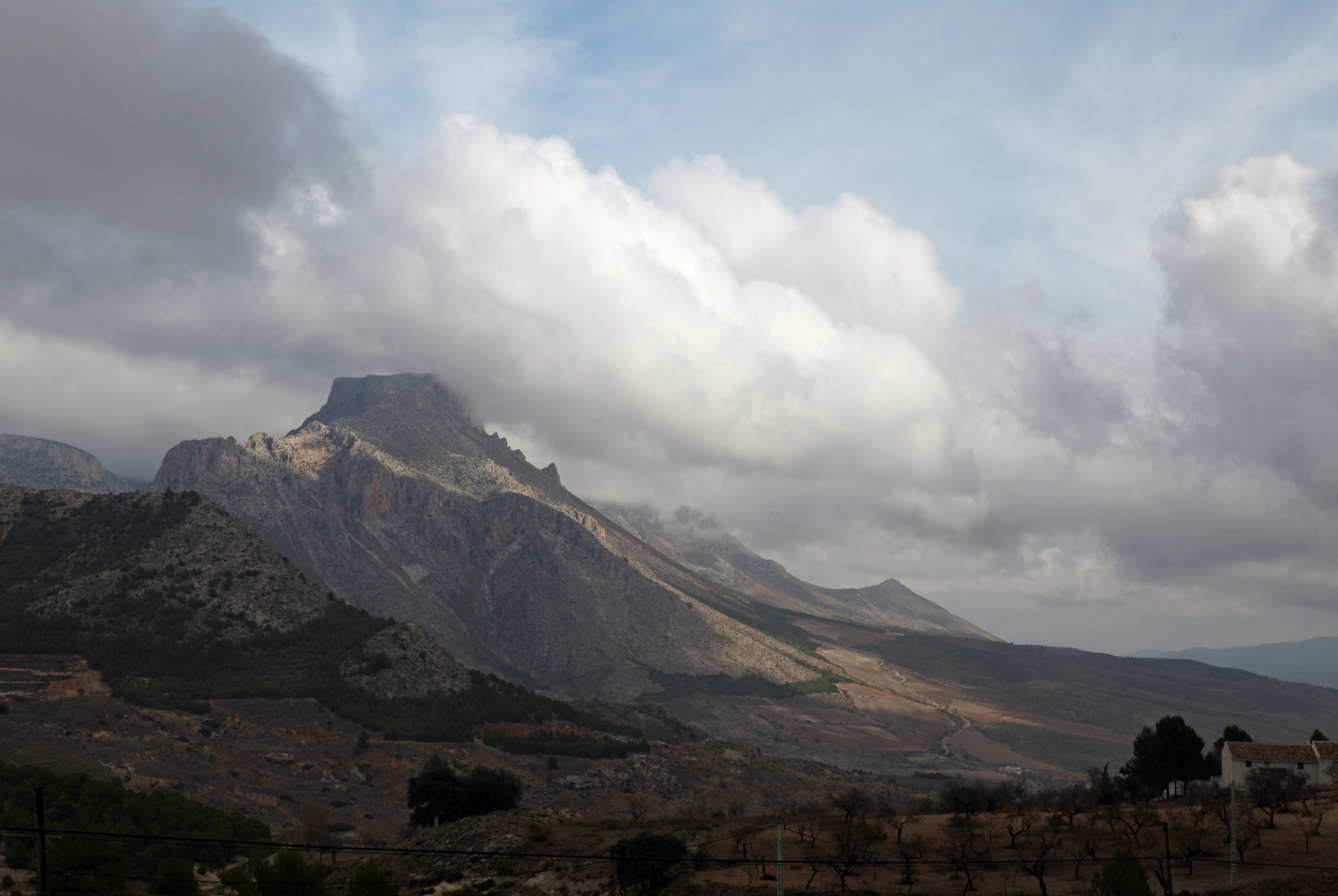

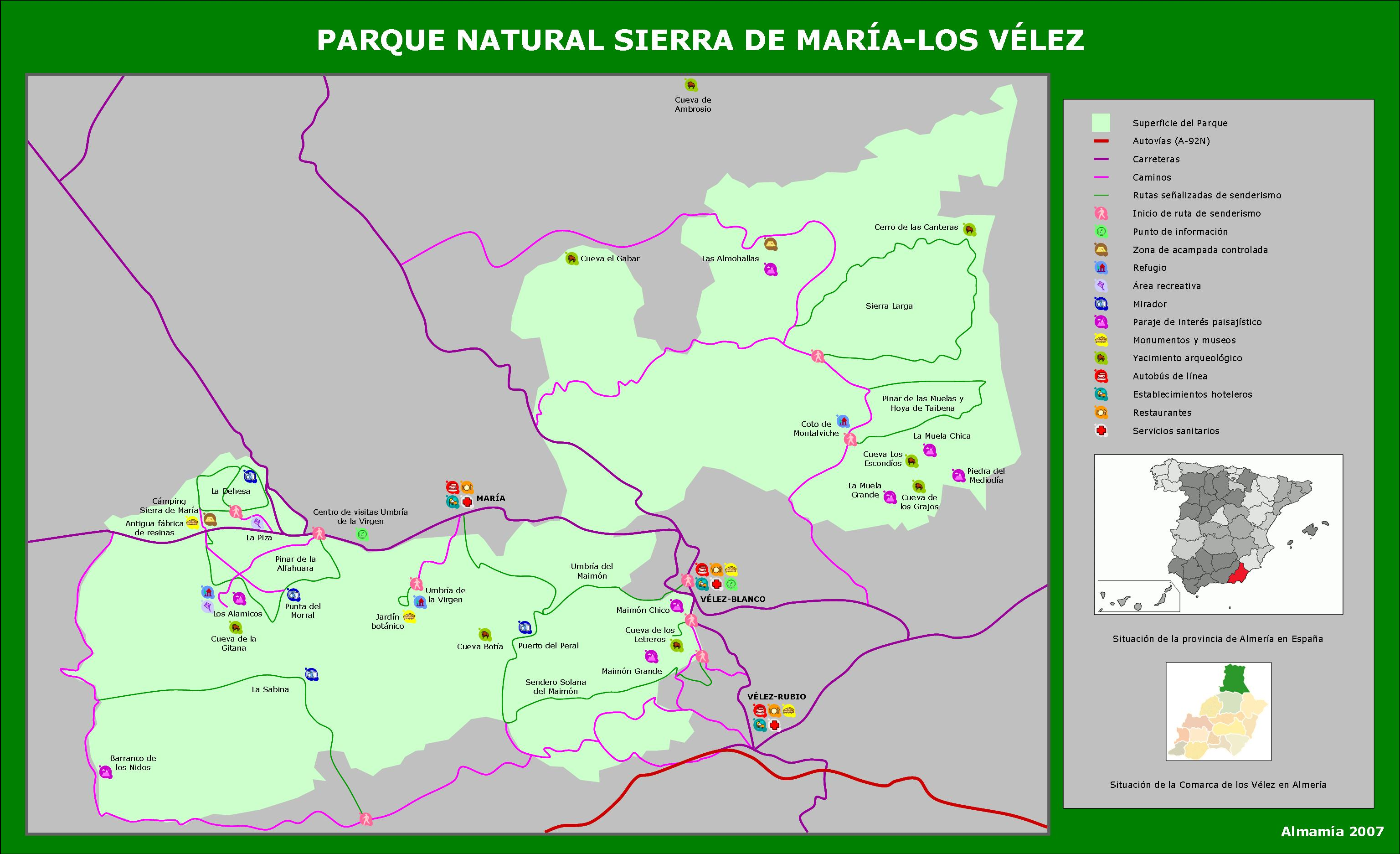
- Map of Sierra de María-Los Vélez Natural Park
- Location: Almería, Spain
- Nearest city: Vélez-Blanco
- Coordinates: 37°42′27″N 2°07′55″W
- Area: 226.7 km^{2} (87.5 sq mi)
- Established: 1987

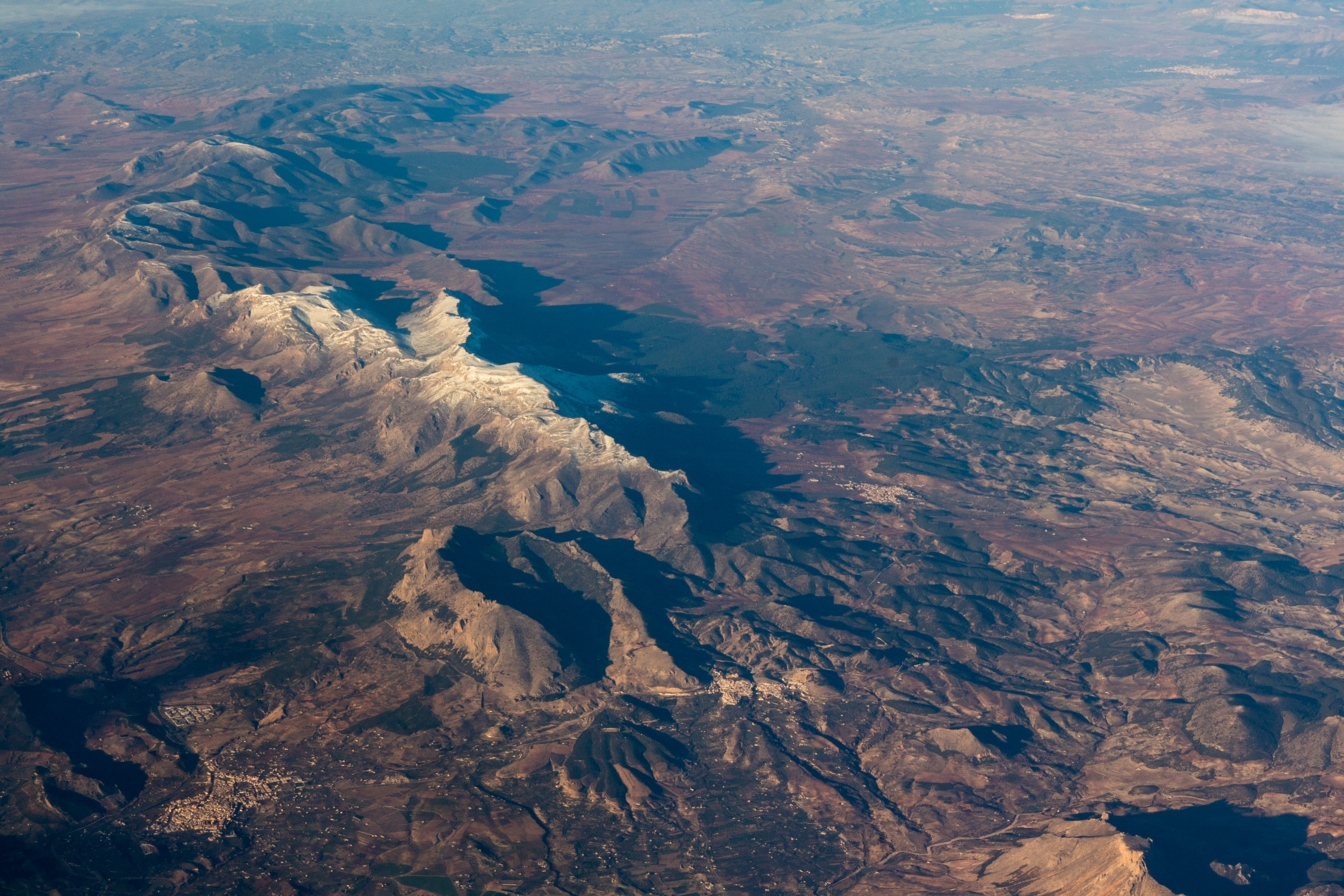
Sierra de Maria-Los Velez Natural Park - Air Photo (West Side)

Sierra de María-Los Vélez Natural Park (Parque Natural de Sierra de María-Los Vélez) is a natural park of Spain. It is situated in Almería province in the municipalities of Chirivel, Maria, Vélez-Blanco, Vélez-Rubio.

It was designated a natural park in 1987 and covers 226.7 km^{2} (87.5 sq mi). The park encompasses pine forests and supports a varied flora, including some species unique to the Sierra. Its highest peak is the María, a limestone outcrop of 2,045 metres (6,709 ft).

== Fauna ==
There are 100 bird species, including 17 species of birds of prey, and the park was declared a Special Protection Area in 2002. There is a butterfly subspecies of parnassius apollo, which is endemic to this area.

== Archaeology ==
The area was inhabited in prehistoric times, and archaeological remains from Paleolithic and Neolithic times have been excavated. Sites include:

- the Neolithic hilltop fort at Cerro de las Canteras, near the Corneras river.
- The Cueva de los Letreros (“Cave of the Signboards”), near Vélez Rubio, is famous for its cave paintings, and is part of a World Heritage Site, Rock Art of the Mediterranean Basin on the Iberian Peninsula.
- La Cueva del Gabar near Vélez-Blanco also has cave paintings.
