= Volos (disambiguation) =

Volos is a port city in Thessaly, Greece.

Volos may also refer to:

- Gulf of Volos
- Veles (god), East European god
- SS Volos, several steamships
- Andrei Volos, Russian writer

== See also ==
- Volo (disambiguation)
- Veles (disambiguation)
