= Henry Clews Jr. =

American-born artist (1876–1937)

- Born: April 23, 1876; New York City, U.S.
- Died: July 28, 1937 (aged 61); Lausanne, Switzerland
- Education: Amherst College; Columbia University; Leibniz University Hannover
- Spouses: Louise Hollingsworth Morris (m. 1901, divorced) Marie Elsie Whelan (m. 1914)
- Children: 3, including Louise Timpson
- Parent(s): Henry Clews; Lucy Madison Worthington
- Relatives: Elsie Clews Parsons (sister); Ian Campbell, 12th Duke of Argyll (grandson); James Blanchard Clews (cousin)

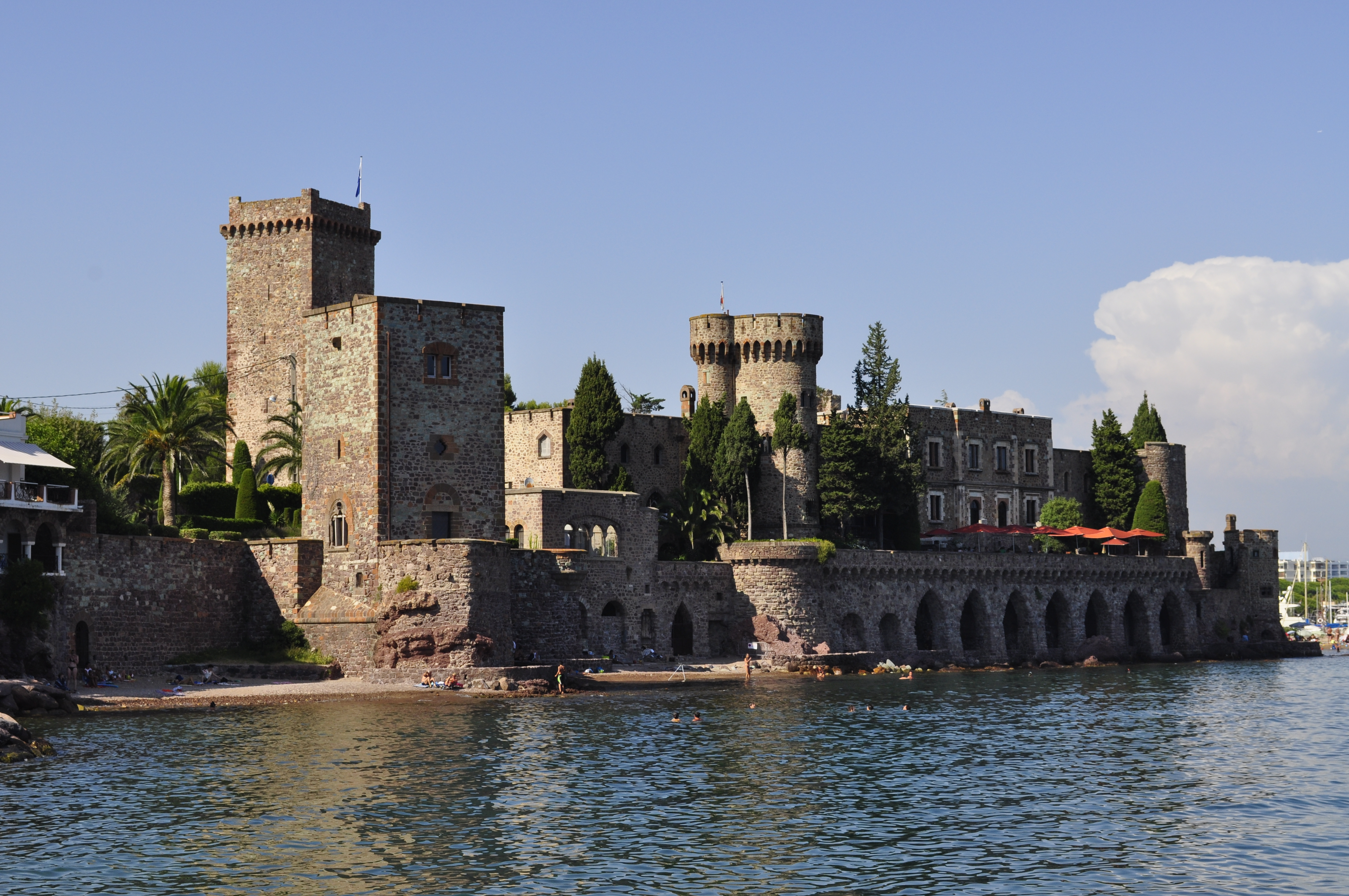
Château de la Napoule, residence of Henry Clews Jr.

Henry Clews Jr. (April 23, 1876 – July 28, 1937) was an American-born artist who moved to France in 1914 in search of greater artistic freedom. He is known for the reconstruction of a Mediterranean waterfront chateau on the French Riviera a few miles west of Cannes, known as the Château de la Napoule, which today is operated by a trust and is open to the public. Together with his American wife, Elsie Whelan Goelet Clews, Clews began rebuilding the medieval fortress in 1918; the couple continued the fantasy-themed construction for the rest of their lives.

The main building included an artist's studio for Henry and an adjacent seaside castle tower enclosing a lover's tomb where both Henry and Marie are laid to rest in side-by-side stone caskets.

== Early life ==
Clews was born on April 23, 1876, in New York City to a reputable New York family that was well-connected in Newport society. He was a son of the English-born Henry Clews, a well-known and wealthy Wall Street investment banker, and Lucy Madison (née Worthington) Clews, a relative of U.S. President James Madison, and a direct descendant of American Revolutionary War brigadier general Andrew Lewis. His maternal grandfather, William H. Worthington, was a Union Army officer who died during the Civil War. One of Clews' aunts was married into the Vanderbilt family and another into the Astor family.

Clews' older sister, Dr. Elsie Clews Parsons (who married U.S. Representative Herbert Parsons), became a renowned anthropologist, author and activist, with three university degrees, including a Masters and a Doctorate from Columbia University. During the same period of time when his one-year older sister was achieving academic success, Clews himself failed at three successive universities by the time he was 20 years old, having been expelled from Amherst College, dropping out of philosophy at Columbia and then thrown out of Leibniz University Hannover in Germany.

== Career ==
Clews then joined the family financial firm under the tutelage of his father, but that business held no long-term future for his artistic sensibilities.

Clews decided to become an artist and studied sculpture under Auguste Rodin. His preferred mediums were oil paint and sculpture with smaller sculptural pieces were often rendered in limestone or porphyry while the larger sculptural pieces were commonly rendered in bronze or marble. His early art in America was not exhibited widely. There are records of at least two exhibitions in New York during 1909, both at the Fifth Avenue gallery of M. Knoedler & Company. The first exhibition was in March for two portraits and the second in November was for ten sculptures. His later art was exhibited primarily in France.

The Metropolitan Museum of Art in New York also has some records of an exhibition from May to August in 1939 after his death. The Louvre museum in Paris records a number of Clews' works in the La Fayette database of American art in France. Clews' best-recognized work is the bronze and marble sculpture entitled "God of Humormystics", the original of which is on display in the garden at Chateau de la Napoule. The American Art News of 12 February 1916 refers to this sculpture being on display in the galleries of Jacques Seligman & Co. at 750 Fifth Avenue in New York City. There is an unconfirmed report of a copy of the "God of Humormystics" being on public display somewhere in the State of Virginia, so if the report is true, the copy is likely the same one that was on display in New York in 1916. The sculpture itself was described by a critic and reviewer in 1916 as

A strange artistic production, full of odd imagery.... From a basic column of colored marble, about whose base disport three bronze amorini, one with wings and drunk, and another uplifting a wreath, rises an emaciated and strongly modelled bronze figure of an aged man, crowned with a bird's nest at whose edge two doves bill and coo. He stands on a base, bearing a woman's head and hand and a colossal frog. He holds in one hand a rose and in the other nothing. About the round base circle 18 heads, including those of the Saviour and the Virgin, and others, crowned and uncrowned, but nearly all grotesquely ugly. Inspired by the early art of the Chinese the work is a bitter satire on life, sardonic and rather horrible, if somewhat fascinating.

Another sculpture of a solitary male figure entitled "The Thinker" has been on public display in the Brookgreen Gardens in Myrtle Beach, South Carolina for nearly 80 years. Brookgreen also holds and displays several other smaller works by Clews, consistent with its mission "To collect, conserve and exhibit figurative sculpture by American artists."

Clews' art has been referenced by contemporary artists, including John Olsen in photography and Sigmund Abeles in sculpture. Abeles credits the Brookgreen Gardens display of Clews' work as being a seminal influence on choosing art and sculpture as his own life's work. A joint exhibition of both Abeles' and Clews' art entitled "Creative Encounters" ran from July to October 2012 at the Wentworth-Coolidge Commission in Portsmouth, New Hampshire.

== Personal life ==
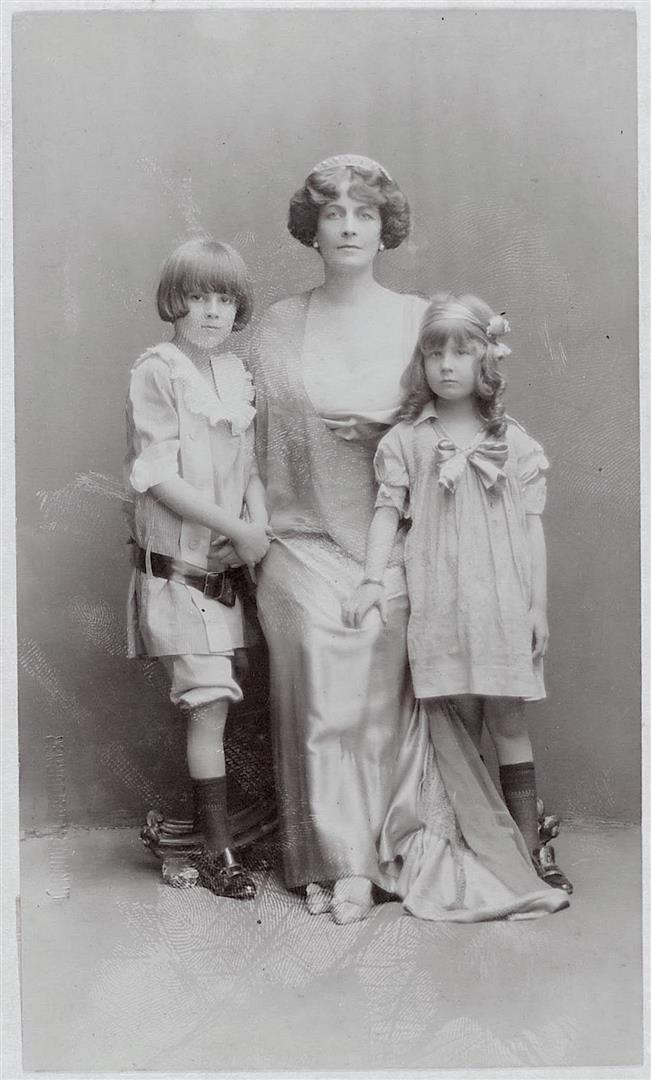
Louise Morris Gebhard

In 1901, Clews was married to a New York socialite Louise Hollingsworth (née Morris) Gebhard (1877–1936). Louise, the daughter of John Boucher Morris and Louise Kittera (née Van Dyke) Morris, was recently divorced from Frederick Gebhard. Before Henry and Louise divorced, they were the parents of:

- Henry Clews III (1903–1983)
- Louise Hollingsworth Morris Clews (1904–1970), who first married Hon. Andrew Nicholas Armstrong Vanneck (1890–1965) in 1930. They divorced in 1933 and she married Ian Campbell, 11th Duke of Argyll in 1935 and became the Duchess of Argyll. They divorced in 1951 and she remarried for the third time to Robert Clermont Livingston Timpson (1908–1988), an American investment banker, in 1954. Timpson was the grandson of John Henry Livingston of the prominent Livingston family. They moved into Grasmere, a mansion in Rhinebeck, which she later opened to the public.

Henry met his second wife, Elsie "Marie" (née Whelan) Goelet (1880–1959), at a New York social function and they married in 1914. Clews' second wife had been recently divorced from Robert Wilson Goelet, a wealthy Newport businessman from a prominent family. His sister was Mary Innes-Ker, Duchess of Roxburghe. Shortly after their marriage, the couple moved to Paris. They were the parents of one child:

- Mancha Madison Clews (1915–2006), who became an electrical engineer.

After the outbreak of World War I, they moved with their young son to the Château de la Napoule, a medieval chateau along the French Riviera. During their two decades together in residence at the chateau, in addition to the reconstruction and the creation of art, they also hosted elaborate parties for European society and American expatriates. The local villagers were not forgotten by the Clews, who built a fisherman's beach with harbour and arranged for religious services and other events on the chateau grounds for people in the town. When Henry died in 1937 the funeral procession included virtually the entire village.

== Posthumous art preservation ==
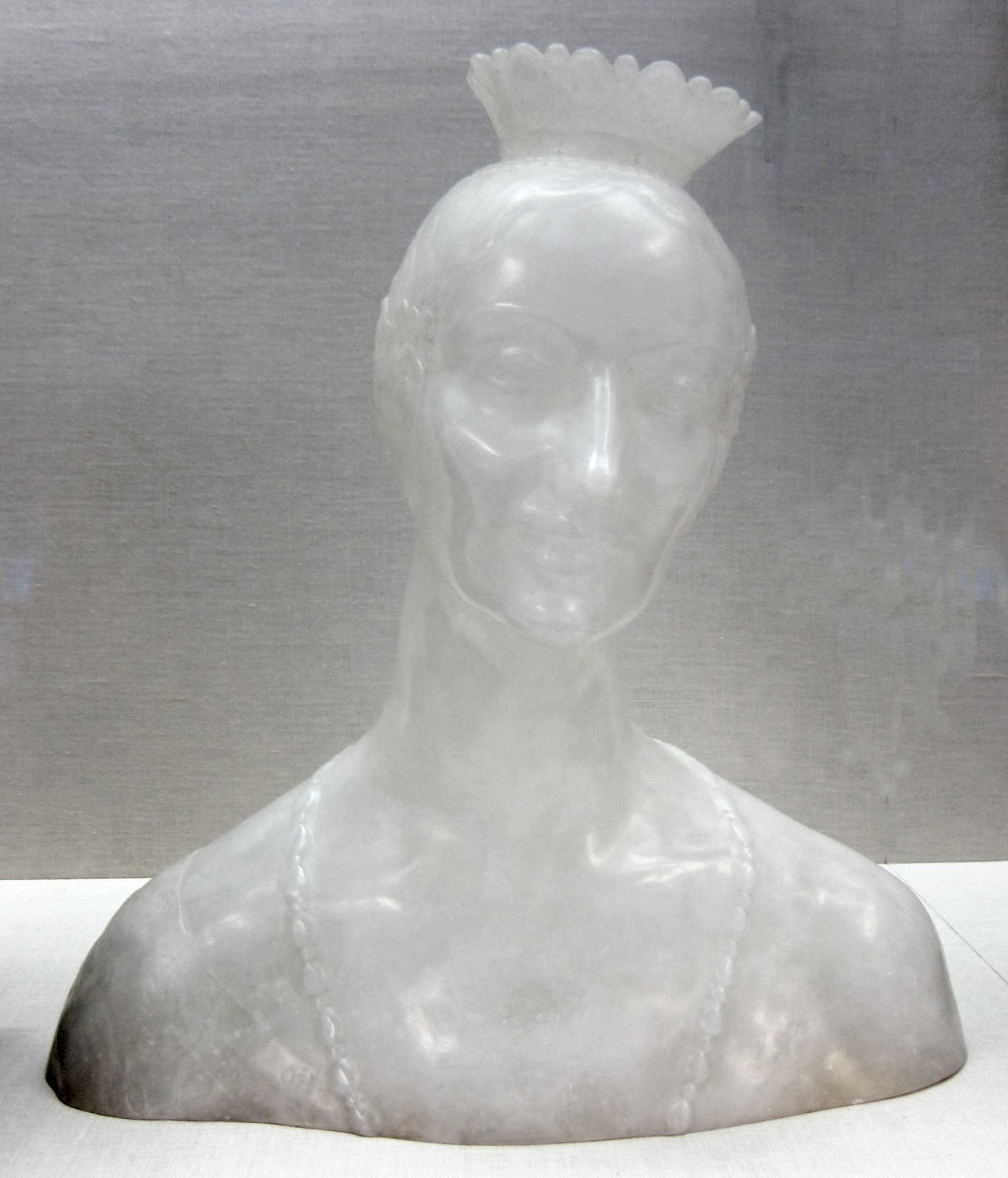
Alabaster bust of Marie Elsie Whelen Clews by Henry Clews Jr., 1917.

After Henry's death Marie struggled to stay on at the chateau during the Second World War years when Axis forces took over the grounds. Marie lived in the gatehouse and managed to preserve much of Henry's art along with chateau relics by burying them in the expansive gardens. When the Allied forces liberated the village Marie was surprised to see that the troops were led by one of her cousins, an American officer. After the war Henry's art was re-displayed at the chateau and in 1993 the facility became designated as a historic monument administered under the French Ministry of Culture. Today it is one of the leading attractions in the region and the art of Henry Clews Jr. is on continuous public exhibition.

=== In print ===
There are few surviving literary references to Clews' life and art. The most notable exception is the memoir of Marie Clews "Once Upon a Time at La Napoule" which was published post-humously in 1998 with the production efforts of Mancha Madison Clews (1915-2006), the only son of Henry and Marie. Author Lanie Goodman has written two articles about Clews. In the 2007 journal "Siennese Shredder", Clews is the subject of an article describing his "quirky, quixotic kingdom" and is characterized as a "reclusive misanthropic sculptor". In a later travel article for the Wall Street Journal, Goodman writes that "...Clews was one of many eccentric expatriates welcomed on the Riviera in the freewheeling 1920s." The French author and academician André Maurois wrote a contemporary account entitled "The Strange World of Henry Clews", which is said to have a preface written by painter Jean-Gabriel Domergue, but the volume is rare. A brief volume entitled "Henry Clews Jr., Sculptor" was published by the University of Michigan in 1953 and digitized in 2006. Clews himself is reported to have authored an unpublished autobiographical manuscript of 1023 pages in the form of a play entitled "Dinkelspieliana". One of the few items that does exist in print is a note authored by Clews on 15 March 1909 addressed to "Dear MacCameron", a reprinted copy of which accompanies the exhibition notes to the "Two Portraits" exhibition at Knoedler & Co. in New York that year. In that note, Clews opines

The artist - the poet - is a constant problem; a perplexity. He can never be satisfactorily catalogued.... The artist never really finds himself, nor does he seek to find himself.... In his earliest day dreams he instinctively knows that he has chosen the steepest, the most solitary and the most dangerous path; a path which differs from all others in that it is without resting place, guide, or goal; and that his only compensation can be found in his pangs and joys of creation. Other men may be judged by their ability, and success in skillfully penetrating a difficult or an easy close. But the artist aims at an ever receding goal, and if he be judged at all, it must be by his poetical effort of approach to the unattainable."

=== Legacy ===
The Clews Centre for the Arts operates through the La Napoule Art Foundation, an organisation founded and maintained in part by Clews' descendants. In addition to maintaining the Chateau as a museum, the foundation also offers annual residencies to artists and operates an active program of artistic classes and events. Henry and Marie Clews' "artistic and eccentric" early 20th-century lifestyle on the French Riviera is hinted at on the inside of the main entrance door to the Chateau where the estate motto is carved into the lintel: "Mirth, Myth and Mystery". On the outside of the same entrance door, greeting visitors, is the inscription in stone "Once Upon a Time…".
