= Veles =

Veles may refer to:

- Veles (god), a Slavic god
- Veles Municipality, in North Macedonia
- Veles, North Macedonia, a city, seat of the municipality, formerly called Titov Veles
- Veles Bastion, Stribog Mountains on Brabant Island, Antarctica
- Veles, singular of velites, a class of infantry in the early Roman Republic
- Veles, a genus of birds, only containing the brown nightjar
- the proper name of the exoplanet HD 75898 b

== See also ==
- Velež (mountain), south-central Herzegovina, named after the deity
- Volos (disambiguation)
- Velestovo (disambiguation)
