= Edward Worthington =

Irish-born American frontiersman, hunter, surveyor and soldier

- Born: c. 1754; Macroom, Muskerry West, County Cork, Kingdom of Ireland
- Died: 1804 (aged 50-54); New Orleans, Territory of Orleans, Louisiana Purchase, US, present-day New Orleans, Louisiana
- Resting place: Worthington Family Cemetery, Owensboro, Kentucky, US
- Occupations: frontiersman, hunter, surveyor, soldier, state militia officer
- Known for: exploring Kentucky and the Ohio River Valley and founding the fortified, Kentucky settlement, Worthington's Station
- Spouse(s): His only wife's name was documented, under many different names, including; Mary Worthington, Elizabeth Worthington, Mary Elizabeth Worthington, Betsey Worthington, Elizabeth Stephens Worthington, Mary Worthington, Elizabeth Jefferies Worthington

Edward Worthington (c. 1754–1804) was an Irish-born American frontiersman, hunter, surveyor and soldier who explored and later helped settle the Kentucky frontier. A veteran of the American Revolutionary War and the American Indian Wars, he also served as a paymaster under George Rogers Clark during the Illinois campaign. His grandson, William H. Worthington, was an officer with the 5th Iowa Volunteer Infantry Regiment during the American Civil War. Historian and author, Kathleen L. Lodwick is a direct descendant of Edward Worthington.

== Early life ==
Edward Worthington, born in Macroom, Muskerry West, County Cork, in Kingdom of Ireland, between 1750 and 1754. Worthington came from a family of four brothers and five sisters. He emigrated to the Thirteen Colonies from Ireland, in 1768, with his father, brother, Thomas, mother, sister, Ann, and several other family members, landing in Baltimore, Maryland, and staying there for some time. In 1774, Edward and his father, joined the colonial Virginia Militia, in Lord Dunmore's War, where Edward served as a private. Worthington was first recorded, as a surveyor, marking land, on Beargrass Creek, near the Ohio River, as early as 1775.

== American Revolutionary War ==
Edward Worthington was one of the defenders at McClelland's Station in Kentucky territory and was wounded in the attack by the Mingo chieftain, Pluggy, on December 29, 1776. Worthington traveled to Harrod's Town, with George Rogers Clark, the following month.

In early 1778, Edward Worthington left his wife at Harrod's Town and joined the Kentucky Militia as a captain under Colonel George Rogers Clark. With Clark and his Illinois Regiment, Virginia State Forces, Captain Worthington went down the Ohio River accompanied by thirteen pioneer families and arrived at Corn Island, now Louisville, Kentucky. At Corn Island, Colonel George Rogers Clark set up his military camp, where he recruited and trained his troops for the secret campaign to capture the Illinois Country from the British.

In 1779, Edward Worthington, still serving under Clark, participated in the siege of Fort Vincennes, in which they forced the British garrison to surrender. Edward Worthington was granted 3,234 acres (13.09 km^{2}) land for his military service, as a paymaster, during the Illinois Campaign. That same year, Edward Worthington established Worthington's Fort four miles (6 km) southeast of Danville, Kentucky. In 1780, Worthington was ordered to occupy Chickasaw Bluff, just south of the confluence of the Ohio and Mississippi Rivers and construct Fort Jefferson, to protect American interests in Illinois County, Virginia, from enemy incursions, coming up river, from the Gulf of Mexico. Fort Jefferson would be garrisoned by Virginia soldiers from Worthington's company, of the Illinois Regiment. In 1781, Captain Worthington was ordered by General Clark to withdraw his company of soldiers and abandon Fort Jefferson, which was remote and indefensible from continuous Chickasaw attacks.

== Later life and death ==
In 1804, Edward Worthington was in New Orleans, Territory of Orleans, within the Louisiana Purchase, of the US, now New Orleans, Louisiana, to conduct what turned out to be a business deal gone bad. He had filed a lawsuit in New Orleans against Dan Callaghan, who had swindled him out of a large sum of money in a land fraud scheme. Edward Worthington died from yellow fever before the case was tried, but his family continued the suit and they were awarded judgment against Callaghan according to the court documents in the Minute Book, Louisiana Court of Pleas, 1804.
