= Elsie Clews Parsons =

American anthropologist (1874–1941)

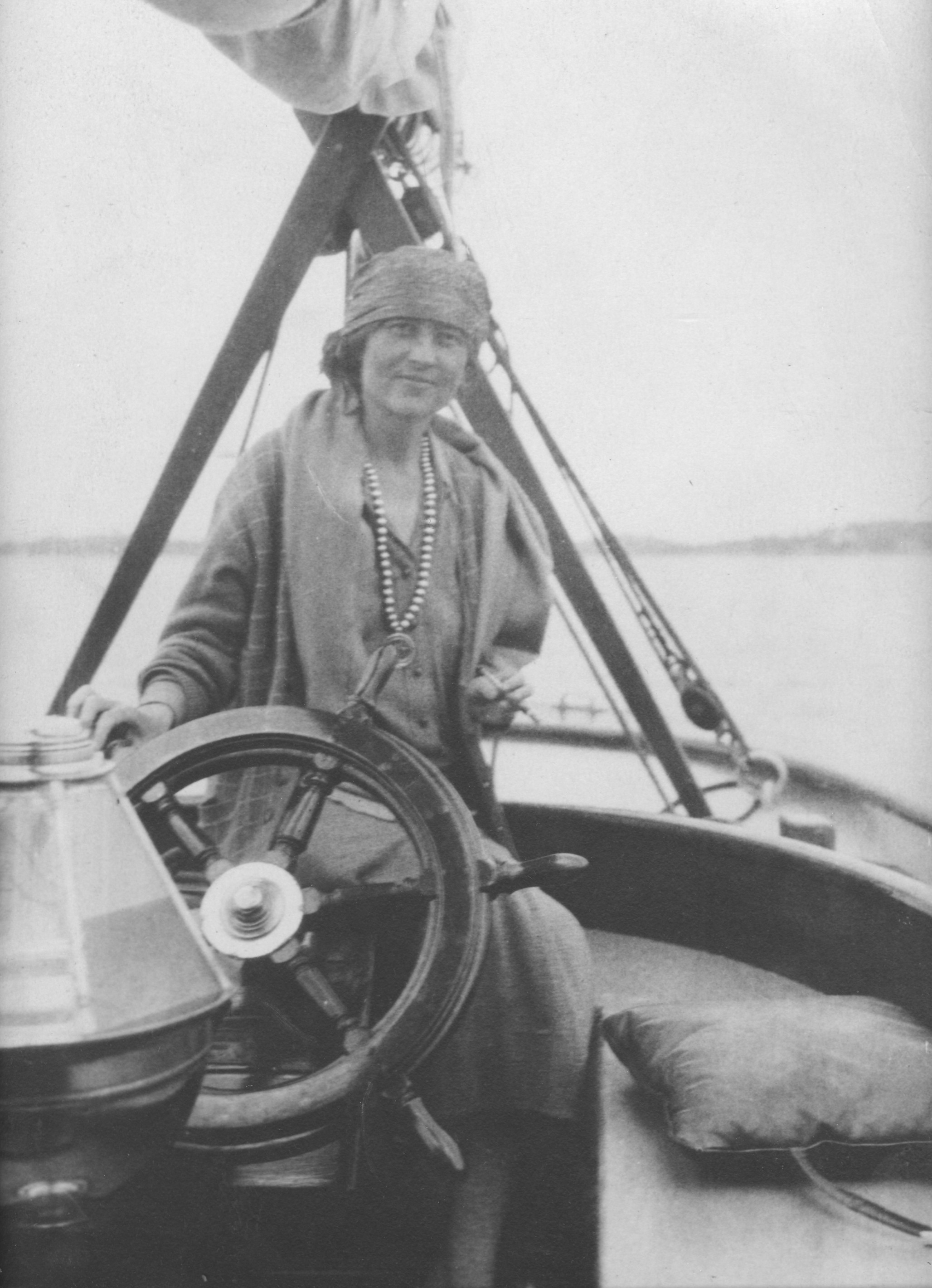
- Parsons aboard her schooner, the Malabar V.
- Born: Elsie Worthington Clews; November 27, 1874; New York City
- Died: December 19, 1941; New York City
- Education: Ph.D. in Sociology, Columbia University (1899)
- Occupation: Anthropologist
- Spouse: Herbert Parsons
- Children: Elsie ("Lissa", 1901); John Edward (1903); Herbert (1909); Henry McIlvaine ("Mac", 1911)
- Parent(s): Henry Clews, Lucy Madison Worthington
- Relatives: James Blanchard Clews (cousin)

Elsie Worthington Clews Parsons (November 27, 1875 – December 19, 1941) was an American anthropologist, sociologist, folklorist, and feminist who studied Native American tribes—such as the Tewa and Hopi—in Arizona, New Mexico, and Mexico. She helped found The New School. She was associate editor for The Journal of American Folklore (1918–1941), president of the American Folklore Society (1919–1920), president of the American Ethnological Society (1923–1925), and was elected the first female president of the American Anthropological Association (1941) right before her death.

She earned her bachelor's degree from Barnard College in 1896. She received her master's degree (1897) and Ph.D. (1899) from Columbia University.

Every other year, the American Ethnological Society awards the Elsie Clews Parsons Prize for the best graduate student essay, in her honor.

== Biography ==
Elsie Worthington Clews was the daughter of Henry Clews, a wealthy New York banker, and Lucy Madison Worthington. Her brother, Henry Clews Jr., was an artist. On September 1, 1900, in Newport, Rhode Island, she married future three-term progressive Republican congressman Herbert Parsons, an associate and political ally of President Teddy Roosevelt. When her husband was a member of Congress, she published two then-controversial books under the pseudonym John Main.

Parsons became interested in anthropology in 1910. She believed that folklore was a key to understanding a culture and that anthropology could be a vehicle for social change.

Her work Pueblo Indian Religion is considered a classic; here she gathered all her previous extensive work and that of other authors. It has, however, been criticised as having been based on intrusive and deceptive research techniques.

== Feminist ideas ==
Parsons' feminist beliefs were viewed as extremely radical for her time. She was a proponent of trial marriages, divorce by mutual consent and access to reliable contraception, which she wrote about in her book The Family (1906).

== Works ==
=== Early works of sociology ===
- The Family (1906)
- Religious Chastity (1913)
- The Old-Fashioned Woman (1913)
- Fear and Conventionality (1914)
  - Parsons, Elsie Clews (1997). Fear and Conventionality. University of Chicago Press. ISBN 978-0-226-64746-3.
- Social Freedom (1915)
- Social Rule (1916)

=== Anthropology ===
- The Social Organization of the Tewa of New Mexico (1929)
- Hopi and Zuni Ceremonialism (1933)
- Pueblo Indian Religion (1939)

=== Ethnographies ===
- Mitla: Town of the Souls (1936)
- Peguche (1945)

=== Research in folklore ===
- Folk-Lore from the Cape Verde Islands (1923)
- Folk-Lore of the Sea Islands, S.C. (1924)
- Micmac Folklore (1925)
- Folk-Lore of the Antilles, French and English (3v., 1933–1943)

=== Reprints ===
- Parsons, Elsie Clews (1992). North American Indian Life: Customs and Traditions of 23 Tribes. Dover Publications (First edition, 1922). ISBN 978-0-486-27377-8.
- Parsons, Elsie Clews (1996). Taos Tales. Dover Publications. ISBN 978-0-486-28974-8.
- Parsons, Elsie Clews (1994). Tewa Tales. University of Arizona Press. ISBN 978-0-8165-1452-6.
- Parsons, Elsie Clews (1996). Pueblo Indian Religion. 2 vols. Introductions by Ramon Gutierrez and Pauline Turner Strong. Bison Books reprint. Lincoln and London: University of Nebraska Press.

== See also ==
- Ruth Benedict
- Franz Boas
- Cape Verdean Creole
- Château de la Napoule
- History of feminism
- List of Barnard College people
- Zora Neale Hurston
- Mabel Dodge Luhan
- Margaret Mead
- Pueblo clown
- Taos Pueblo
