= George Blumenthal (banker) =

German American banker (1858–1941)

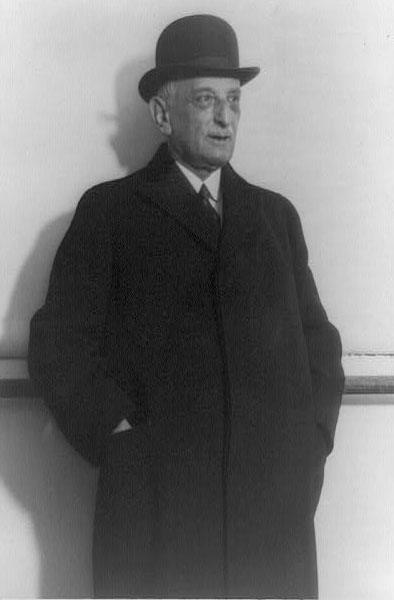

7th president of the Metropolitan Museum of Art
- In office 1934–1941
- Preceded by: William Sloane Coffin
- Succeeded by: William Church Osborn

Personal details
- Born: April 7, 1858 Frankfurt am Main, German Confederation
- Died: June 26, 1941 (aged 83) New York City, U.S.
- Spouse(s): Florence Meyer Blumenthal (m. 1898; died 1930) Mary Clews (after 1935)
- Relations: Marc E. Meyer (father-in-law); Eugene Meyer (brother-in-law)
- Occupation: Banker

George Blumenthal (April 7, 1858 – June 26, 1941) was a German-born banker who served as the head of the U.S branch of Lazard Frères.

== Early life ==
Blumenthal was born into a Jewish family in Frankfurt am Main in 1858 to Hermann Blumenthal and Helene Hickel.

== Career ==
Blumenthal a foreign-exchange banker was sent to the United States by Speyer & Co., and rose to prominence as the head of the U.S branch of Lazard Frères. He was also a partner of Lazard Frères in France. He retired from Lazard in 1901, giving up his seat on the stock exchange, and returned as a partner in 1906. He returned to the stock exchange in 1916, purchasing a seat for $63,000 (equivalent to $1,863,991 today). With J. P. Morgan the elder, he was one of five bankers who saved Grover Cleveland from giving up specie payments in 1896, with their $65,000,000 gold loans.

=== Philanthropy ===
In New York, he served as president of the Mount Sinai Hospital, where he donated $2 million and where the Blumenthal auditorium is named after him. He was a trustee of the Metropolitan Museum of Art for many years as well as president of the American Hospital of Paris. He served as the seventh president of the Metropolitan Museum of Art from 1934 until his death in 1941, where he gave $1 million and to which he bequeathed the Patio from the Castle of Vélez Blanco, a colonnaded Spanish Renaissance patio. After his death, he was succeeded by William Church Osborn.

His niece, Katharine Graham, in her memoir Personal History, described her uncle as a "difficult man with a big ego". He and Florence also named the Blumenthal Rare Book and Manuscript Library, which contains rare and illustrated books, manuscripts, Haggadot, as a resource for scholarly research.

== Personal life ==
In 1898, Blumenthal was married to Florence Meyer (1875–1930), a daughter of Marc Eugene Meyer and sister of Eugene Isaac Meyer. Together, they were the parents of one son, who died young, George Blumenthal Jr. (1899–1906).

After the death of his first wife Florence in 1930, the then 77 year old George married Marion "Mary" (née Payne) Clews (1890–1973) in December 1935. Mary, a descendant of Sir Robert Payne (one of the first settlers of Virginia), was the second wife, and widow, of banker James Blanchard Clews, a nephew of Henry Clews.

Blumenthal died at his home in New York City on June 26, 1941. His estate was valued in excess of $8,000,000 (equivalent to $175,113,122 today). After his death, his widow remarried to Brig. Gen. Ralph Kenyon Robertson in 1943. After his death, she married Baron Carl von Wrangell-Rokassowsky in 1969, becoming the Countess von Wrangell.

=== Legacy ===
George and his second wife endowed the George and Marion Blumenthal Research Scholarships awarded annually for demonstrated merit in community arts leadership by the Roski School of Fine Arts at the University of Southern California.

Cultural offices
Preceded by William Sloane Coffin	President of the Metropolitan Museum of Art; 1934-1941	Succeeded by William Church Osborn
