= Henry Clews =

British-American financier and author (1834–1923)

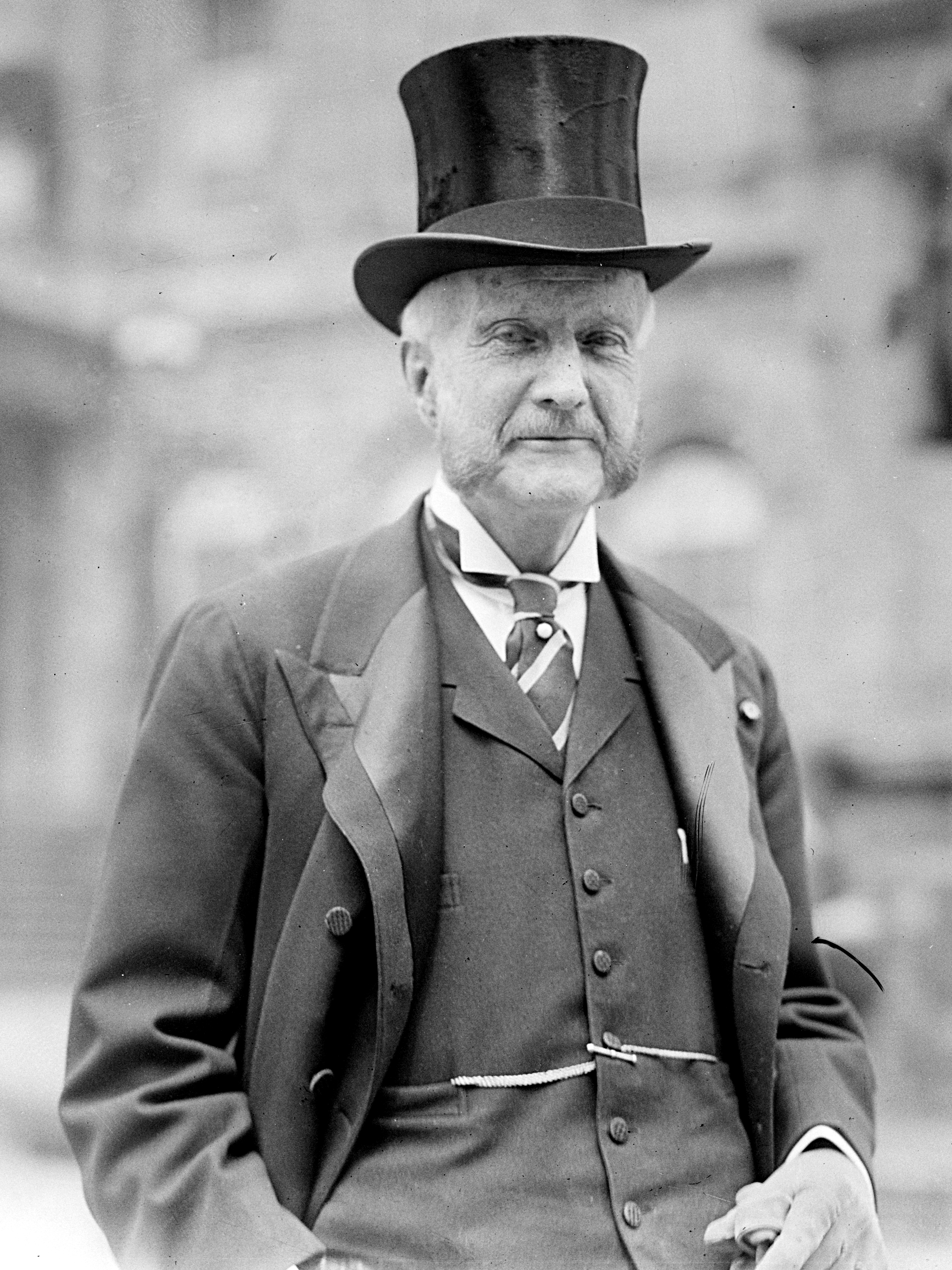
- Clews in 1913
- Born: August 14, 1834; Staffordshire, England
- Died: January 31, 1923 (aged 88); New York City, US
- Occupation: Financier
- Spouse: Lucy Madison Worthington (m. 1874)
- Children: Elsie, Henry, Jr., Robert
- Relatives: James Blanchard Clews (nephew)

Henry Clews (August 14, 1834 – January 31, 1923) was a British-American financier and author. He was an economic advisor to President Ulysses S. Grant, and a friend of Abraham Lincoln. Born in Staffordshire, England, he emigrated to the United States around 1850. He co-founded an investment company that became the second-largest marketer of federal bonds during the American Civil War. Later, he played a reformers role in New York City politics by organizing the "Committee of 70" which helped depose the corrupt Tweed Ring. In 1887 he wrote a well-known book titled "Fifty Years in Wall Street." He held conservative economic views and was hostile toward the labor union movement.

== Early life ==
Clews was born on August 14, 1834, in Staffordshire, England. He was the youngest of four sons born to Elizabeth "Bessie" (née Kendrick) Clews and James Clews, a prosperous manufacturer of Staffordshire ware.

At age 14, while in training for the Anglican Church, Clews traveled to New York City, where he "began to perceive the possibilities that presented themselves to a young man."

== Career ==
After emigrating to the United States, Clews organized the firm of Stout, Clews & Mason and eventually brought his brother James Clews over from England to help him manage a branch of the brokerage firm. In 1877, he split away from Livermore, Clews, and Company and started Henry Clews & Company, a member of the New York Stock Exchange, which made him enormously wealthy. In an 1886 article in The New York Times, his firm was referred to thusly:

They have called together a staff of assistants who for ability and character are unsurpassed, and from the senior member down to the lowest clerk they are one and all actuated by the same idea, and are untiring in their efforts to further the interest of the patrons and also that of the firm itself. The value of this co-operation on the part of employes will be readily understood when it is taken into consideration that the present business of this firm aggregates thousands of millions of dollars annually, including a general banking business and the execution of orders on the New-York Stock Exchange, New-York Produce Exchange, New-York Petroleum Exchange, and the Chicago Board of Trade, with all of which concerns this house is connected by membership, but which also necessitates the employment of a large number of brokers to aid them in their large commission business.

In politics, Clews was a Republican and organized the "Committee of 70", which deposed the corrupt ring associated with William M. Tweed in New York City. He was a friend of President Abraham Lincoln and served as an economic consultant to President Ulysses Grant. Clews, in regards to Grant & Ward, Grant's brokerage firm with Ferdinand Ward, was quoted as saying "It is marvelous how the idea of large profits when presented to the mind in a plausible light has the effect of stifling suspicion."

Towards the end of his life Clews wrote one of the most famous classics about life on Wall Street entitled "Fifty Years in Wall Street". His nephew, James Blanchard Clews (son of John Clews), succeeded as senior member of Henry Clews & Co. after the death of Clews in 1923.

== Personal life ==
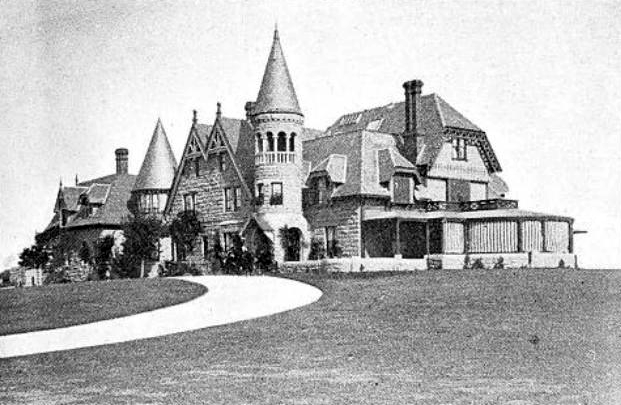
Clews' villa "The Rocks" in Newport, Rhode Island

In 1874, Clews was married to Lexington, Kentucky born heiress Lucy Madison Worthington (1851–1945). Lucy, a daughter of William Hord Worthington and Anna (née Tomlinson) Worthington, was a second cousin of U.S. President James Madison and American Revolutionary War brigadier general Andrew Lewis. Together, they were the parents of three children, two of whom lived to adulthood:

- Elsie Worthington Clews (1875–1941), an anthropologist who married U.S. Representative Herbert Parsons (1869–1925), a son of John Edward Parsons, in 1900.
- Henry Clews Jr. (1876–1937), an artist who married divorced New York socialite Louise Hollingsworth (née Morris) Gebhard (1877–1936) in 1901. They also divorced and in 1914 he married Elsie "Marie" (née Whelan) Goelet (1880–1959), the first wife of Robert Wilson Goelet. They lived at the Château de la Napoule in France.
- Robert Bower Clews (1878–1890), who died aged 12 of a cerebral hemorrhage.

Clews died of bronchitis in New York City, New York on January 31, 1923. He was buried at Woodlawn Cemetery in the Bronx. His widow died, at the age of 93, at her home, 15 East 69th Street in New York on May 19, 1945.

=== Descendants ===
Through his son Henry, Clews was the grandfather of Henry Clews III (1903–1983); Louise Hollingsworth Morris Clews (1904–1970), who married Ian Campbell, 11th Duke of Argyll and became the Duchess of Argyll; and Mancha Madison Clews (1915–2006), an electrical engineer.

== Published works ==
- Clews, Henry. The Wall Street Point of View, Silver, Burdett and Company, New York, copyright, 1900.
- Clews, Henry. Fifty Years in Wall Street. Hoboken, N.J.: J. Wiley & Sons, 2006.
