= Kathleen L. Lodwick =

American historian of China and American missions in China

- Born: February 7, 1944; St. Louis, Missouri, United States
- Died: July 7, 2022 (aged 78); Berks County, Pennsylvania, United States
- Occupations: Educator and historian of Christianity in China
- Years active: 1960s-2012
- Known for: Creation of the China Missions Group (later the China Christianity Studies Group), which contributed to the establishment of China Christianity studies as its own academic discipline
- Notable work: The Chinese Recorder Index (Rowman and Littlefield, 1986)

Kathleen L. Lodwick (February 7, 1944 – July 7, 2022) was an American educator and historian of Christianity in China during the mid-twentieth to the early twenty-first centuries. According to historian Anthony E. Clark, Lodwick "was recognized as a front-runner in the field of China missionary research," following the publication of her book, The Chinese Recorder Index (Rowman and Littlefield, 1986). Clark explained that:

"Indeed, this exhaustive endeavor is the only research guide to the mission periodicals the Chinese Recorder and Missionary Recorder, and the entries in the persons index include biographical information, denominational affiliation, spouse names, and the locations and dates of service in China. This monumental work remains among Lodwick’s most consulted and cited publications, but it is by no means her only work that researchers keep near their desks. Books such as Crusaders against Opium: Protestant Missionaries in China, 1874–1917 (Univ. Press of Kentucky, 1996) and The Widow’s Quest: The Byers Extraterritorial Case in Hainan, China, 1924–1925 (Lehigh Univ. Press, 2003) offer arguments that have had a substantial impact on how historians approach the topic of Westerners in China."

== Early life ==
Born in St. Louis, Missouri on February 7, 1944, Kathleen Lodwick was a daughter of Kathryn E. (Worthington) Lodwick and Algha C. Lodwick and a granddaughter of Edward Stephen Worthington, a direct descendant of Kentucky frontiersman Edward Worthington. She earned both her Bachelor of Arts degree in journalism and her master's degree at The Ohio State University, where she was the recipient of undergraduate and graduate scholarships. She was then awarded an East-West Center Fellowship in Honolulu, Hawaii, which funded her research between 1966 and 1968, providing one year each at the University of Hawaiʻi and at the Mandarin Center of the National Taiwan Normal University in Taipei.

She was awarded a Doctor of Philosophy degree in Chinese history by the University of Arizona, where she was also the recipient of the Ann Eve Johnson Award.

== Career ==
Early in her academic career, Lodwick was a research associate at the John King Fairbank Center for East Asian Research (now the Fairbank Center for Chinese Studies) at Harvard University in Cambridge, Massachusetts. An associate professor of history at Missouri State University in Springield by 1983, she was awarded a $69,680 grant that year by the National Endowment for the Humanities.

As a professor of history at Pennsylvania State University at the Lehigh Valley Campus of Penn State Berks-Lehigh Valley College, Lodwick taught courses on traditional, modern, and twentieth-century China.

Lodwick wrote or contributed to more than a dozen books and articles about Chinese history, and often focused on the history of missionaries in China. Her research included a history of the Nanjing Theological Seminary, and was supported by a grant from the Foundation for Theological Education.

In 1983, she launched the China Missions Group (later known as the China Christianity Studies Group), which contributed to the creation and growth of China Christianity studies as its own discipline. Awarded affiliate status with the Association for Asian Studies, the group held its meetings at AAS annual conferences for more than three decades. She served as director of the group until 2014. In addition, she was appointed as the general editor of the Studies in Christianity in China book series by the Lehigh University Press.

In 1986, she published her two-volume index to the Chinese Recorder and Missionary Journal.

Lodwick retired from Penn State in 2012.

== Death ==
Lodwick died at the age of seventy-eight in Berks County, Pennsylvania on July 7, 2022.

== Bibliography ==
- Quien es quien: A Who's Who of Spanish-heritage librarians in the United States (1976) - co-written with Arnulfo D. Trejo
- The Chinese Recorder Index: A Guide to Christian Missions in Asia, 1867-1941 (1986)
- Educating the Women of Hainan: The Career of Margaret Moninger in China, 1915-1942 (1995)
- Crusaders Against Opium: Protestant Missionaries in China, 1874-1917 (1996)
- The Widow's Quest: The Byers Extraterritorial Case in Hainan, China, 1924-1925 (2003)
- The Missionary Kaleidoscope: Portraits of Six China Missionaries (2005) - co-written with W.K. Cheng
