= SS Volos =

A number of steamships were named Volos, including:

- SS Volos (1902), a German cargo ship wrecked in 1929
- SS Volos (1922), a German cargo ship in service 1946–48
