= Velestovo =

Velestovo may refer to:

- Velestovo, Cetinje, Montenegro
- Velestovo, Ohrid, North Macedonia
