= Vélez-Rubio =

- Municipality
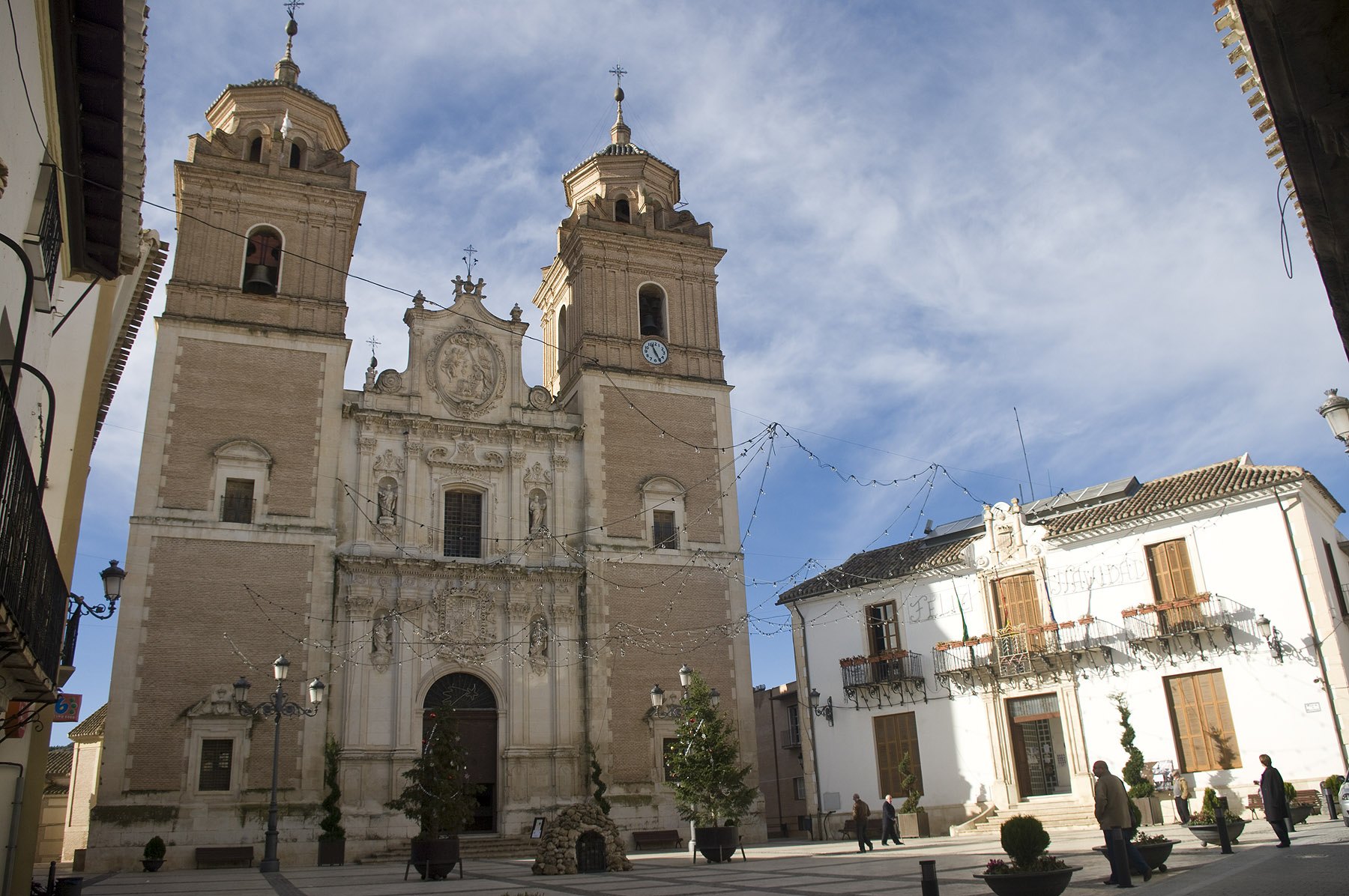
- Church of Ntra. Sra de la Encarnación

- Flag Coat of arms

- Location of Vélez-Rubio within the Province of Almería Location of Vélez-Rubio within Andalusia Location of Vélez-Rubio within Spain
- Coordinates: 37°39′N 2°04′W
- Country: Spain
- Community: Andalusia
- Province: Almería
- Comarca: Los Vélez

Government
  - Mayor: Miguel Martínez-Carlón Manchón (PP)

Area
  - Total: 282 km^{2} (109 sq mi)
- Elevation: 847 m (2,779 ft)

Population (2025-01-01)
  - Total: 6,685
  - Density: 23.7/km^{2} (61.4/sq mi)
- (INE)
- Time zone: UTC+1 (CET)
  - Summer (DST): UTC+2 (CEST)
- Website: velezrubio.es

Vélez-Rubio (Spanish: [ˈbeleθˈruβjo]) is a municipality in the province of Almería, in the autonomous community of Andalusia, Spain.

== History ==
There have been people living in the region for 30,000 years. The present location is from the 15th-16th centuries, when Moriscos and Christians came to live in the Fatín area, and expanded the town around the church and the town hall. The greatest development took place during the 18th and 19th centuries, when the straightest and largest streets, and most luxurious buildings were built.

== Main sights ==
- Church of the Virgin of the Incarnation, the most important of the province of Almeria.
- Ethnographic museum.
- The convent of the Immaculate Conception.

== Holy week ==
- Venerable Hermandad de Ntro Padre Jesús Nazareno (Venerable brotherhood of our Father Jesus from Nazareth) known as "the slaves". It was founded on the 16th century.
- Cofradía de la Santa Vera Cruz y Sangre de Cristo (brotherhood of the Jesus' Holy True Cross and Blood) known as "Christ of the Coffin".
- Tradicional Hermandad de Ntra Sra de los Dolores (Traditional brotherhood of Our Lady of the Sorrows) known as "the coffees". It was founded on the 19th century.
- Cofradía del Santísimo Cristo del Perdón y de los Afligidos (brotherhood of the Holy Christ of the Pardon and Afflicted), known as "the porcelains".

== See also ==
- List of municipalities in Almería
