= Château de la Napoule =

Museum in France

Coordinates: 43°31′24″N 6°56′35″E

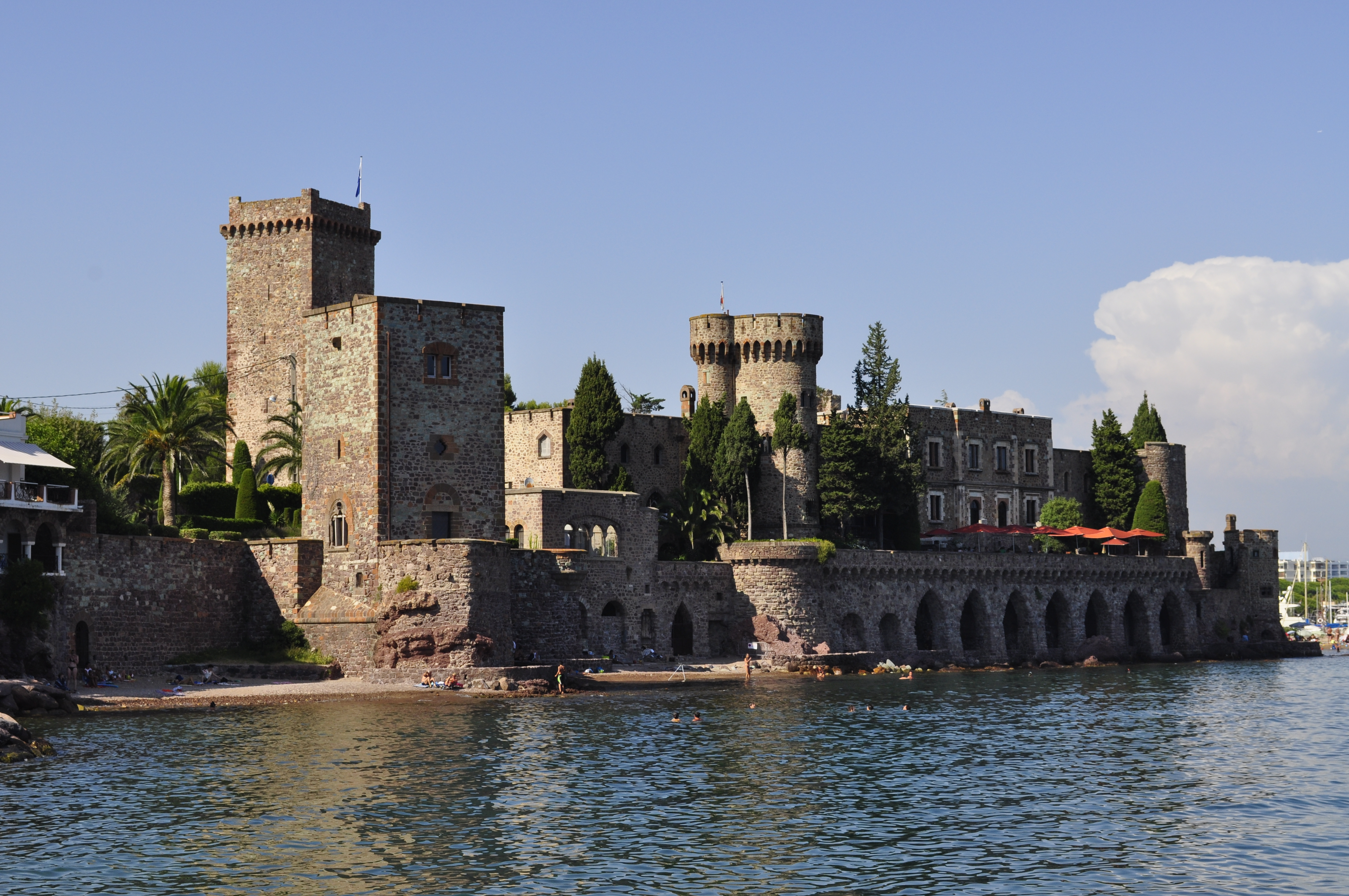
Château de la Napoule

The Château de la Napoule is a restored French castle, located in Mandelieu-la-Napoule in the Alpes-Maritimes Department of France, It has been classified as an historical landmark since 1993, and the gardens are listed by the French Ministry of Culture as among the notable gardens of France. It was featured as one of the main locations in the 1999 movie Simon Sez.

== History ==
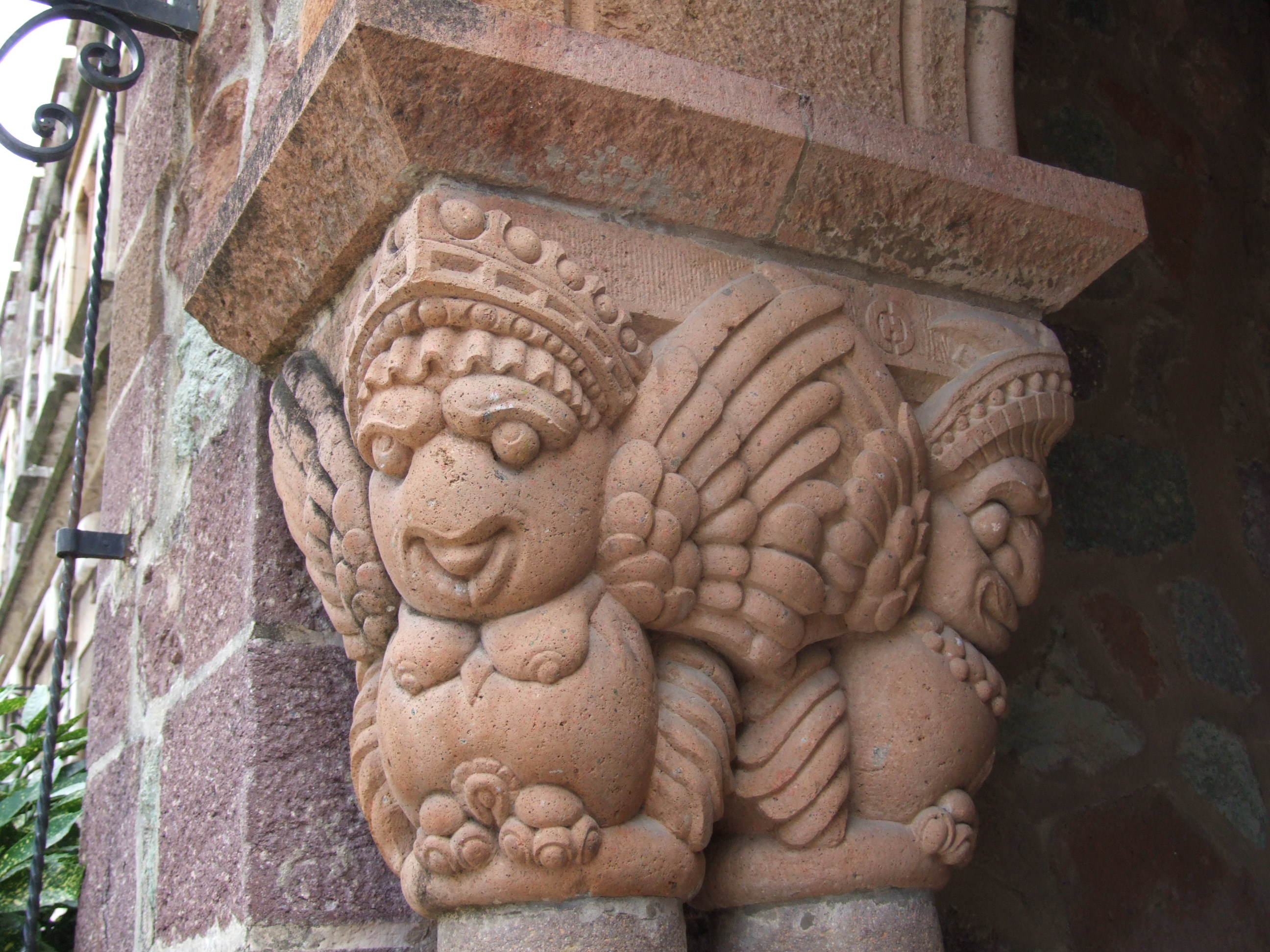
Capitals sculpted by Henry Clews Jr., Château de la Napoule

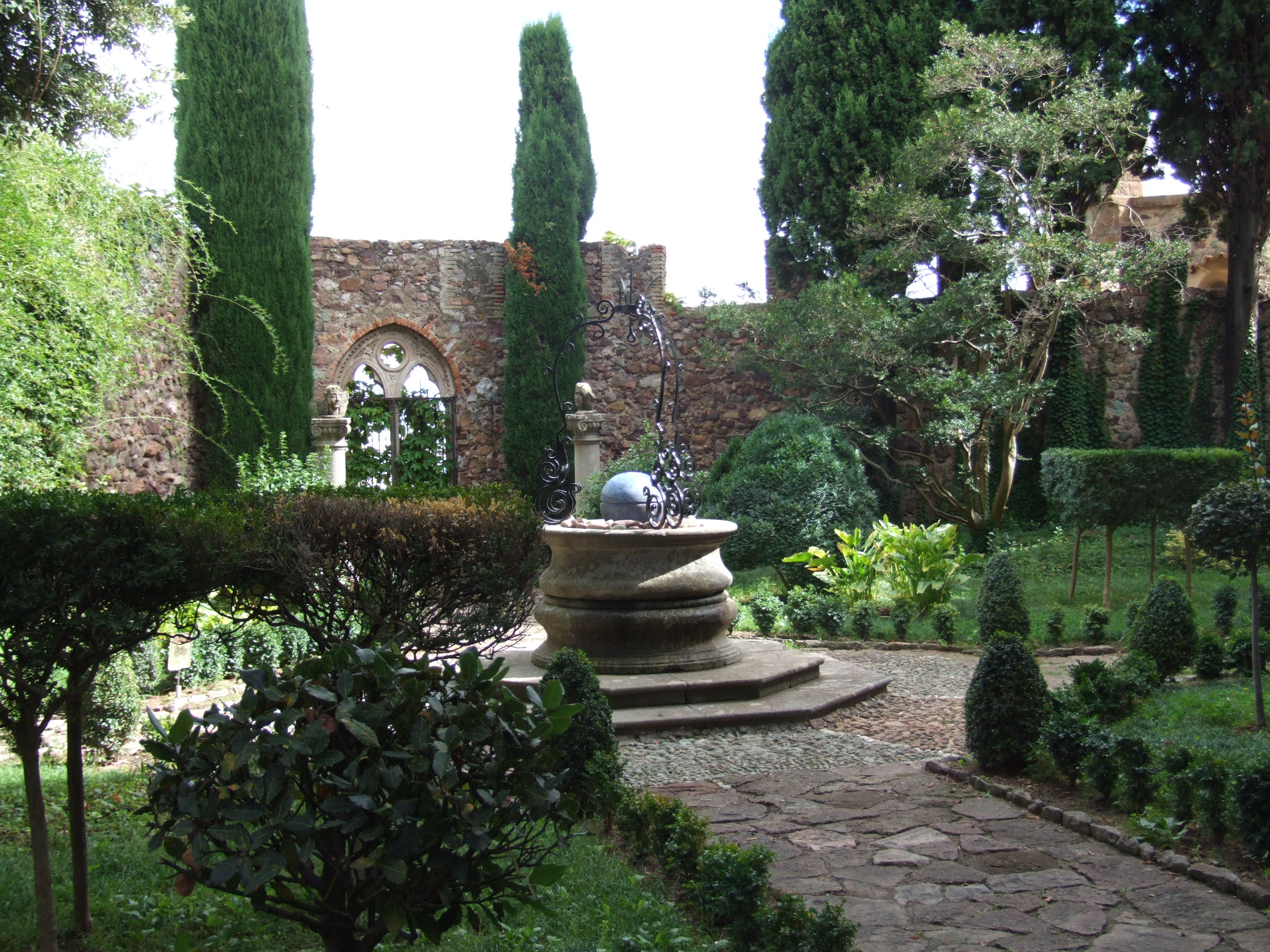
Château de la Napoule gardens

The castle was constructed in the 14th century by the Countess of Villeneuve. Over the centuries it was rebuilt several times. In the 19th century it was turned into a glass factory. In 1918, it was purchased by Americans, Henry Clews Jr. and Marie Clews (1880–1959), who restored and moved into the castle. They added additional sections in their own personal style, with sculptures by Henry Clews Jr. The castle is owned by the La Napoule Art Foundation, which was founded in 1951 by Marie Clews, and serves as a cultural centre.

After Henry's death and during the Second World War, the castle was captured by German soldiers. Marie Clews served the soldiers by acting as the maid of the castle's staff so she could stay close to her home and the memory of her husband.

== The gardens ==
When the Clewses acquired the castle, the park had cedar and eucalyptus trees, and had been abandoned for years. Marie Clews began the restoration of the gardens. The park of the castle today has elements of a garden à la française and of an English landscape garden, with a grand alley, basins, perspectives, and views of the sea. In addition, there are three smaller gardens in the Italian style: the Garden de la Mancha next to the Tower of La Mancha, under which the mausoleum of the Clews family is located; the terraces which overlook the Bay of Cannes, which are planted with cypress trees, hedges and rosemary; and the secret garden, in a corner of the walls with windows looking at the sea, with a Venetian well in the centre.

== Sources ==
This article is an edited translation from the French Wikipedia, with additional information from the site of the Committee of Parks and Gardens of the Ministry of Culture of France.
