= Vélez-Blanco =

Vélez-Blanco, Spain
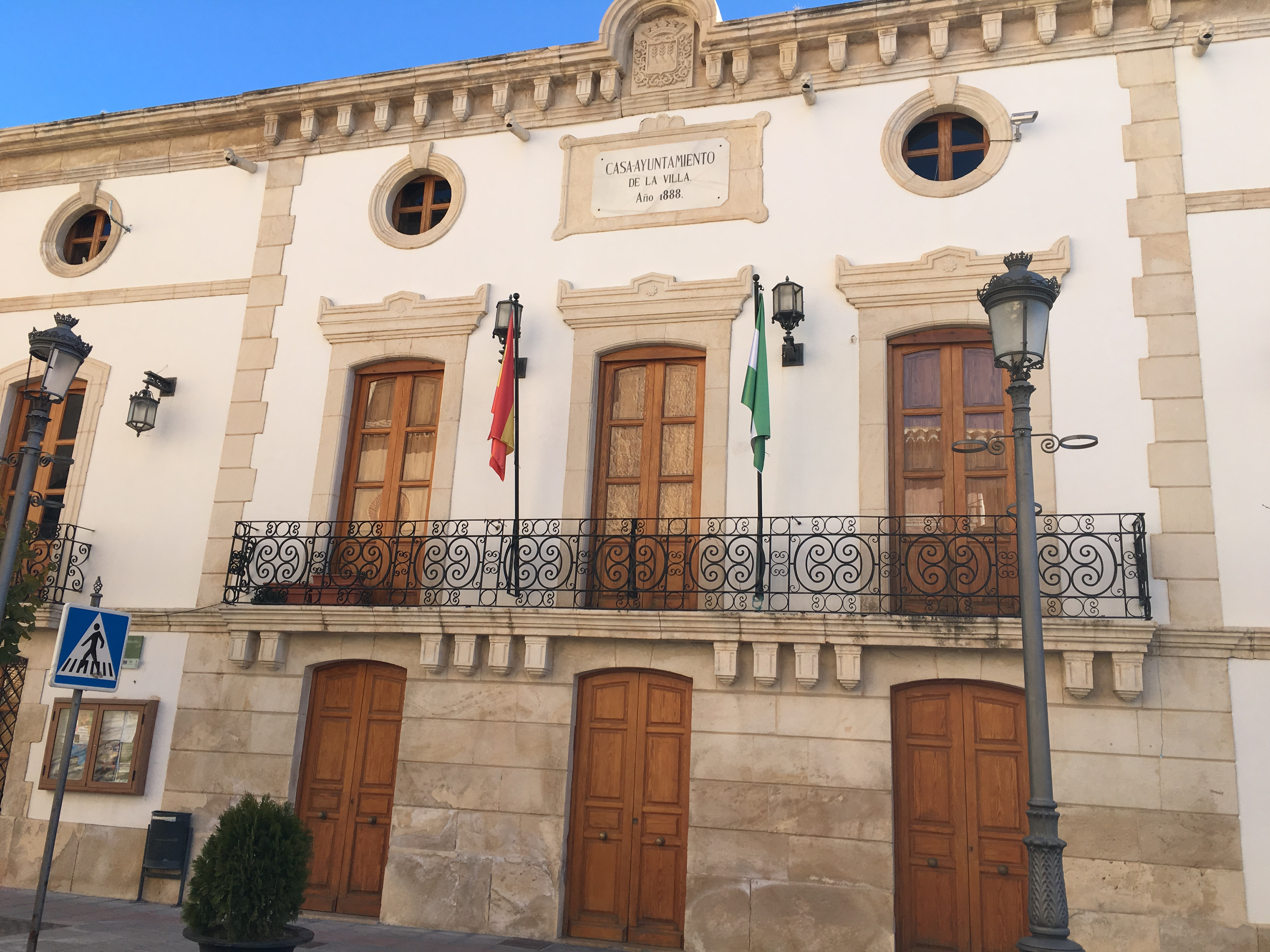
- Town hall

- Flag Coat of arms
- Interactive map of Vélez-Blanco, Spain
- Coordinates: 37°41′N 2°05′W
- Country: Spain
- Community: Andalusia
- Province: Almería

Government
  - Mayor: Pedro Luis Díaz Gil (since 2019) (PSOE)

Area
  - Total: 441 km^{2} (170 sq mi)
- Elevation: 1,070 m (3,510 ft)

Population (2025-01-01)
  - Total: 1,928
  - Density: 4.37/km^{2} (11.3/sq mi)
- Time zone: UTC+1 (CET)
  - Summer (DST): UTC+2 (CEST)

Vélez-Blanco is a municipality of Almería province, in the autonomous community of Andalusia, Spain. In 2018, the population was 1,938.

Its surface area is 441.31 square kilometres (170.39 sq mi) with a population density of 4.39 per square kilometre (11.4/sq mi). Its geographical co-ordinates are 37° 41'N 2° 05'W. It is located at an altitude of 1,070 metres (3,510 ft) and 164 kilometres (102 mi) from the provincial capital, Almeria. It belongs to the Los Vélez region.

The Castillo de Vélez-Blanco was built in the 16th century by the Fajardo. Also noteworthy are the church of Santiago, the Convent of San Luis and the Cave of the Signboards, in which is the Indalo, cave painting of the late Neolithic or Copper Age that represents a human figure, and that has become the sign from the province of Almería. The cave was declared a National Historic Monument in 1924 and later in 1998 also a UNESCO World Heritage Site. Both Vélez-Blanco and Vélez-Rubio share the same gentilicios, egetano and egetana, although this term was coined by Vélez-Blanco and, later, Vélez-Rubio adopted the same word for its inhabitants.

== Geography ==
In this municipality are the districts of Topares, El Piar and Santonge. The latter has prehistoric paintings..

=== Hydrography ===
Its abundant waters flow into the Segura River and Guadalquivir, through Cañada del Salar. According to recent studies, the stream Cañada del Salar could be considered the birth of the river Guadalquivir.

== Demographics ==
As was usual in all municipalities in the area between 1950 and 1980 there was an intense depopulation process. This process has slowed but has not stopped completely.

Historical population
Year	Pop.	±%
1999	2,144	—
2000	2,061	−3.9%
2001	2,043	−0.9%
2002	2,001	−2.1%
2003	2,052	+2.5%
2004	2,051	−0.0%
2005	2,126	+3.7%
2006	2,165	+1.8%
2007	2,219	+2.5%
2008	2,223	+0.2%
2009	2,259	+1.6%
2010	2,282	+1.0%
2011	2,276	−0.3%
2012	2,238	−1.7%
2013	2,066	−7.7%
2014	2,064	−0.1%
2015	2,035	−1.4%
2016	1,984	−2.5%
2017	1,918	−3.3%
2018	1,938	+1.0%
Source: INE (Spain)

== Landmarks ==
- Castillo de Vélez-Blanco

== History ==
The current Vélez-Blanco sits in the same place where the Muslim population was based until the thirteenth century, building a citadel on which the Castle of the Marquises de los Vélez was later built.

The Morería constitutes the most primitive nucleus, with its staggered dwellings built with the castle as the axis.

The population was surrounded by a double wall: the first covered the fortress and the mosque (present-day Magdalena Church). Between this wall and the second line is the neighborhood of La Morería. The outer walls descended from the source of the Cinco Caños (Five Pipes) to the Mesón square, bordering the streets of Palacio and Calasparra and at its conjunction is a gateway to the orchards. In the Caños de Caravaca there was a door, and from here the wall climbed up the hill to join the door of the Cinco Caños. Outside the walls were the suburbs.

In 1507, the construction of the Fajardo Castle began; for this it was necessary to demolish part of the Arab citadel and the new building stands on its foundations.

The town stretched beyond the Morería neighborhood with newer streets to house the Christian population. During the 16th century, the population extended along the hillside and through the flat areas. The Church of Santiago was built and became the axis around which the social and commercial life of the town revolved.

Another construction of great importance for urban development and the current configuration of the town, was the Convent of San Luis Obispo, ordered to be built by Don Luis Fajardo between 1601 and 1615 on the other side of the Barranco de las Fuentes. It was occupied by the Franciscan order until 1835 and, between 1916 and 1996, by the Franciscan Concepcionistas. This building soon became the polarizing center of a new population centre, which led to the construction of the barrio. This new neighborhood, an area of expansion in the eighteenth century, is organized around the axis formed by Calle San Francisco, from which, and following the topography of the land, houses were then built.

In general, Vélez-Blanco is made up of simple houses, with one or two floors, with whitewashed walls and tiled roofs. In the seventeenth and eighteenth centuries, with the population increase experienced in the town, the historic centre was finished. Its current urban structure is defined by the Vélez-Rubio - María road that crosses the town, the hill of Castillo and Las Fuentes to the west, steep slopes to the north and south, and the east is bordered by the Barranco de Canastera and one of the fountains.

== See also ==
- List of municipalities in Almería
