= Duchess of Argyll =

Title in the Peerage of the United Kingdom

The Duchess of Argyll is typically the wife of the Duke of Argyll, an extant title in the Peerage of the United Kingdom created in 1892. The Duke is also Duke of Argyll in the Peerage of Scotland, which was originally created in the 1701.

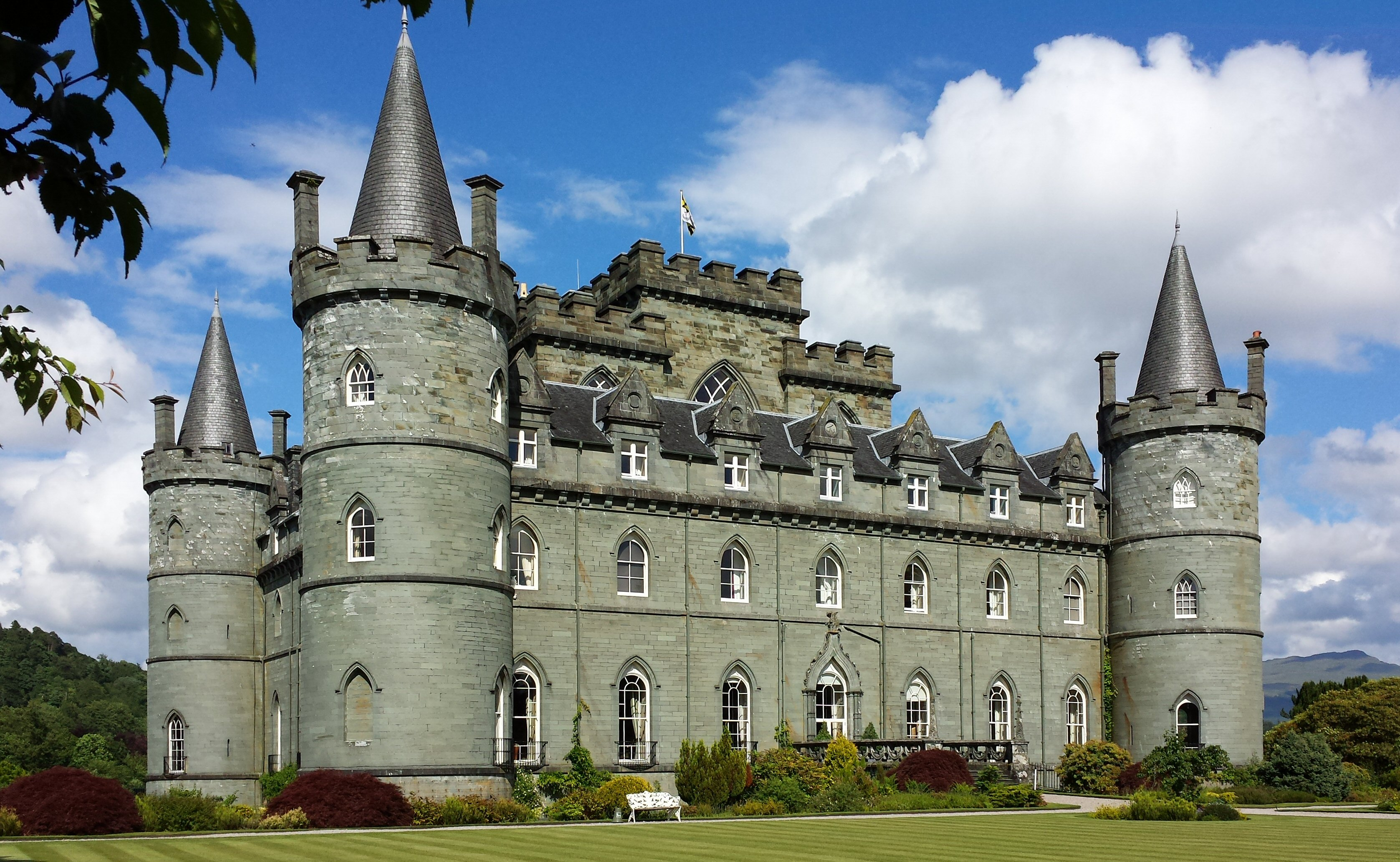
Inverary Castle - seat of the Dukes of Argyll

The family seat is Inveraray Castle near Inveraray in the county of Argyll, in western Scotland.

== Duchesses of Argyll ==
=== Peerage of Scotland (1701) ===
Name	Date of birth	Date of death	Spouse	Ref
Elizabeth Tollemache	1659	1735	Archibald Campbell, 1st Duke of Argyll	
Mary Brown		1717	John Campbell, 2nd Duke of Argyll	
Jane Warburton		1767	John Campbell, 2nd Duke of Argyll	
Anne Whitfield			Archibald Campbell, 3rd Duke of Argyll	
Mary Drummond Ker			John Campbell, 4th Duke of Argyll	
Elizabeth Gunning	1733	1790	John Campbell, 5th Duke of Argyll	
Lady Caroline Villiers	1774	1835	George Campbell, 6th Duke of Argyll	
Anne Cunninghame		1874	John Campbell, 7th Duke of Argyll	
Lady Elizabeth Leveson-Gower	1824	1878	George Campbell, 8th Duke of Argyll	
Amelia Claughton	1843	1894	George Campbell, 8th Duke of Argyll	
Ina McNeill	1843	1925	George Campbell, 8th Duke of Argyll	
Princess Louise	1848	1939	John Campbell, 9th Duke of Argyll	
Louise Vanneck	1904	1970	Ian Campbell, 11th Duke of Argyll	
Margaret Whigham	1912	1993	Ian Campbell, 11th Duke of Argyll	
Mathilda Mortimer	1925	1997	Ian Campbell, 11th Duke of Argyll	
Iona Colquhoun	1945	2024	Ian Campbell, 12th Duke of Argyll	
Eleanor Cadbury	1973		Torquhil Campbell, 13th Duke of Argyll	

=== Peerage of the United Kingdom (1892) ===
Name	Date of birth	Date of death	Spouse	Ref
Ina McNeill	1843	1925	George Campbell, 8th Duke of Argyll	
Princess Louise of the United Kingdom	1848	1939	John Campbell, 9th Duke of Argyll	
Louise Vanneck	1904	1970	Ian Campbell, 11th Duke of Argyll	
Margaret Whigham	1912	1993	Ian Campbell, 11th Duke of Argyll	
Mathilda Mortimer	1925	1997	Ian Campbell, 11th Duke of Argyll	
Iona Colquhoun	1945	2024	Ian Campbell, 12th Duke of Argyll	
Eleanor Cadbury	1973		Torquhil Campbell, 13th Duke of Argyll	
