= William B. Coster =

American banker (1867–1918)

- Born: William Bay Coster; 1867; New York City, U.S.
- Died: December 19, 1918 (aged 50–51); Bournemouth, England, U.K.
- Spouse: Maria Griswold Gray (m. 1900)
- Children: 3
- Parent(s): Charles Robert Coster; Marie Bay James Coster

William Bay Coster (1867 – December 19, 1918) was an American banker who was prominent in New York Society during the Gilded Age.

== Early life ==
Coster was born in New York and lived at a large home at 103 East 71st Street. He was one of four children born to Charles Robert Coster (1839–1888) and Marie Bay (née James) Coster (1841–1904), who were married in 1864. Among his siblings was brother Charles Coster, (Note: Charles Coster (d. 1908), was married to Helen Louise Anthon, daughter of Rev. Edward Anthon and Helen (née Post) Anthon.) and sister Elizabeth Mary Coster, who married Alfred Egmont Schermerhorn. (Note: Elizabeth Mary Coster (1877–1946) was married to Alfred Egmont Schermerhorn (1871–1932), a real estate dealer and member of the prominent Schermerhorn family. Their son, Alfred Coster Schermerhorn, was married to romantic fiction writer, Ursula Parrott.) His father was a soldier and public official, who is best known for commanding a brigade at the Battle of Gettysburg.

His maternal grandfather was Augustus J. James of Albany, the brother of theologian Henry James Sr., making William's mother Marie a first cousin of author Henry James, psychologist William James, and diarist Alice James. His paternal grandparents were John H. Coster and Sarah Adeline (née Boardman) Coster, making his father a first cousin of fellow New York clubman, Harry Coster. (Note: His grandfather, John H. Coster (better known as a playboy before a businessman), was one of twelve children that married into many prominent families.) His great-grandfather, John Gerard Coster, came from Haarlem in the Netherlands to the United States shortly after the Revolutionary War and founded the family fortune through the mercantile firm, "Henry A. & John G. Coster".

== Career ==
Coster became a stockbroker and opened up an office with his brother Charles and John M. Knapp in 1893. He later transferred his seat to Knapp in 1907, and resigned from the firm. He later became a partner in Morgan Drexel. He was known as a speed walker, who could be seen "traversing the sidewalks between the New York Athletic Club and the stock exchange in record time."

In 1908, his brother committed suicide "after he'd been caught bilking his customers out of millions of dollars." Although William was accused of wrongdoing, and, along with his other siblings, worked out of the same office as Charles, William himself was eventually declared by the New York Stock Exchange to be completely innocent in the debacle.

Coster also served in the New York National Guard as the aide de camp of the First Brigade, achieving the rank of captain in 1896.

=== Society life ===
In 1892, Coster, one of the best-known bachelor clubmen, was included in Ward McAllister's "Four Hundred", purported to be an index of New York's best families, published in The New York Times. Conveniently, 400 was the number of people that could fit into Mrs. Astor's ballroom. Coster was a member of the Union Club.

== Personal life ==
On October 1, 1900, Coster was married to Maria "Minnie" Griswold Gray (1868–1947) at St. Saviour's Episcopal Church in Bar Harbor, Maine. Minnie, a close friend of etiquette author Emily Post, was the daughter of Henry Winthrop Gray and Mary (née Travers) Gray, and the granddaughter of William R. Travers. (Note: Minnie's mother, Mary Mackall Travers (a granddaughter of U.S. Senator and U.S. Ambassador to the U.K. Reverdy Johnson), remarried to John G. Hecksher.) Her parents divorced and her father remarried to Matilda Frelinghuyhsen (daughter of U.S. Secretary of State F. T. Frelinghuysen) in May 1889. Together, William and Maria first lived in New York, then Paris, and became the parents of three children:

- Matilda Gray Coster (1901–1962), who married Stanley Yates Mortimer Jr. (1897–1984), a grandson of Valentine Hall Jr., nephew of Richard Mortimer, and first cousin of Eleanor Roosevelt, in 1925. They divorced in 1928, and she remarried to Luis Martínez de las Rivas, in 1932. They later lived in Cuernavaca, Mexico.
- Mary Griswold Coster (1903–1918), who died of pneumonia at age 15.
- William Bay Coster Jr. (1908–1945), who rowed on the Pembroke College crew at Oxford and was an air-raid warden in London during World War II.

After living in New York and Paris for many years, Coster died "of a long illness, patiently borne," in Bournemouth, England on December 19, 1918. His widow, who lived in Paris at 5 Rue Vaneau, died at her home, 39 East 79th Street in New York, at the age of 79 in July 1947.

=== Descendants ===
Through his daughter Matilda, he was the grandfather of Mathilda Coster Mortimer (1925–1997), Duchess of Argyll. Mathilda was first married to Clemens Heller, founder of the Salzburg Global Seminar, a school in Salzburg, Austria. They divorced in 1962 and in 1963, she remarried to Ian Campbell, 11th Duke of Argyll (1903–1973), following his rather public divorce from Margaret Campbell, Duchess of Argyll. Mathilda and the Duke of Argyll were the parents of one child, Lady Elspeth Campbell, who lived only five days after her birth in 1967. The Duke and Duchess remained married until the Duke's death on April 7, 1973.
