= Colquhoun baronets of Luss (1786) =

Escutcheon of the Colquhoun baronets of Luss

The Colquhoun baronetcy, of Luss in the County of Dumbarton, was created in the Baronetage of Great Britain on 27 June 1786 for James Colquhoun, the fourth son of the 6th Baronet of the 1625 creation.

The 3rd and 4th Baronets both represented Dunbartonshire in the House of Commons. The 4th, 5th and 7th Baronets all served as Lord-Lieutenant of Dumbartonshire.

The present Baronet is also Chief of Clan Colquhoun. One of the family seats, as of 1949, was Rossdhu House near Luss; in 2000 Camstraddan, Luss.

== Colquhoun baronets, of Luss (1786) ==
- Sir James Colquhoun, 1st Baronet (1714–1786)
- Sir James Colquhoun, 2nd Baronet (1741–1805)
- Sir James Colquhoun, 3rd Baronet (1774–1836), MP for Dunbartonshire 1799–1806, married Janet Colquhoun.
- Sir James Colquhoun, 4th Baronet (1804–1873), MP for Dunbartonshire 1837–41, drowned in Loch Lomond.
- Sir James Colquhoun, 5th Baronet (1844–1907)
- Sir Alan John Colquhoun, 6th Baronet (1838–1910)
- Sir Iain Colquhoun, 7th Baronet (1887–1948)
- Sir Ivar Iain Colquhoun, 8th Baronet (1916–2008)
- Sir Malcolm Rory Colquhoun, 9th Baronet (b.1947)

The heir apparent is the present holder's eldest son Patrick John Colquhoun (b. 1980).

== Notes ==
Baronetage of Great Britain
Preceded by Macpherson baronets	Colquhoun baronets of Luss; 27 June 1786	Succeeded by Douglas baronets
