= Ian Campbell, 11th Duke of Argyll =

Scottish peer (1903–1973)

His Grace The Duke of Argyll
- The Duke in 1953
- Predecessor: Niall Campbell, 10th Duke of Argyll
- Successor: Ian Campbell, 12th Duke of Argyll
- Known for: 1963 divorce
- Born: Ian Douglas Campbell; 18 June 1903; Paris, France
- Died: 7 April 1973 (aged 69); Edinburgh, Scotland
- Spouses: The Hon. Janet Gladys Aitken (m. 1927; div. 1934) Louise Hollingsworth Morris Vanneck (m. 1935; div. 1951) Margaret Whigham (m. 1951; div. 1963) Mathilda Coster Mortimer (m. 1963)
- Issue: Lady Jeanne Campbell; Ian Campbell, 12th Duke of Argyll; Lord Colin Ivar Campbell; Lady Elspeth Campbell
- Parents: Douglas Campbell; Aimee Lawrence

Member of the House of Lords Lord Temporal
- In office 31 July 1963 – 7 April 1973; Hereditary Peerage
- Succeeded by: Ian Campbell, 12th Duke of Argyll
- Military career
- Allegiance: United Kingdom
- Branch: British Army
- Service years: 1939–1945
- Rank: Captain
- Service number: 547098
- Unit: Argyll and Sutherland Highlanders
- Conflicts: World War II; Battle of France

Ian Douglas Campbell, 11th and 4th Duke of Argyll (18 June 1903 – 7 April 1973), was a Scottish peer and the Chief of Clan Campbell (Scottish Gaelic: MacCailein Mòr). He is chiefly remembered for his unhappy marriage to, and scandalous 1963 divorce from, his third wife, Margaret Whigham.

== Early life ==
Ian Douglas Campbell was born in Paris, France. He was the son of Douglas Walter Campbell and his wife, Aimée Marie Suzanne Lawrence. His paternal grandfather, Lord Walter Campbell, was the third son of the 8th Duke of Argyll. Through his father, he was the great nephew of Queen Victoria's daughter Louise, who married John Campbell, 9th Duke of Argyll, the fourth Governor General of Canada. He was educated at Milton Academy in Milton, Massachusetts, United States and Christ Church, Oxford.

He served during the Second World War with the rank of captain in the 8th Battalion Argyll and Sutherland Highlanders and saw combat during the Fall of France. Along with his GOC Maj. Gen. Victor Fortune, the war poet Aonghas Caimbeul and all surviving members of the 51st (Highland) Division, Captain Campbell surrendered to Wehrmacht General Erwin Rommel at Saint-Valery-en-Caux in Normandy on 12 June 1940. He was held as a prisoner of war until 1945.

He inherited the titles Duke of Argyll and Chief of Clan Campbell (Scottish Gaelic: MacCailein Mòr) following the death of his first cousin once removed, the 10th Duke, on 20 August 1949.

== Personal life ==
Argyll was married four times. He was known to be addicted to alcohol, gambling and prescription drugs amphetamine and barbiturates. The Duke was also accused of physical and emotional abuse by his wives, whose money he tried to use for maintaining Inveraray Castle. His five years of mental and physical abuse in Nazi captivity during World War II likely resulted in what is now known as PTSD (Post-Traumatic Stress Disorder), thereby adversely affecting his personality, marriages, family and personal relationships for the remainder of his life.

His first marriage was to Janet Gladys Aitken, daughter of business tycoon and press baron Max Aitken, 1st Baron Beaverbrook, on 12 December 1927. They had a daughter:

- Lady Jeanne Campbell (1928–2007).

Ian and Janet divorced in 1934. Argyll's second marriage was to Louise Hollingsworth Morris Vanneck, née Clews, daughter of Henry Clews Jr. by his wife Louise Hollingsworth Morris (ex-wife 1894–1901 of Frederick Gebhard) of Baltimore, Maryland and former wife of Hon. Andrew Vanneck on 23 November 1935. This marriage produced two sons:

- Ian Campbell, 12th Duke of Argyll (1937–2001), who married Iona Colquhoun on 4 July 1964. They had two children.
- Colin Ivar Campbell (b. 1946), who married Georgia Arianna Ziadie on 23 March 1974; they were divorced in 1975.

This marriage also ended in divorce, in 1951.

Argyll's third marriage was to Margaret Whigham, mother of Frances, Dowager Duchess of Rutland, from her previous marriage to Charles Francis Sweeny. They were married on 22 March 1951. Margaret was a glittering society figure. While married to the duke, she had affairs with other men including actor Douglas Fairbanks Jr. and allegedly Duncan Sandys, the minister of defence. The marriage was childless and they divorced in 1963 after the duke found Polaroid photographs of her sexual activities with other men. In the divorce proceedings, the duke produced the photographs, which featured the duchess wearing only her signature triple-string of pearls while fellating an unidentified man. In hearings which gained much media attention, the divorce was granted, though on grounds of adultery with a different man.

Argyll's fourth and final marriage was to Mathilda Coster Mortimer on 15 June 1963. Mathilda, who was first married to Clemens Heller, founder of the Salzburg Global Seminar, a school in Salzburg, Austria, was the granddaughter of New York banker and clubman William B. Coster. From this marriage he had a daughter:

- Lady Elspeth Campbell (1967–1967), who lived only five days.

They remained married until the duke's death on 7 April 1973. They lived in a Paris apartment for years, visiting Scotland only briefly. He had spent much of his youth in France and he was bilingual.

He died in a private hospital nursing home in Edinburgh, from the effects of a stroke. He was succeeded by his son Ian.

While most dukes and duchesses of Argyll are buried at Kilmun Parish Church, Ian Campbell and his son, the 12th duke, both chose to be buried on the island of Inishail in Loch Awe.

== Ancestry ==
Ancestors of Ian Campbell, 11th Duke of Argyll

16. John Campbell, 7th Duke of Argyll
8. George Campbell, 8th Duke of Argyll
17. Joan Glassel
4. Lord Walter Campbell 1848-1889
18. George Sutherland-Leveson-Gower, 2nd Duke of Sutherland
9. Lady Elizabeth Leveson-Gower 1824-1878
19. Lady Harriet Howard
2. Douglas Walter Campbell 1877-1926
?
10. John Clarkson Milns 1813-1875
?
5. Olivia Rowlandson Milns 1855-1892
?
11. Grace Gourlay Mactaggart 1822-1895
?
1. Ian Douglas Campbell, 11th Duke of Argyll 1903-1973
24. Richard Penfold Lawrence 1779-1829
12. John Riker Lawrence 1806-1872
25. Sarah Ann Conrey d. 1861
6. John Lawrence 1837-1896
26. Abraham Quick 1774-1835
13. Margaretta Quick 1810-1887
27. Sarah Betts 1776-1855
3. Aimée Marie Suzanne Theresa LaFarge Lawrence 1873-1920
28. Pierre de La Farge 1745-????
14. Jean Frédéric LaFarge 1790-1858
29. Marie Jeanne Frujien 1743-????
7. Emily Marie LaFarge 1847-1932
30. Louis Binsse de St. Victor
15. Louisa Josephine Binsse de St. Victor 1805-1895
31. Victoire Bancel de Confoulens

== In popular culture ==
- Ian and Margaret's marriage and scandalous divorce was dramatised in the Amazon/BBC's A Very British Scandal, written by Sarah Phelps and broadcast in 2021, starring Paul Bettany as the Duke, Claire Foy as Margaret Campbell, Duchess of Argyll, and Sophia Myles as the Duke's previous wife, Louise Timpson.

== The San Juan de Sicilia galleon ==
The galleon San Juan de Sicilia was destroyed in 1588 and has remained at Tobermory Bay's sea ever since. The 11th Duke of Argyll tried to bring the supposed treasures back from the ship in March 1954, just as his predecessors had, but without success.

Peerage of Scotland
Preceded by Niall Campbell	Duke of Argyll; 1949–1973	Succeeded by Ian Campbell
Peerage of the United Kingdom
Preceded by Niall Campbell	Duke of Argyll; 1949–1973	Succeeded by Ian Campbell
