= Margaret Campbell, Duchess of Argyll =

British socialite (1912–1993)

Coordinates: 51.29783°N 0.63162°W

Margaret Campbell
- Duchess of Argyll
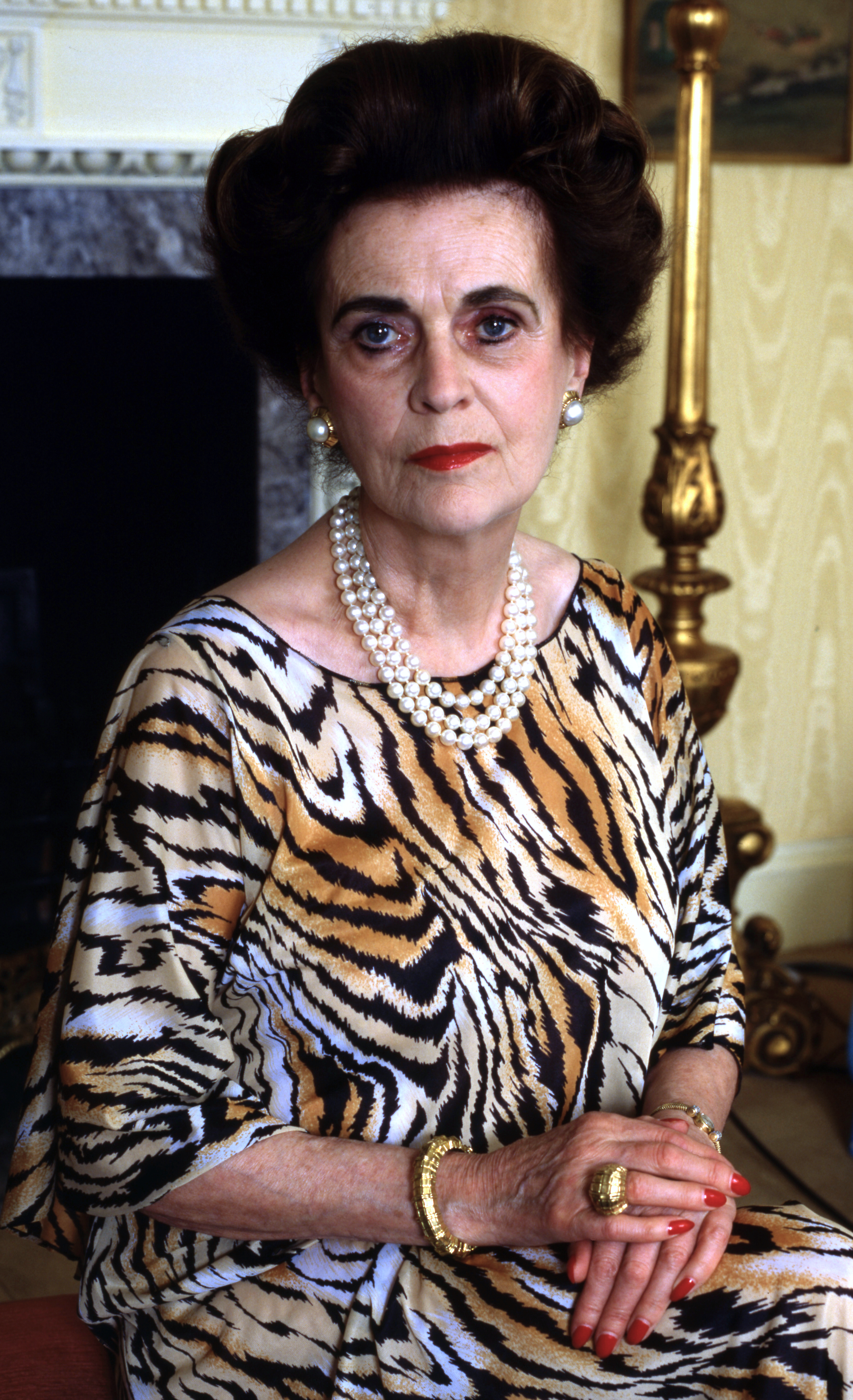
- Portrait by Allan Warren, 1991
- Born: Ethel Margaret Whigham; 1 December 1912; Newton Mearns, Renfrewshire, Scotland
- Died: 25 July 1993 (aged 80); Pimlico, London, England
- Buried: Brookwood Cemetery, Surrey, England
- Spouses: Charles Francis Sweeny (m. 1933; div. 1947); The 11th Duke of Argyll (m. 1951; div. 1963)
- Issue: 3, including Frances, Duchess of Rutland
- Parents: George Hay Whigham; Helen Mann Hannay

Ethel Margaret Campbell, Duchess of Argyll (née Whigham, formerly Sweeny; 1 December 1912 – 25 July 1993) was a Scottish heiress, socialite and aristocrat who was most famous for her 1951 marriage and much-publicised 1963 divorce from her second husband, Ian Campbell, 11th Duke of Argyll.

== Early years ==
Ethel Margaret Whigham was the only child of Helen Mann Hannay and George Hay Whigham. Her father, the son of Scottish lawyer and cricketer David Dundas Whigham, was chairman of the Celanese Corporation of Britain and North America. He was a self-made millionaire: although his father and mother were well-connected, they were not particularly wealthy when they got married. Margaret spent the first fourteen years of her life in New York City, where she was educated privately at the Hewitt School. Her beauty was much spoken of and she had youthful romances with Prince Aly Khan, millionaire aviator Glen Kidston and publishing heir Max Aitken, later the second Lord Beaverbrook.

In 1928, the future actor David Niven, then 18, had sex with 15-year-old Margaret during a holiday at Bembridge on the Isle of Wight. To the fury of her father, she became pregnant as a result. She was taken into a London nursing home for a secret abortion. "All hell broke loose," remembered her family cook, Elizabeth Duckworth. Margaret did not mention the episode in her 1975 memoirs, but she continued to adore Niven until the day he died. She was among the VIP guests at his London memorial service.

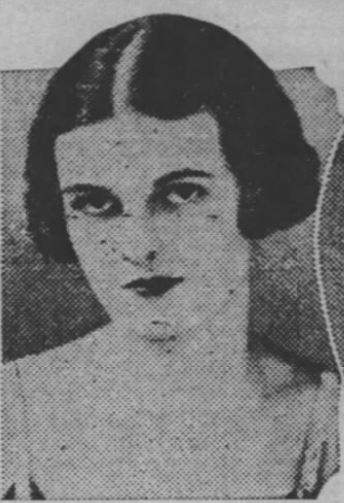
Margaret in 1933

In 1930, Margaret was presented at Court in London and was known as the debutante of that year. Shortly afterwards, she announced her engagement to Charles Guy Fulke Greville, 7th Earl of Warwick. However, the wedding did not take place because she preferred Charles Francis Sweeny (1910–1993), an American businessman and amateur golfer from a wealthy Pennsylvania family. Her numerous early romances included an affair with Prince George, Duke of Kent.

== First marriage ==
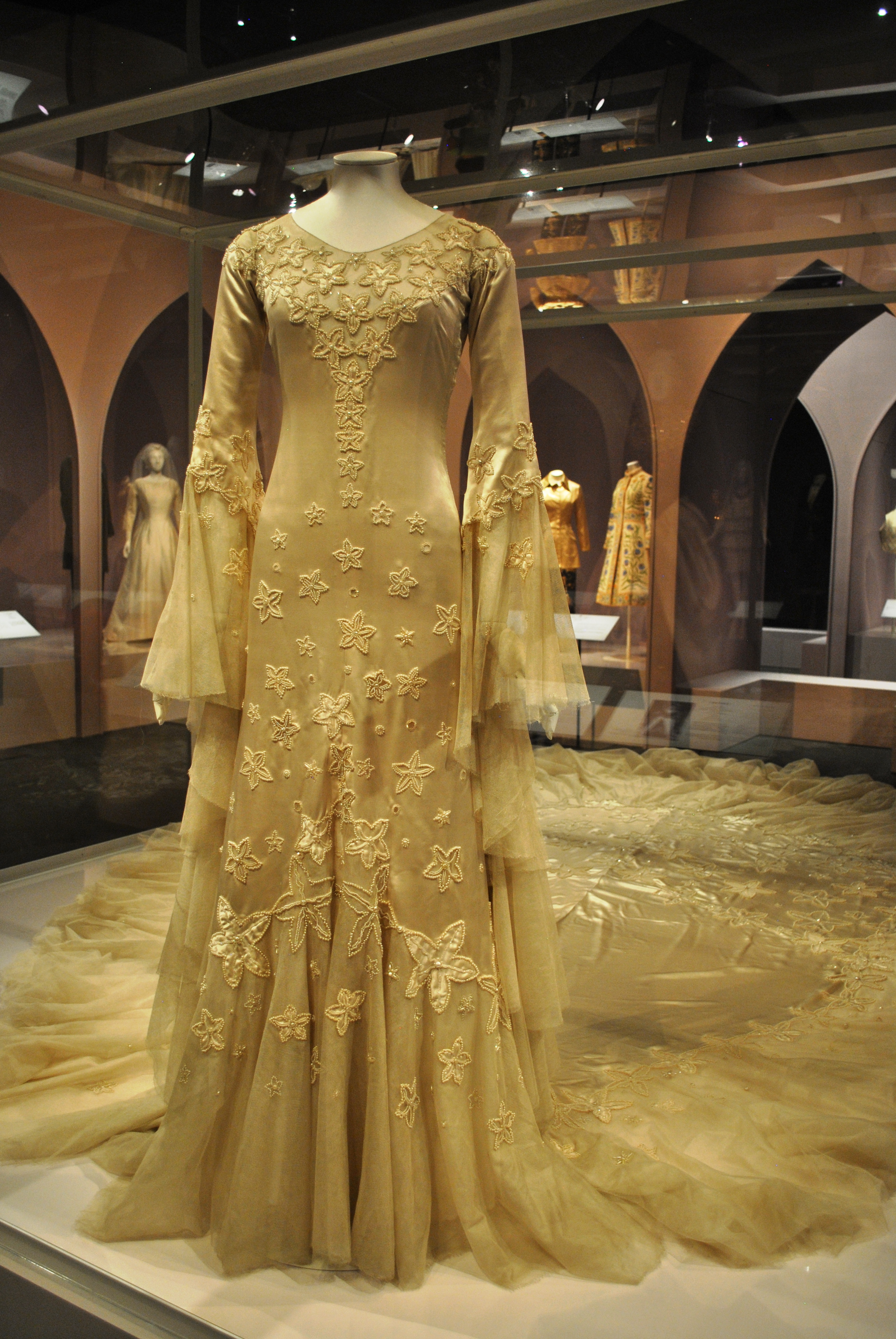
Margaret's wedding dress for her marriage to Charles Sweeny in 1933, designed by Norman Hartnell. It was made of silk satin and tulle embroidered with glass beads, with a 2.6-metre (8 ft 6 in) train. Victoria and Albert Museum, London

On 21 February 1933, following her conversion to Catholicism, Margaret married Sweeny at the Brompton Oratory, London. Such had been the publicity surrounding her Norman Hartnell wedding dress that the traffic in Knightsbridge was blocked for three hours. For the rest of her life, Margaret was associated with glamour and elegance, being a regular client of Hartnell, Victor Stiebel, and Angele Delanghe in London before and after the Second World War. She was one of a series of society beauties photographed as classical figures by Madame Yevonde.

She had three children with Sweeny: a daughter, who was stillborn at eight months in late 1933; another daughter, Frances Helen (1937–2024; who married Charles Manners, 10th Duke of Rutland), and a son, Brian Charles (1940–2021). Before these pregnancies, she suffered eight miscarriages.

In 1943, Margaret had a near-fatal fall down a lift shaft. "I fell forty feet (12 m) to the bottom of the lift shaft", she later recalled. "The only thing that saved me was the lift cable, which broke my fall. I must have clutched at it, for it was later found that all my fingernails were torn off. I apparently fell onto my knees and cracked the back of my head against the wall".

== Intermarital relationships ==
The Sweenys divorced in 1947. After her first marriage ended, Margaret was briefly engaged to a Texas-born banker, Joseph Thomas of Lehman Brothers, but he fell in love with another woman and the engagement was broken. She also had a serious romantic relationship with Theodore Rousseau, curator of the Metropolitan Museum of Art, who was, she recalled, "highly intelligent, witty and self-confident to the point of arrogance". That romance also ended without the couple formalising their liaison, since the mother of two "feared that Ted was not 'stepfather material'". Still, she observed in her memoirs, "[W]e continued to see each other constantly."

== Second marriage ==
On 22 March 1951, Margaret became the third wife of Ian Douglas Campbell, 11th Duke of Argyll. She wrote later in life:

I had wealth, I had good looks. As a young woman I had been constantly photographed, written about, flattered, admired, included in the Ten Best-Dressed Women in the World list, and mentioned by Cole Porter in the words of his hit song "You're the Top". The top was what I was supposed to be. I had become a duchess and mistress of a historic castle. My daughter had married a duke. Life was apparently roses all the way.

In truth, Margaret was not mentioned in Porter's original version of "You're the Top"; however, in the British version of the song adapted by P. G. Wodehouse, two lines were changed, and "You're an O'Neill drama / You're Whistler's mama", became "You're Mussolini / You're Mrs Sweeny".

According to Lyndsy Spence, one of the Duchess' biographers, the Duke of Argyll forged a deed of sale (sometimes called a deed of gift, thus offering various items from Inveraray Castle as security) before their marriage in exchange for her money, which was used to restore his family home at Inveraray. He also wiretapped her car. The Duchess herself forged letters to sow doubt about the fatherhood of Ian Campbell, the Marquess of Lorne, and Lord Colin Campbell, her husband's sons from his second marriage to Louise Timpson; and she even tried to acquire a newborn baby she could pass off as her husband's rightful heir.

== Second divorce ==
Within a few years, the marriage was falling apart. The Duke was known to be addicted to alcohol, gambling and prescription drugs, and was described as physically violent and emotionally abusive by his first two wives, whose money he tried to use to maintain Inveraray Castle. He suspected the Duchess of infidelity and, while she was in New York, engaged a locksmith to break open a cupboard at their Mayfair home, 48 Upper Grosvenor Street. The evidence discovered resulted in the 1963 divorce case, in which the Duke accused his wife of infidelity and included a set of Polaroid photographs of the Duchess naked, save for her signature three-strand pearl necklace, in the company of another man. There were also photographs of the Duchess fellating a naked man whose face was not shown. It was speculated that this "headless man" was the Minister of Defence Duncan Sandys (later Lord Duncan-Sandys, former son-in-law of Winston Churchill), who offered to resign from the cabinet.

The Duchess counter-petitioned the divorce, accusing the Duke of committing adultery with her stepmother, Jane Corby Whigham. She dropped her case the day of the hearing due to lack of a witness, and later had to pay a judgment of £25,000 to her stepmother, who sued her for libel, slander, and conspiracy to suborn perjury.

A list of as many as 88 men with whom the Duke believed his wife had consorted was produced. The list is said to include two government ministers and three members of the British royal family. The judge commented that the Duchess had indulged in "disgusting sexual activities". Lord Denning, who was called upon by the government to track down the "headless man", compared the handwriting of the five leading "suspects", (Duncan Sandys; Douglas Fairbanks, Jr.; John Cohane, an American businessman; Peter Combe, a former press officer at the Savoy Hotel; and Sigismund von Braun, brother of the German scientist Wernher von Braun) with the captions written on the photographs. It is claimed that this analysis proved that the man in question was Fairbanks, then long married to his second wife, but this was not made public.

Granting the divorce, Lord Wheatley, the presiding judge, said the evidence established that the Duchess "was a completely promiscuous woman whose sexual appetite could only be satisfied with a number of men". He continued: "Her attitude to the sanctity of marriage was what moderns would call 'enlightened' but which in plain language was wholly immoral." Many of the men the Duchess was alleged to have slept with were homosexual; she was unwilling to divulge this as sexual acts between men were illegal in the United Kingdom at the time.

The Duchess never revealed the identity of the "headless man", and Fairbanks always denied the allegation. Long afterwards, it was claimed that there were actually two "headless men" in the photographs, Fairbanks and Sandys, the latter identified on the basis of the Duchess's statement that "the only Polaroid camera in the country at that time had been lent to the Ministry of Defence". In 2013, the daughter-in-law of the 11th Duke, Lady Colin Campbell, stated that the "headless man" was an American executive named Bill Lyons.

== Final years ==
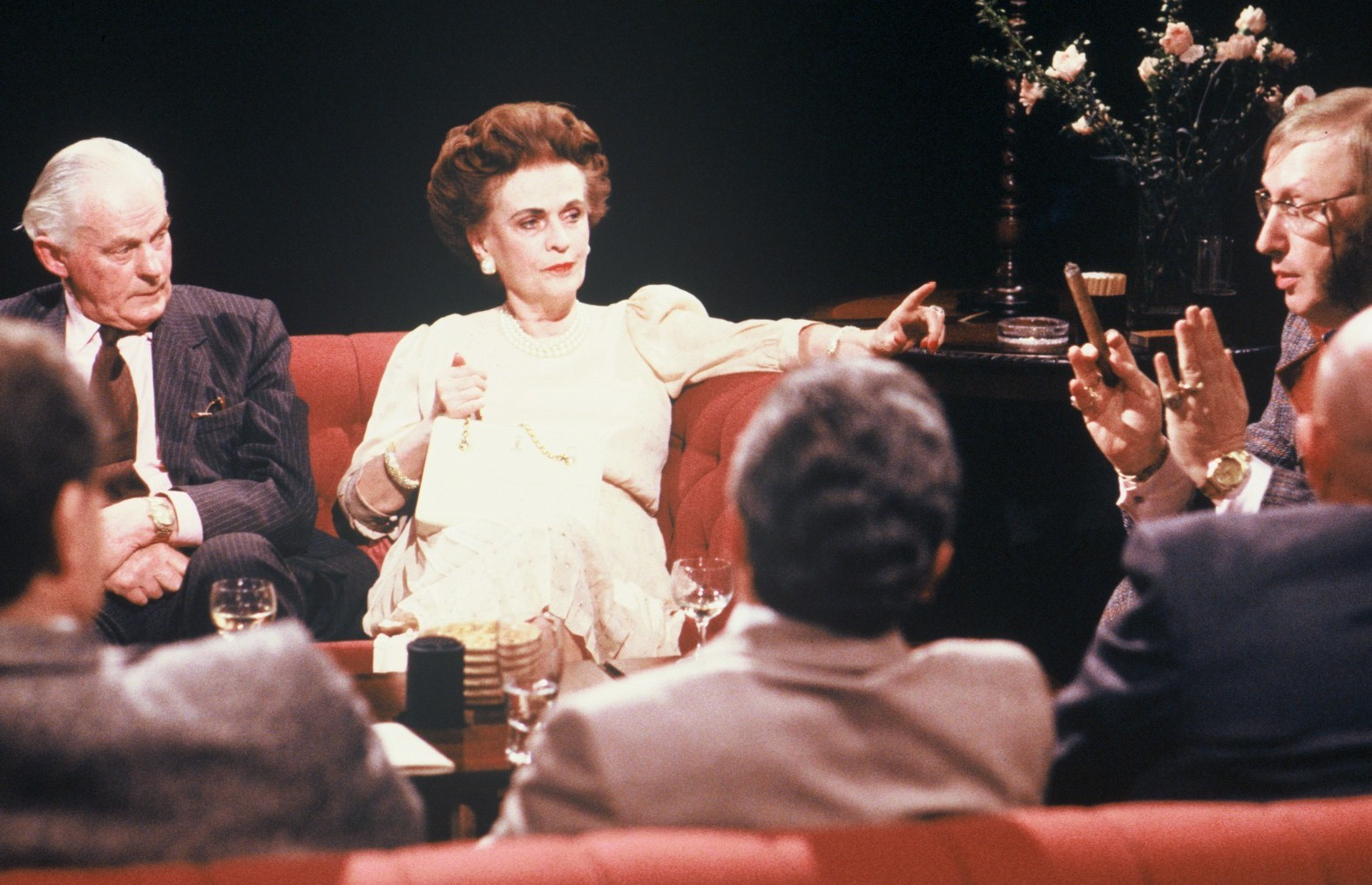
Margaret, Duchess of Argyll, appearing on After Dark in 1988

The Duchess wrote a memoir, Forget Not (published by W. H. Allen Ltd in 1975), which was reviewed negatively for its name-dropping and air of entitlement. She also lent her name as author to a guide to entertaining. With her fortune diminished, she opened her London house at 48 Upper Grosvenor Street, which had been decorated for her parents in 1935 by Syrie Maugham, for paid tours. Her extravagant lifestyle and ill-considered investments left her largely penniless by the time she died.

In 1978, Margaret's debts forced her to move from Upper Grosvenor Street and relocate with her maid to a suite at the Grosvenor House Hotel. In April 1988, on the evening after the Grand National, she appeared on a Channel 4 After Dark discussion about horse racing, so she said, "to put the point of view of the horse", later walking out of the programme "because she was so very sleepy". In 1990, unable to pay the hotel bills, she was evicted and, with the support of friends and her first husband, moved into an apartment.

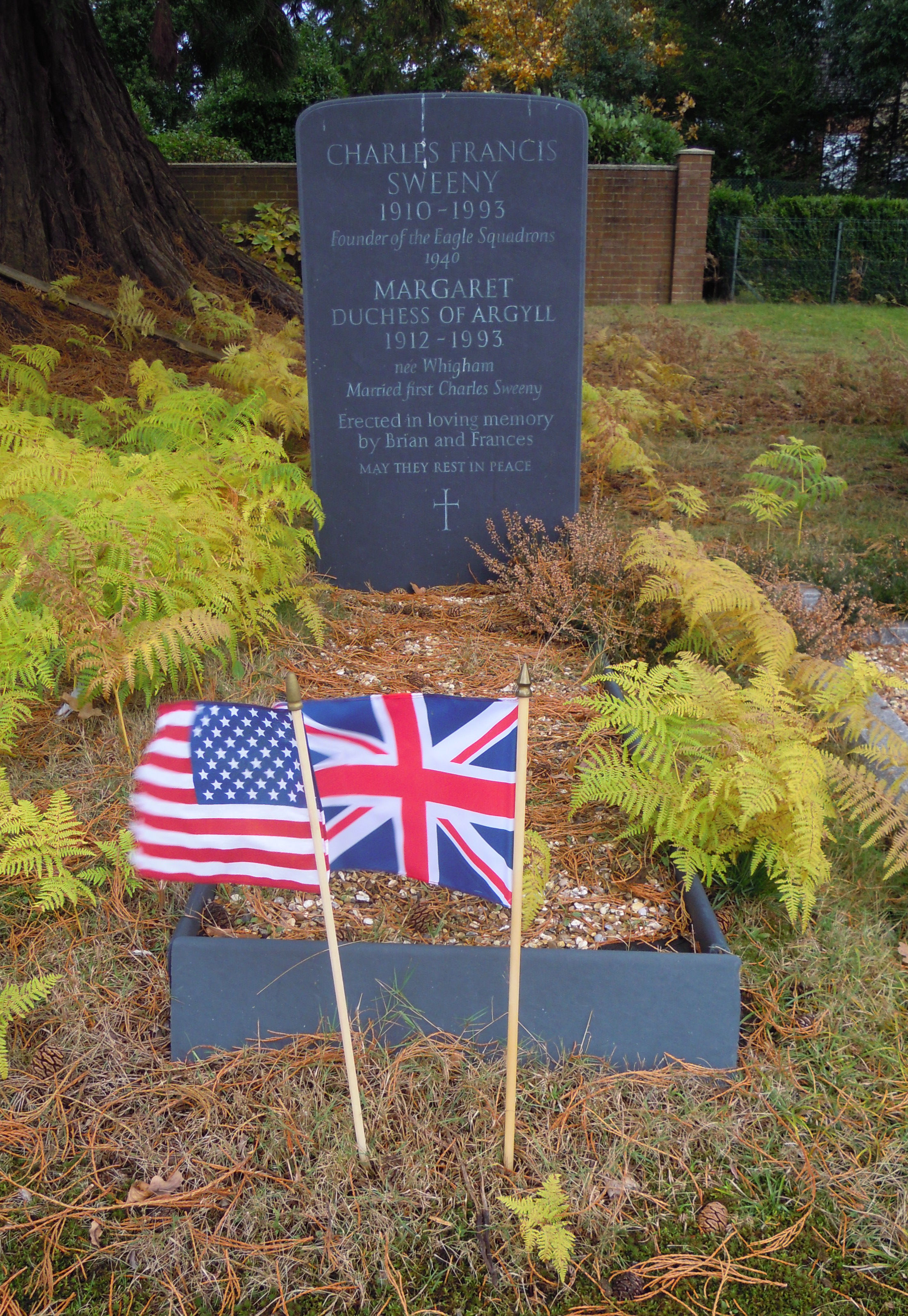
Grave of Margaret, Duchess of Argyll, and her first husband, in Brookwood Cemetery, Surrey

Margaret's children later placed her in a nursing home in Pimlico, London. The Duchess died in penury in 1993 after a bad fall in the nursing home. Her funeral, a Requiem Mass, was held at the Church of the Immaculate Conception, Farm Street in Mayfair. She was buried alongside her first husband, Charles Sweeny, who had died only four months earlier, in Brookwood Cemetery in Woking, Surrey.

Margaret had asked Charles Castle in 1974 to write her biography. He then published The Duchess Who Dared – The Life of Margaret, Duchess of Argyll in 1994. It was reprinted in 1995 by Pan Books, and in 2021, to coincide with the TV series A Very British Scandal, by Swift Press.

== Personality ==
The Duchess once told The New York Times: "I don't think anybody has real style or class any more. Everyone's got old and fat." She described herself as "always vain". Another quote gives an insight into her personality: "Always a poodle, only a poodle! That, and three strands of pearls!" she said. "Together they are absolutely the essential things in life."

== In popular culture ==
- Powder Her Face, a chamber opera based on major events in the Duchess's life, received its premiere at the Cheltenham Music Festival in 1995. The English composer Thomas Adès wrote the music, and novelist Philip Hensher contributed the libretto; the Festival, alongside the Almeida Opera, commissioned the piece. The opera's Duchess character, an image of the real woman refracted through an astringent camp sensibility, invites both sympathy and contempt for her by design.
- Her divorce from the Duke of Argyll was dramatised in the BBC/Amazon Studios miniseries A Very British Scandal, written by Sarah Phelps and broadcast in 2021, starring Claire Foy as the Duchess.
