= Louise Timpson =

American socialite and British aristocrat (1904–1970)

- Born: Louise Hollingsworth Morris Clews; November 27, 1904; Paris, France
- Died: February 10, 1970 (aged 65); New York, New York, U.S.
- Title: The Duchess of Argyll (1949–1951)
- Spouses: Andrew Vanneck (m. 1930; div. 1933) Ian Douglas Campbell, 11th Duke of Argyll (m. 1935; div. 1951) Robert Timpson (m. 1954; div. 1963)
- Children: Ian Campbell, 12th Duke of Argyll; Lord Colin Ivar Campbell
- Parent(s): Henry Clews Jr. Louise Hollingsworth Morris

Louise Timpson (née Louise Hollingsworth Morris Clews, formerly Vanneck; November 27, 1904 – February 10, 1970), previously Louise Campbell, Duchess of Argyll, was an American socialite and, later, a British aristocrat. She was the second wife of Ian Douglas Campbell, 11th Duke of Argyll and the mother of the 12th Duke.

== Early life ==
She was the daughter of the American-born artist Henry Clews Jr., and his first wife, the New York socialite Louise Hollingsworth (née Morris) Gebhard. Before her parents' 1901 marriage, her mother had been married to Frederick Gebhard. Throughout her life, she was known as Oui-Oui, which is how she pronounced "Wee Louise", as she was called to distinguish her from her mother.

Her paternal grandparents were Henry Clews, an English-born Wall Street investment banker, and Lucy Madison (née Worthington) Clews, who was related to U.S. President James Madison. Her maternal grandparents were John Boucher Morris and Louise Kittera (née Van Dyke) Morris.

== Personal life ==
=== First marriage ===
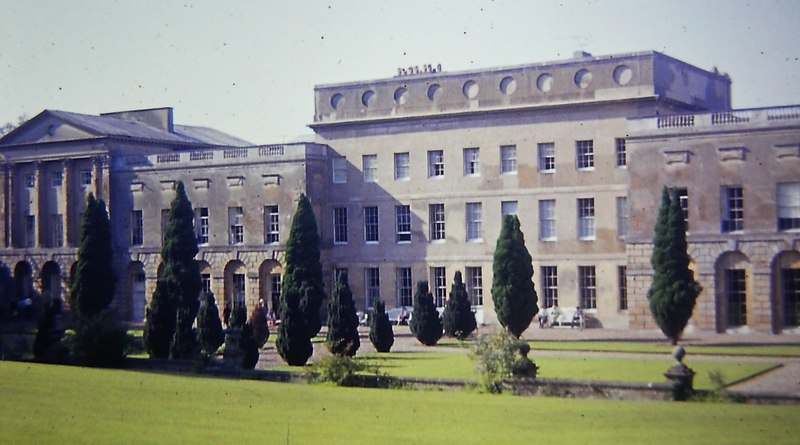
Heveningham Hall in 1967

On September 1, 1930, Louise was married to the Hon. Andrew Nicholas Armstrong Vanneck (1890–1965), son of the Hon. William Arcedeckne Vanneck, and his wife, the former Mary Armstrong. Andrew was the younger brother of William Vanneck, 5th Baron Huntingfield, who was the 17th Governor of Victoria. Their married home was at Heveningham Hall. They had no children, and were divorced in 1933.

=== Second marriage ===
Two years after her divorce from Vanneck, she married Captain Ian Campbell (1903–1973) on November 23, 1935. Campbell's first marriage, to Janet Gladys Aitken (daughter of Max Aitken, 1st Baron Beaverbrook), had ended in divorce in 1934. There was one daughter from Campbell's marriage to Aitken, Lady Jeanne Campbell (1928–2007), who was brought up mainly by her father when her mother returned to Canada without her. Lady Jeanne later married the American writer Norman Mailer in 1962; they divorced shortly thereafter in 1963. Together, Louise and Ian were the parents of two sons:

- Ian Campbell, 12th Duke of Argyll (1937–2001), who married Iona Colquhoun, daughter of Sir Ivar Colquhoun, 8th Baronet, and had two children.
- Lord Colin Ivar Campbell (born 1946), who married Georgia Arianna Ziadie, a Jamaican-born British writer.

During the Second World War, Campbell was in the armed forces and spent five years from 1940 to 1945 as a prisoner of war. His wife crossed the Pyrenees to Lisbon, where she helped with relief efforts. Among other things, she arranged for beer and Christmas puddings to be received at the POW camps. The mental and physical abuse in Nazis captivity likely resulted in what is now known as PTSD (Post-Traumatic Stress Disorder) thereby adversely affecting Campbell's personality, marriages, family, and personal relationships for the remainder of his life.

Campbell inherited his cousin's dukedom in 1949, making his wife Duchess of Argyll, but they were divorced in 1951. The duke was a notorious spendthrift, and, when asked, Louise is said to have replied "He took everything but my trust funds." The duchess filed for divorce because of the duke's adultery with the woman who would become his third wife, the notorious Margaret Whigham Sweeny.

=== Third marriage ===
She relocated to the United States following her divorce, and her third marriage was to Robert Clermont Livingston Timpson (1908–1988), an American investment banker, in 1954. Timpson was the grandson of John Henry Livingston of the prominent Livingston family. They moved into Grasmere, a mansion in Rhinebeck, which she later opened to the public.

They divorced in 1963, and the former duchess died in New York in 1970, aged 65.

== In popular culture ==
In the 2021 mini-series A Very British Scandal, Timpson was played by Sophia Myles.
