= Mathilda Campbell, Duchess of Argyll =

Scottish noblewoman (1925–1997)

Her Grace Mathilda Campbell, Duchess of Argyll
- Campbell in the mid-1960s
- Born: Mathilda Coster Mortimer; 20 August 1925; Geneva, Switzerland
- Died: 5 June 1997 (aged 71); Paris, France
- Education: Harvard University
- Title: Duchess of Argyll
- Spouses: Clemens Heller (m. 1948; div. 1961) Ian Campbell, 11th Duke of Argyll (m. 1963)
- Children: 4

Mathilda Campbell, Duchess of Argyll (born Mathilda Coster Mortimer; 20 August 1925 – 5 June 1997) was a Scottish noblewoman. She was the fourth and final wife of Ian Campbell, 11th Duke of Argyll.

== Biography ==
Campbell was born on 20 August 1925 in Geneva, Switzerland to American parents Stanley Mortimer and his wife Mathilda (née Coster). Her father was a landowner from Litchfield, Connecticut, and her mother was the daughter of the banker William B. Coster. She was raised by her grandparents in France, then eventually went on to study philosophy at Harvard University.

In 1948, Campbell married Clemens Heller, a professor of human sciences at the University of Paris. They had three sons together before divorcing in 1961.

Campbell met the then-recently divorced Duke of Argyll, Ian Campbell in Scotland not long after her divorce from Heller; he was 22 years her senior. Ian Campbell (unknown to Mathilda at the time) had an affair with her mother in the 1920s. They began a relationship shortly after meeting and were married in 1963 at the Registry Office in Horsham, West Sussex. The Duke and Duchess had one child together, Lady Elspeth Campbell, born in 1967. However, Elspeth died within a few days of her birth. In 1969, they moved to France, spending time in both Paris and Vézelay. The Duke died in 1973 in Edinburgh.

Campbell was fluent in both French and German. In her later years, she wrote a novel called Orian — A Philosophical Journey, inspired by the death of her youngest son. She also had a keen interest in photography, and once held an exhibition of her work at the Demarco Gallery in Edinburgh.

Campbell died on 5 June 1997, aged 71, at the American Hospital of Paris. She was buried shortly after in Vézelay, near her home.
