= A Very British Scandal =

2021 British TV series

- Genre: Historical drama
- Written by: Sarah Phelps
- Directed by: Anne Sewitsky
- Starring: Claire Foy; Paul Bettany
- Composer: Nathan Barr
- Country of origin: United Kingdom
- Original language: English
- No. of episodes: 3

Production
- Executive producers: Sarah Phelps; Anne Sewitsky; Claire Foy; Kate Triggs; Delyth Scudamore; Graham Broadbent; Peter Czernin; Diarmuid McKeown; Lucy Richer; Dominic Treadwell-Collins
- Producer: Chris Ballantyne
- Production locations: England; Scotland
- Cinematography: Si Bell
- Editor: Dominic Strevens
- Running time: 177 minutes
- Production companies: Blueprint Television; Sony Pictures Television Studios; Amazon Studios

Original release
- Network: BBC One
- Release: 26 December – 28 December 2021

Related
- A Very English Scandal; A Very Royal Scandal

A Very British Scandal is a 2021 British-American three-part historical drama series starring Claire Foy as Margaret Campbell, Duchess of Argyll and Paul Bettany as Ian Campbell, 11th Duke of Argyll. While not a direct sequel or continuation, its production company, Blueprint Pictures, previously made A Very English Scandal (2018), about the Thorpe affair. A third installment, A Very Royal Scandal (2024), based on the infamous Prince Andrew interview with Emily Maitlis, premiered in September 2024.

Written and created by Sarah Phelps, A Very British Scandal premiered in the United Kingdom on BBC One on 26 December 2021, and on Amazon Prime Video on 22 April 2022.

== Synopsis ==
The three-episode series dramatises the marriage of Margaret Whigham Sweeny and Ian Campbell, 11th Duke of Argyll and Chief (Scottish Gaelic: MacCailein Mòr) of Clan Campbell, and the media frenzy surrounding their 1963 Argyll v Argyll divorce case.

Ian Campbell, 11th Duke of Argyll, is a member of the Scottish nobility and the House of Lords in the early 1960s. He meets socialite Margaret Whigham Sweeny and falls in love with her while he is still married to his second wife, Louise.

After marrying Margaret, Ian Campbell announces that he intends to leave his estate to his oldest son. Margaret―who stands to gain nothing in the event of her new husband's death―starts rumours that Ian's children are illegitimate.

It became a notorious and scandalous legal case, featuring accusations of adultery, forgery, theft, domestic violence, drug use and bribery. The series explores the social and political climate of post-war Britain and attitudes toward women in the 1960s.

== Cast ==
- Claire Foy as Margaret Campbell, Duchess of Argyll
- Paul Bettany as Ian Campbell, 11th Duke of Argyll
- Julia Davis as Maureen Guinness, Marchioness of Dufferin and Ava
- Richard McCabe as George Whigham
- Sophia Myles as Louise Campbell, Duchess of Argyll
- Phoebe Nicholls as Helen Whigham
- Amanda Drew as Yvonne MacPherson
- Jonathan Aris as John Wheatley, Lord Wheatley
- Oliver Chris as George Emslie QC
- Richard Goulding as Charles Jauncey, advocate
- Timothy Renouf as Peter Combe
- Nicholas Rowe as Ian Fraser QC
- Camilla Rutherford as Diana Napier
- Mitchell Robertson as Lennox
- Sophie Ward as Janet Kidd
- Katherine Manners as Jane Corby Whigham
- Miles Jupp as Dr. Ivor Griffiths
- Albertine Kotting McMillan as Lady Jeanne Campbell
- Daniel Burt as Ian Campbell, Marquess of Lorne

== Production ==
In March 2021, it was announced that Claire Foy and Paul Bettany had been cast in the lead roles and that Sarah Phelps would write and executive produce, with Anne Sewitsky directing and executive producing.

The series was filmed in Scotland and England, including at Scotland's Inveraray Castle (home of the Duke of Argyll), Glen Etive in the Scottish Highlands, Edinburgh's Parliament House, the Sheraton Grand London Park Lane Hotel, Kimpton Fitzroy London Hotel, Goldsmiths' Hall in London, and the Rivoli Ballroom in London.

== Episodes ==
No.	Title	Directed by	Written by	Original release date	U.K. viewers (millions)
1	"Episode 1"	Anne Sewitsky	Sarah Phelps	26 December 2021	6.96
2	"Episode 2"	Anne Sewitsky	Sarah Phelps	27 December 2021	5.48
3	"Episode 3"	Anne Sewitsky	Sarah Phelps	28 December 2021	5.30

== Release ==
The series premiered in the United Kingdom on BBC One on 26 December 2021, and released in the United States, Canada, Australia, and New Zealand on Prime Video on 22 April 2022.

In the United States, Amazon released A Very British Scandal as the second season of A Very English Scandal.

== Critical reception ==
Lucy Mangan of The Guardian gave the series five out of five stars, praising the writing and casting of the leads, as well as the portrayal of Margaret Campbell as an independent woman but not as a heroic figure. Ed Cumming of The Independent also gave the series five out of five stars, writing that Foy and Bettany are "both exceptional." Carol Midgley of The Times was less complimentary, awarding three out of five stars, but also praising Foy. Anita Singh of The Daily Telegraph gave it two out of five stars, criticising the shift in tone and style from A Very English Scandal, and feeling that it failed to make Margaret a sympathetic character.

== Awards and nominations ==
Year	Award	Category	Nominee	Result	Ref.
2022	Broadcast Press Guild Award	Best Drama Mini-Series	A Very British Scandal	Won	
2022	Broadcast Press Guild Award	Best Actress	Claire Foy	Won	
2022	Broadcast Press Guild Award	Best Writer	Sarah Phelps	Nominated	
2022	British Academy Television Awards	Best Costume Design	Ian Fulcher	Nominated	
2022	British Academy Television Awards	Best Editing: Fiction	Dominic Strevens	Nominated	
2022	British Academy Television Awards	Best Make-Up & Hair Design	Catherine Scoble	Nominated	
2022	British Academy Television Awards	Best Sound: Fiction	Sound Team	Won	
2022	Primetime Emmy Awards	Outstanding Music Composition for a Limited or Anthology Series, Movie or Special	Nathan Barr (for "Episode 1")	Nominated	
2022	Set Decorators Society of America Awards	Best Achievement in Décor/Design of a Television Movie or Limited Series	Philippa Hart and Christina Moore	Nominated	
