= Eleanor Campbell, Duchess of Argyll =

British noblewoman (born 1973)

Her Grace The Duchess of Argyll DStJ
- Born: Eleanor Mary Cadbury; 26 January 1973 (age 53); London, England
- Residence: Inveraray Castle
- Spouse: The 13th Duke of Argyll (m. 2002)
- Issue: Archie Campbell, Marquess of Lorne; Lord Rory Campbell; Lady Charlotte Campbell
- Parents: Peter Cadbury; Sally Strouvelle

Eleanor Mary Campbell, Duchess of Argyll DStJ (née Cadbury; born 26 January 1973), is a British noblewoman, and Prior of the Order of St John's Priory of Scotland. A member of the Cadbury family, she is the wife of the 13th Duke of Argyll.

== Biography ==
Eleanor Mary Cadbury was born on 26 January 1973 in the London Borough of Merton to Peter Hugh George Cadbury (born 8 June 1943) and his wife, Sally (née Strouvelle; 1945-2021), who married in 1969.

Through her father, she is a great-great-granddaughter of George Cadbury, and a great-great-great-granddaughter of John Cadbury the founder of the Cadbury chocolate company. She has a younger brother, Simon Charles (born 1975).

== Family ==
On 8 June 2002, she married Torquhil Campbell, 13th Duke of Argyll, at St. Mary's Church, in Fairford, Gloucestershire.

The Duke and Duchess have three children:

- Archibald Friedrich Campbell, Marquess of Lorne (born London, 9 March 2004), known as Archie Lorne; he served as a Page of Honour to Queen Elizabeth II from 2015 to 2018.
- Lord Rory James Campbell (born London, 3 February 2006)
- Lady Charlotte Mary Campbell (born London, 29 October 2008)

The Duchess of Argyll is currently Prior of the Order of St John's Priory of Scotland. Appointed on 24 June 2021, Argyll is the Priory's first woman Prior.

Argyll is a patroness of the Royal Caledonian Ball, president of the Georgian Group, patroness of Richmond's Hope, First Aid 4 Gambia, a board member of the Historic Houses Association, and founder of Best of the West music festival.

== Honours ==
- 2021: Dame of Justice Venerable Order of Saint John (DStJ)
