= Iona Campbell, Duchess of Argyll =

Scottish noblewoman (1945–2024)

Her Grace The Duchess of Argyll
- Born: Iona Mary Colquhoun; 22 June 1945; Edinburgh, Scotland
- Died: 22 February 2024 (aged 78); Lochgilphead, Argyll and Bute, Scotland
- Spouse: Ian Campbell, 12th Duke of Argyll (m. 1964; died 2001)
- Issue: Torquhil Campbell, 13th Duke of Argyll; Lady Louise Burrell
- Parents: Ivar Colquhoun; Kathleen Nimmo Duncan

Iona Mary Campbell, Duchess of Argyll (née Colquhoun; 22 June 1945 – 22 February 2024) was a Scottish noblewoman. She was married to the 12th Duke of Argyll from 1964 until his death in 2001, after which she was known as the Dowager Duchess of Argyll.

== Biography ==
Iona Mary Colquhoun was born in 1945 in Edinburgh, the second child and only daughter of Ivar Colquhoun, 8th Baronet of Luss, and his wife, Kathleen (née Duncan, sister of Marjorie Grimston, Countess of Verulam). She had two brothers, Torquhil and Malcolm.

On 4 July 1964, she married Ian Campbell, the then-Marquess of Lorne, at St Giles' Cathedral in Edinburgh. They had two children:

- Torquhil Ian Campbell, 13th Duke of Argyll (born 1968). Married to Eleanor Cadbury on 8 June 2002 at St Mary's Church, Fairford. Their children are:
  - Archie Frederick Campbell, Marquess of Lorne (born 2004)
  - Lord Rory James Campbell (born 2006)
  - Lady Charlotte Mary Campbell (born 2008)
- Lady Louise Iona Campbell (born 1972). Married to Anthony Merrik Burrell (born 10 January 1969, died 2 March 2022) on 18 April 1998 at St Giles' Cathedral. Their children are:
  - Teale Iona Burrell (born 11 February 2005)
  - Albert Westray Burrell (born 4 February 2009)

Argyll and her daughter-in-law were patronesses of the Royal Caledonian Ball.

Argyll died on 22 February 2024, at the age of 78.
