= Douglas baronets of Maxwell (1786) =

Escutcheon of the Douglas baronets of Maxwell

The Douglas baronetcy of Maxwell, Roxburghshire (also of Springwood Park in the same county) was created 17 June 1786 in the Baronetage of Great Britain for James Douglas, younger son of George Douglas of Friarshaw, a naval officer and politician. For a period it was the Scott-Douglas baronetcy.

== Douglas baronets, of Maxwell (1786) ==
- Sir James Douglas, 1st Baronet (1703 – 2 November 1787) MP for Orkney & Shetland 1754–1768
- Sir George Douglas, 2nd Baronet (1 March 1754 – 4 June 1821) MP for Roxburghshire 1784–1806
- Sir John James Scott-Douglas, 3rd Baronet (18 July 1792 – 24 January 1836)
- Sir George Henry Scott-Douglas, 4th Baronet (19 June 1825 – 26 June 1885) MP for Roxburghshire 1874–1880
- Sir George Brisbane Douglas, 5th Baronet (22 December 1856 – 22 June 1935)
- Sir James Louis Fitzroy Scott Douglas, 6th Baronet (24 October 1930 – 16 July 1969). He left no heir, and the title was extinct on his death.

== Notes ==
Baronetage of Great Britain
Preceded by Colquhoun baronets	Douglas baronets of Maxwell; 27 June 1786	Succeeded by Shirley baronets
