= Torquhil Campbell, 13th Duke of Argyll =

Scottish peer (born 1968)

His Grace The Duke of Argyll
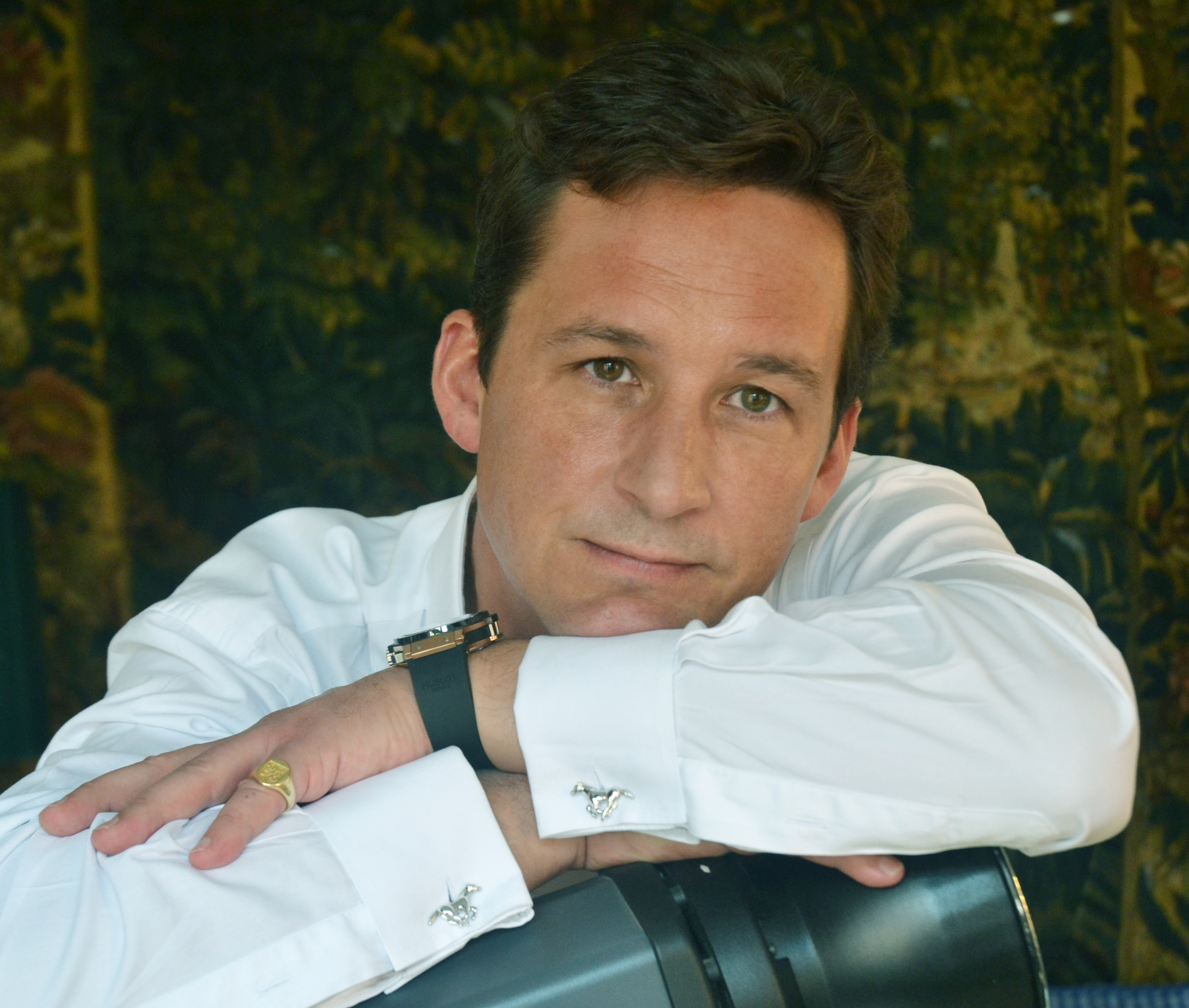
- Portrait by Allan Warren, 2013
- Known for: Chief of Clan Campbell, elephant polo, landowning
- Born: Torquhil Ian Campbell; 29 May 1968 (age 58); London, England
- Residence: Inveraray Castle
- Spouse: Eleanor Cadbury (m. 2002)
- Issue: Archie Campbell, Marquess of Lorne; Lord Rory Campbell; Lady Charlotte Campbell
- Parents: Ian Campbell, 12th Duke of Argyll; Iona Colquhoun

Torquhil Ian Campbell, 13th and 6th Duke of Argyll (born 29 May 1968), styled as Earl of Campbell before 1973 and as Marquess of Lorne between 1973 and 2001, is a Scottish peer.

The family's main seat is Inveraray Castle, although the Duke and Duchess spend time at other residences, including one in London.

== Biography ==
The Duke is the elder child and only son of Ian Campbell, 12th and 5th Duke of Argyll and Iona Mary Colquhoun, daughter of Sir Ivar Colquhoun, 8th Baronet. He was educated at Craigflower Preparatory School, Cargilfield Preparatory School, Glenalmond College, and the Royal Agricultural College, Cirencester. At the last of these, he trained as a chartered surveyor.

He served as a Page of Honour to Queen Elizabeth II from 1981 to 1983. He became a sales agent, salesman and company manager. Among his 29 titles are: Master of the Royal Household of Scotland, Admiral of the Western Coasts and Isles, and the chief of Clan Campbell (Scottish Gaelic: MacCailein Mòr).

He is the captain of Scotland's national elephant polo team, which won the 2004 and 2005 World Elephant Polo Association World Championships. He represents Pernod Ricard distillers, promoting Scotch whiskies. He is a Freeman of the City of London and a Liveryman of the Worshipful Company of Distillers.

== Marriage and children ==
On 8 June 2002 at St Mary's Church, Fairford, Gloucestershire, the Duke married Eleanor Cadbury, a member of the Cadbury chocolate family. She is the daughter of Peter Hugh George Cadbury (previously chairman of Close Brothers Corporate Finance) and his wife Sally Strouvelle.

The Duke and Duchess have three children:

- Archibald Friedrich Campbell, Marquess of Lorne (born London, 9 March 2004), known as Archie Lorne. He served as a Page of Honour to Queen Elizabeth II from 2015–2018.
- Lord Rory James Campbell (born London, 3 February 2006)
- Lady Charlotte Mary Campbell (born London, 29 October 2008).

The Duchess is a Patroness of the Royal Caledonian Ball and the president of The Georgian Group.

== Arms ==
Coat of arms of Torquhil Campbell, 13th Duke of Argyll
Coronet The coronet of a duke Crest A Boar's Head fesswise erased Or armed Argent and langued Gules Escutcheon Quarterly: 1 and 4th, Gyronny of eight Or and Sable (Campbell); 2 and 3rd, Argent a Lymphad Sable sails furled flag and pennants flying and oars in action proper (the Lordship of Lorne); in saltire behind the shield a Baton Gules powdered with Thistles Or ensigned with an Imperial Crown proper thereon the Crest of Scotland (as Hereditary Great Master of the Household in Scotland) and a Sword proper hilted and pommelled Or (as Hereditary Lord Justice General of Scotland) Supporters On either side a Lion guardant Gules Motto Ne Obliviscaris (Forget not)

== See also ==
- Torquil, for background on the name Torquhil

Court offices
Preceded by Viscount Carlow	Page of Honour; 1981–1983	Succeeded by Hugh Crossley
Peerage of Scotland
Preceded by Ian Campbell	Duke of Argyll; 2001–present	Incumbent
Peerage of the United Kingdom
Preceded by Ian Campbell	Duke of Argyll; 2001–present	Incumbent
