= Charles Francis Sweeny =

American businessman and socialite (1909–1993)

Charles Francis Sweeny (October 3, 1909 or 1910, Scranton, Pennsylvania – March 11, 1993) was an American businessman and socialite who played a major role in the formation of the Eagle Squadrons, composed mostly of volunteer American pilots eager to fight in the Royal Air Force prior to the United States entering into World War II.

== Early life and family ==
Sweeny's paternal grandfather, also named Charles Sweeny, was the son of poor Irish immigrants; he made his fortune in mining in the Coeur d'Alene region in Idaho. His father, Robert, was a successful lawyer in Los Angeles, before moving to New York City in 1916 to pursue business opportunities and investments, and enlarge the family fortune. One uncle was Charles Sweeny (1882–1963), a soldier of fortune and officer in various armies.

He and his younger brother Robert grew up in Manhattan. The brothers attended Loyola School in New York City and Canterbury School in New Milford, Connecticut. The family regularly vacationed in Europe. Robert Sweeny Sr. either joined or in 1926 founded the Federated Trust and Finance Corporation of London, and by the late 1920s, had homes in Wimbledon and Le Touquet.

Both brothers were excellent athletes and avid golfers. They took golf lessons in Le Touquet and occasionally played with Edward, Prince of Wales, another frequent visitor to Le Touquet. Charles lost in the quarterfinals of the 1926 Boys Amateur Championship, and both he and his brother competed in 1927.

Charles was accepted by Yale University, but chose Wadham College, Oxford. He was a member of the Oxford golf team and in 1933 stayed with his friend, the Prince of Wales, ahead of the 1933 Varsity Match against Cambridge.

== First marriage ==
After graduating, he was attracted to the debutante Margaret Whigham (1912–1993). Whigham, the only child of a Scottish millionaire, converted to Sweeny's Catholicism and on February 21, 1933, they were married at the Brompton Oratory, London. Such was the publicity surrounding her Norman Hartnell wedding dress that traffic in Knightsbridge was blocked for three hours.

They had three children: a daughter who was stillborn at eight months in late 1933; daughter Frances Helen (1937–2024), who married Charles Manners, 10th Duke of Rutland, and son Brian Charles (1940–2021). Before these pregnancies, Margaret suffered eight miscarriages.

The Sweenys divorced in 1947. (Margaret became the third wife of Ian Campbell, 11th Duke of Argyll, on 22 March 1951; their marriage ended in a scandalous divorce in 1963 on grounds of her adultery.)

== Business ==
Shortly before Sweeny's marriage, his father obtained for him a position at Charterhouse Investment Trust, a merchant bank. In the late 1930s, he joined his father's firm, Federated Trust.

== Second World War ==
With the outbreak of the Second World War, he formed a Home Guard unit, the First Motorised Squadron, composed of American expatriates in London. Then, while his soldier-of-fortune uncle Charles recruited pilots from the still-neutral United States for the French Air Force, he proposed to the Air Ministry the idea of raising an American squadron for the Royal Air Force (RAF). In July 1940, the Ministry accepted his recommendation, and the first of the Eagle Squadrons, 71 Squadron, was authorized, though it was not formed until September. The squadrons were staffed by the few Americans already serving in the RAF and new recruits. The two Sweenys recruited pilots in the United States and paid for their travel to Canada and from there to Britain. The younger Sweeny designed the shoulder patch for the uniform; it featured an eagle, hence the name "Eagle Squadrons".

== Later life ==
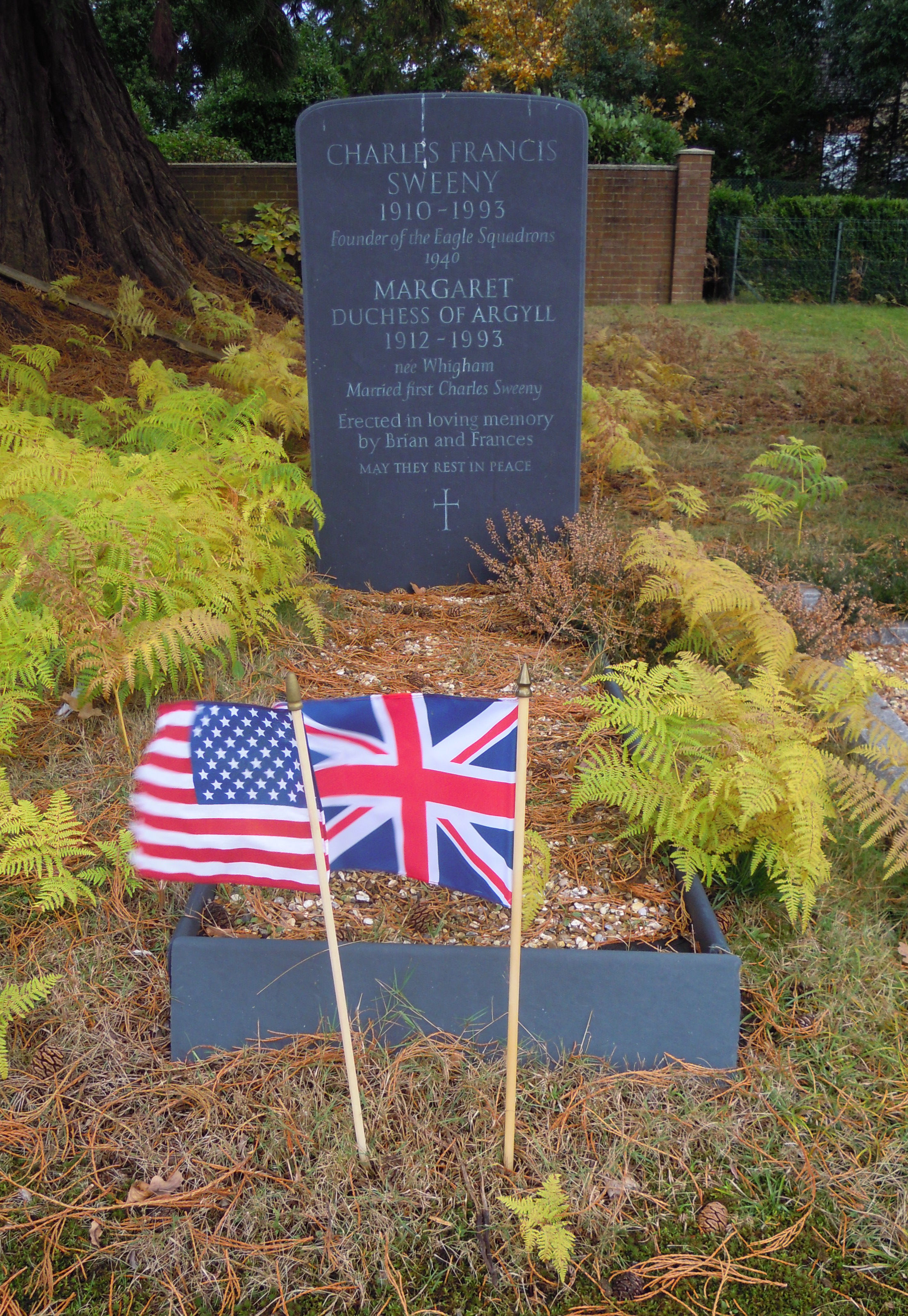
Grave of Charles Francis Sweeny and his first wife Margaret, Duchess of Argyll, in Brookwood Cemetery, Surrey

Sweeny married American fashion model Arden Sneed (born c. 1932) in September 1957. He obtained a divorce in 1966 on the grounds of desertion; they had no children.

He lived in Mayfair for the last 63 years of his life.

He is buried in Brookwood Cemetery (Plot 119) in a grave shared with his first wife and next to his brother Robert.
