= Charles Coster =

American soldier and public official

Charles Robert Coster (December 18, 1839 – December 23, 1888) was an American soldier and public official, who is best known for commanding a brigade at the Battle of Gettysburg.

== Early life ==
Coster was born in New York City. He was the son of John H. Coster and Sarah Adeline (née Boardman) Coster, He was also a first cousin of New York clubman, Harry Coster. His father, better known as a playboy before a businessman, was one of twelve children that married into many prominent families.

His grandfather, John Gerard Coster, came from Haarlem in the Netherlands to the United States shortly after the Revolutionary War and founded the family fortune through the mercantile firm, "Henry A. & John G. Coster".

== Military career ==
On April 17, 1861, just five days after the firing on Fort Sumter, he enlisted as a private in the 7th New York Militia, one of the first regiments to come to the defense of Washington, D.C. at the outbreak of the Civil War. He later enlisted in 1861 at age 24 as a first lieutenant in 12th U.S. Infantry. He served in Brig. Gen. George Sykes's division of V Corps in the Seven Days Battles, being commended by his superiors for his conduct at the Battle of Gaines' Mill on June 27, 1862.

On October 8, 1862, Coster was named colonel of the recently organized 134th New York Volunteer Infantry. By December 31, 1862, the regiment belonged to Col. Orland Smith's 2nd Brigade of Maj. Gen. Adolph von Steinwehr's 2nd Division, XI Corps, Army of the Potomac. Coster's regiment participated in the Battle of Chancellorsville under Brig. Gen. Francis C. Barlow, who had been appointed brigade commander in place of Smith. During May 1863, Coster's regiment joined the 1st Brigade, 2nd Division, under Col. Adolphus Buschbeck. When Buschbeck went on leave on June 10, Coster became brigade commander. In that role he patrolled near Boonsboro, Maryland before marching to Gettysburg, Pennsylvania.

=== Gettysburg ===
Maj. Gen. Oliver Otis Howard kept von Steinwehr's division in reserve on the first day of the Battle of Gettysburg, July 1, 1863, positioning it on Cemetery Hill. When the Union right flank north of town began to collapse, Howard permitted von Steinwehr to send Coster's brigade to cover its retreat. These Union troops took a position just north of the town, where they were deployed in a brickyard. The brigade was attacked by superior forces from the Confederate division of Maj. Gen. Jubal Early. Coster's brigade lost most of its 597 casualties in that action. The remainder of the brigade spent the next two days supporting batteries on Cemetery Hill. Howard commended Coster and other senior commanders by name for their courage and devotion to duty in his report on Gettysburg.

=== After Gettysburg ===
Later in 1863, Coster resigned his regimental command. On May 18, 1864, he was appointed a provost marshal for the State of New York to serve the Board of Enrollment. Coster resigned that position on April 30, 1865. Thereafter he lived in New York City. On February 28, 1882, he became a federal Pension Agent for the city, resigning effective December 1, 1885. He was also a member of the Grand Army of the Republic.

== Personal life ==
In 1864, Coster was married to Marie Bay James (1841–1904), Marie was the daughter of Augustus J. James of Albany, and the niece of theologian Henry James Sr., which made Marie a first cousin of author Henry James, psychologist William James, and diarist Alice James. Together, Marie and Charles were the parents of four children:

- Charles Coster (1866-1908) - married Helen Louise Anthon (1866-1951). 1 child
- William Bay Coster (1867–1918), a banker. - married Maria Griswold Gray (1868-1947). 3 children
- Adeline Boardman Coster (1871-1946) - married Henry Dickerson Steers (1865-1928). 2 children
- Elizabeth Mary Coster (1877-1946) - married Alfred Egmont Schermerhorn (1871-1932). 1 child

Coster died in New York City on December 23, 1888. He was buried on December 26, 1888.

=== Memorials ===
Coster Avenue, part of the Gettysburg Battlefield but within the town itself, has a brigade marker and three regimental monuments. A mural painting on the wall of a neighboring building commemorates the Confederate attack and Coster's defense.
