= The Georgian Group =

National authority in England and Wales

- Formation: 1937
- Headquarters: 6 Fitzroy Square, London, England
- Members: Open
- Patron: Charles III
- President: Eleanor Campbell, Duchess of Argyll
- Chairman: Paul Zisman
- Director: Dr Anya Lucas
- Website: georgiangroup.org.uk

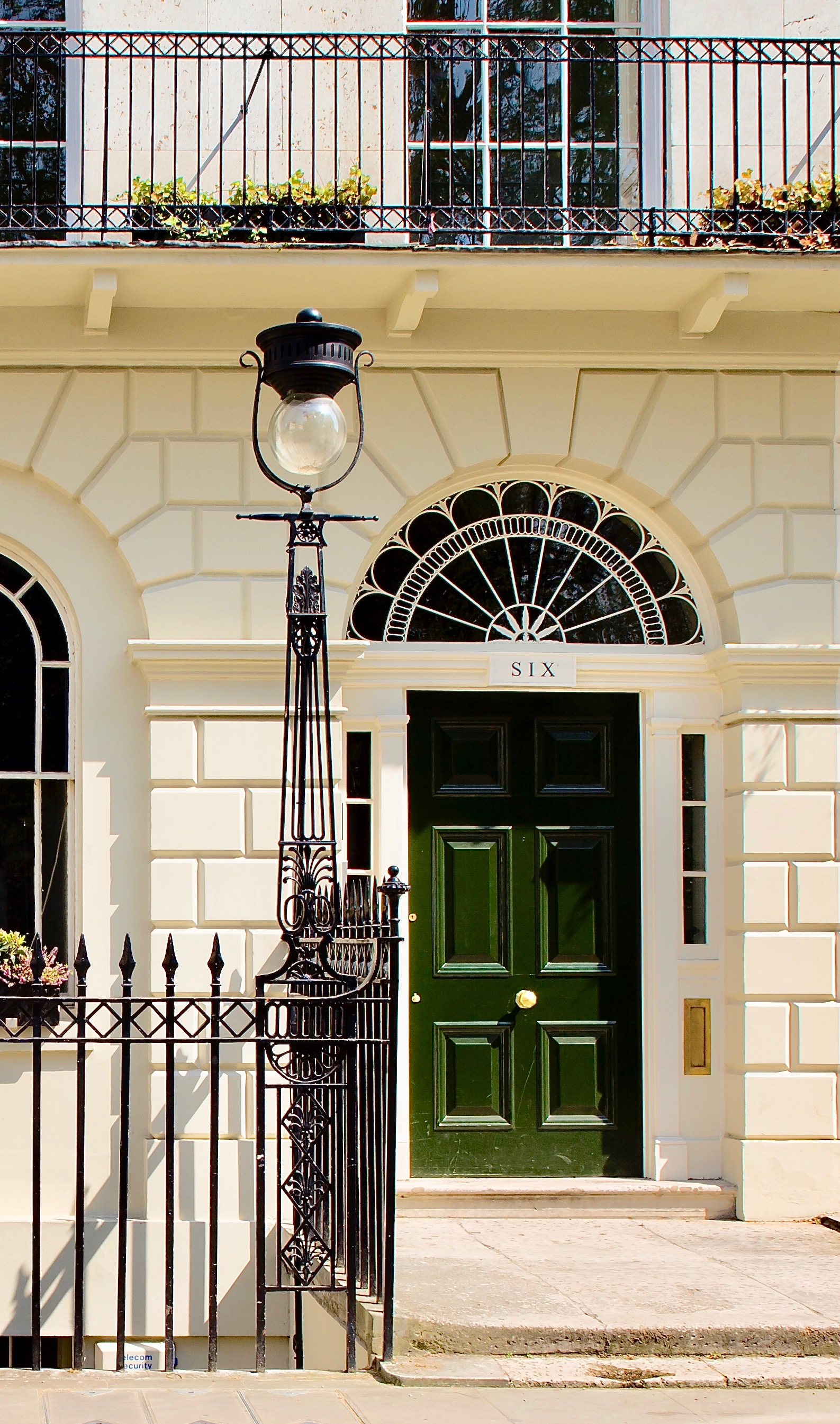
Entrance to 6 Fitzroy Square

The Georgian Group is a British charity, and the national authority on Georgian architecture built between 1700 and 1837 in England and Wales. As one of the National Amenity Societies, The Georgian Group is a statutory consultee on alterations to listed buildings, and by law must be notified of any work to a relevant listed building which involves any element of demolition.

== History ==
Founded in 1937 by Lord Derwent, Robert Byron and the journalist Douglas Goldring (who went on to become the first secretary), the Group was originally part of the Society for the Protection of Ancient Buildings. Sir Nikolaus Pevsner, the poet and author Sir John Betjeman, Sir John Summerson, Robert Byron, the architect Sir Albert Richardson, Oliver Messel, and Sir Osbert Sitwell were among its most prominent early active members. Since 1971, The Georgian Group has been a national amenity society.

== Work ==
The Georgian Group acts as a statutory consultee in the planning process in England and Wales, when consideration is being given to proposals to alter or demolish listed buildings dating, in whole or in part, from between 1700 and 1837. The Victorian Society plays a similar role for buildings built between 1837 and 1914. It is notified of many thousands of applications each year. In Scotland the Architectural Heritage Society of Scotland, formerly the Georgian Group of Edinburgh, is the relevant statutory consultee.

The Group has a similar role in the Church of England and Church in Wales faculty systems, and also advises the internal planning bodies of the Methodist, Roman Catholic, Baptist and United Reformed Church, on alterations to listed churches and chapels, including on the re-ordering or removal of historic fixtures and fittings.

Its present headquarters is at 6 Fitzroy Square, London W1, a large Robert Adam town house which it has restored. Its extensive library and an important collection of architectural watercolours and engravings, the Pardoe Collection, are housed within its headquarters and are available for public examination by appointment.

Since the early 1980s The Georgian Group has employed specialist regional caseworkers to undertake its advisory work within the planning process. Any member of the public can ask the Group for assistance in preventing the destruction of a Georgian building, although the Group's resources are limited. There are four casework regions: London and the South East, Central and Northern England, South West England and the Cotswolds, and Wales. The caseworkers are responsible to a Senior Caseworker and a committee of expert advisers. John Martin Robinson was the founder of its specialist Casework Committee, a group of architects, architectural historians and conservation professionals who regularly meet to discuss controversial development schemes. The Georgian Group also has specialist representatives on conservation advisory panels in many English local authority areas.

== Grants ==
The Georgian Group's small grants fund for the repair and restoration of Georgian buildings, monuments and fixtures and fittings is called the F. E. Cleary Heritage Fund (commonly known as The Cleary Fund). Grants are normally awarded annually in October.

== Publications ==
The Group also publishes works on the care and restoration of Georgian buildings and interiors.

== See also ==
- Irish Georgian Society
- The Twentieth Century Society
