= Ian Campbell, 12th Duke of Argyll =

Scottish nobleman (1937–2001)

His Grace The Duke of Argyll KStJ DL FRSA
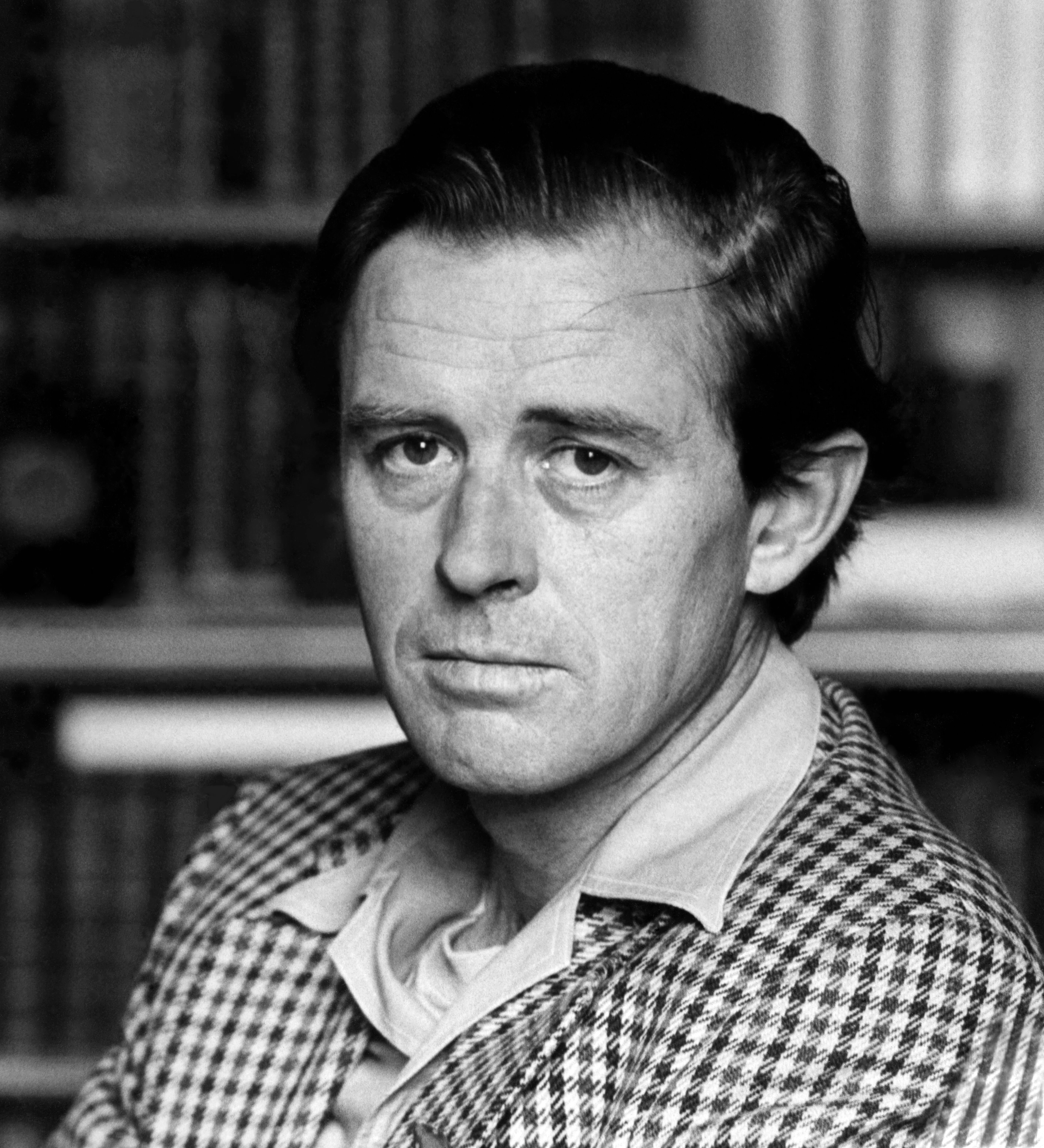
- Portrait by Allan Warren, 1986
- Predecessor: Ian Campbell, 11th Duke of Argyll
- Successor: Torquhil Campbell, 13th Duke of Argyll
- Born: 28 August 1937; Chelsea, London, England
- Died: 21 April 2001 (aged 63); London, England
- Buried: 27 April 2001; Inishail, Argyll and Bute, Scotland
- Spouse: Iona Mary Colquhoun (m. 1964)
- Issue: Torquhil Campbell, 13th Duke of Argyll; Lady Louise Burrell
- Parents: Ian Campbell, 11th Duke of Argyll; Louise Hollingsworth Morris Clews
- Occupation: Scottish peer, businessman, and Chief of Clan Campbell

Member of the House of Lords Lord Temporal
- In office 7 April 1973 – 11 November 1999 as a hereditary peer
- Preceded by: Ian Campbell, 11th Duke of Argyll
- Succeeded by: Seat abolished

Ian Campbell, 12th and 5th Duke of Argyll, KStJ, DL, FRSA (28 August 1937 – 21 April 2001), styled Marquess of Lorne between 1949 and 1973, was a Scottish peer and Chief of Clan Campbell. He was the 12th Duke of Argyll in the Peerage of Scotland, 5th Duke of Argyll in the Peerage of the United Kingdom and Lord Lieutenant of Argyll and Bute.

== Early life and education ==
Argyll was the son of Ian Campbell, 11th Duke of Argyll, and his second wife, Louise Hollingsworth Morris Clews.

He was brought up in Portugal and France, educated at Institut Le Rosey in Switzerland and Glenalmond College in Scotland before going on to McGill University in Canada where he studied engineering.

== Later life ==
In 1953, he was made a Fellow of the Royal Society for the Encouragement of Arts, Manufactures and Commerce. He served with the Argyll and Sutherland Highlanders, earning the rank of captain. Following his military service he worked in banking, then spent four years as a sales executive with Rank Xerox Export, regularly travelling behind the Iron Curtain.

In 1968 he took over running the dukedom's Inveraray Castle estate for his father. On the death of his father in 1973, Argyll became a member of the board of directors of three distilleries and in 1977 became Chairman of Beinn Bhuidhe Holdings Ltd. in 1977. He was invested as a Knight of the Order of St. John in 1975.

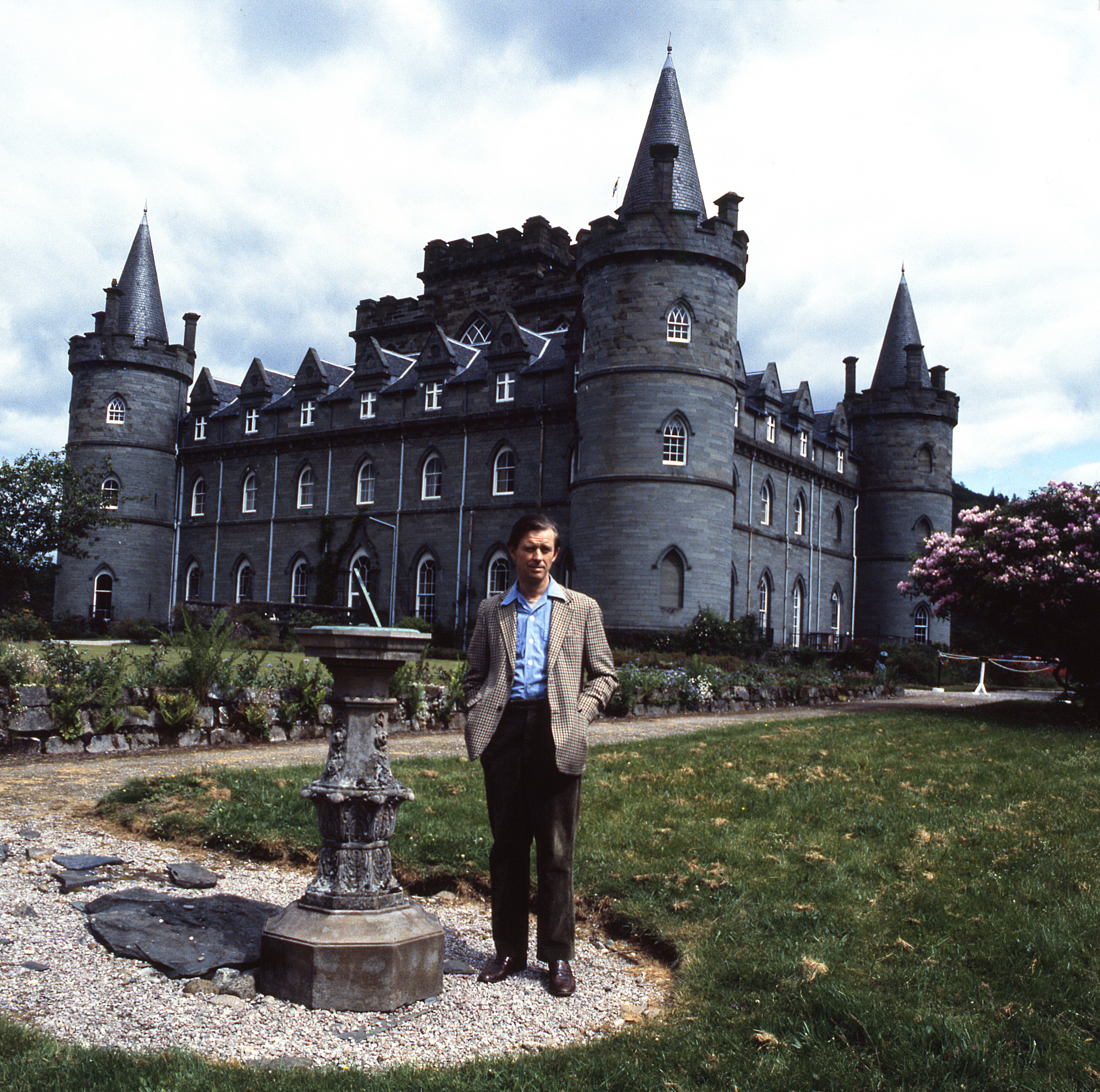

== Marriage and children ==
Argyll married Iona Mary Colquhoun, daughter of Sir Ivar Colquhoun, 8th Baronet, in 1964. They lived at Inveraray Castle in Argyll. The couple had two children:

- Torquhil Ian Campbell, 13th Duke of Argyll (born 29 May 1968)
- Lady Louise Iona Campbell (born 26 October 1972), married Anthony Merrik Burrell in 1998. Her husband died in 2022.

Iona, Duchess of Argyll, was a patroness of the Royal Caledonian Ball.. Lady Louise, their daughter, is currently a patroness.

== Death ==
The duke died of heart failure during surgery in 2001 at the age of 63. While most Dukes and Duchesses of Argyll are buried at Kilmun Parish Church, the 12th Duke and his father, the 11th Duke, both chose to be buried on the island of Inishail in Loch Awe.

== In popular culture ==
In the 2021 mini-series A Very British Scandal, Campbell was played by Daniel Burt.

== Armorial bearings ==
Coat of arms of Ian Campbell, 12th Duke of Argyll
Coronet The coronet of a duke Crest A Boar's Head fesswise erased Or armed Argent and langued Gules Escutcheon Quarterly: 1st and 4th, Gyronny of eight Or and Sable (Campbell); 2nd and 3rd, Argent a Lymphad Sable sails furled flag and pennants flying and oars in action proper (the Lordship of Lorne); in saltire behind the shield a Baton Gules powdered with Thistles Or ensigned with an Imperial Crown proper thereon the Crest of Scotland (as Hereditary Great Master of the Household in Scotland) and a Sword proper hilted and pommelled Or (as Hereditary Lord Justice General of Scotland) Supporters On either side a Lion guardant Gules Motto Ne Obliviscaris (Forget not)

== Ancestry ==
Ancestors of Ian Campbell, 12th Duke of Argyll

16. George Campbell, 8th Duke of Argyll
8. Lord Walter Campbell
17. Lady Elizabeth Sutherland-Leveson-Gower
4. Douglas Campbell
18. John Milns
9. Olivia Milns
2. Ian Campbell, 11th Duke of Argyll
20. John Lawrence
10. John Lawrence
21. Margaretta Quick
5. Aimée Lawrence
11. Emily La Farge
1. Ian Campbell, 12th Duke of Argyll
24. James Clews
12. Henry Clews
25. Bessie Kenrick
6. Henry Clews Jr.
26. William H. Worthington
13. Lucy Worthington
27. Anna Tomlinson
3. Louise Clews
7. Louise Morris

Honorary titles
Preceded by The Marquess of Bute	Lord Lieutenant of Argyll and Bute; 1994–2001	Vacant Title next held by Kenneth MacKinnon
Peerage of Scotland
Preceded by Ian Campbell	Duke of Argyll; 1973–2001	Succeeded by Torquhil Campbell
Peerage of the United Kingdom
Preceded by Ian Campbell	Duke of Argyll; 1973–2001; Member of the House of Lords (1973–1999)	Succeeded by Torquhil Campbell
