= Ivar Colquhoun =

British nobleman (1916–2008)

Sir Ivar Iain Colquhoun, 8th Baronet, JP, DL (4 January 1916 – 31 January 2008) was a Scottish noble.

== Biography ==
=== Early life ===
Sir Ivar was the son of Sir Iain Colquhoun, 7th Baronet and his wife Geraldine Bryde (Dinah) Tennant. He was educated at Eton.

=== Career ===
He was working at a lumber camp in Finland at the outbreak of World War II, and joined a Territorial Army battalion of the Argyll and Sutherland Highlanders as a private soldier. When the Soviet Union invaded Finland in November 1939, he was seconded to the 5th (Ski) Battalion Scots Guards. This was disbanded after Finland was forced to accept Russian terms in March 1940. In April 1940 he was commissioned as a second lieutenant in the Royal Artillery, and served in Libya during the siege of Tobruk, later to become the subject of some of his drier reminiscences. On 2 September 1944, as a war substantive lieutenant, he was attached to the Grenadier Guards, to serve as a liaison officer, and subsequently as a captain in the Coldstream Guards.

He served as a Justice of the Peace for over twenty years. He was a deputy lieutenant for Dunbartonshire and for twenty years was the chairman of the British Sailors' Society.

=== Title ===
He was the eighth baronet and the 30th Laird of Luss. As a member of the Standing Council of Scottish Chiefs, he made regular appearances at clan gatherings and clan games and endorsed the clan museum. From 1949 until 1982, he was chieftain of the Luss Highland Games in July.

=== Personal life ===
He was married in 1943 to Kathleen Nimmo Duncan (died 17 April 2007), the second daughter of Walter Atholl Duncan of London. His wife's sister Marjorie Ray Duncan had married the 6th Earl of Verulam in 1938.

Sir Ivar Colquhoun of Luss and Lady Colquhoun had three children:

- Torquhil Colquhoun, younger of Luss (b 1944, d 1963);
- Iona Mary (1945–2024), who married the 12th Duke of Argyll (1937–2001) in 1964, and had one son (the present Duke) and one daughter; and
- Malcolm Rory Colquhoun (b 20 Dec 1947), 9th baronet. He was styled Malcolm Colquhoun of Luss, younger of Luss, following the death of his elder brother as the heir to the baronetcy and estate. He married for the second time in October 1989 Katharine A.H. Mears, eldest daughter of Mr and Mrs A.C. Mears, of Canberra, Australia, and has issue by her.

Baronetage of Great Britain
| Preceded by Iain Colquhoun | Baronet (of Luss); 1948–2008 | Succeeded by Malcolm Colquhoun |
