= Colquhoun baronets =

Set index for Colquhoun baronets

There have been two baronetcies created for persons with the surname Colquhoun (said "Cohoon"), one in the Baronetage of Nova Scotia and one in the Baronetage of Great Britain.

- Colquhoun baronets of Colquhoun (1625)
- Colquhoun baronets of Luss (1786)

Sir Robert Douglas, 6th Baronet during the 18th century in his Baronage gave credence to a claim of the Colquhouns of Tillyquhoun to the baronetcy of the first creation, which continued until the extinction of the line in 1838. Robert Colquhoun was in this fashion titled the 12th baronet.
