= Inveraray Castle =

Country house in Scotland, seat of the dukes of Argyll

- Inveraray, Argyll, Scotland, United Kingdom
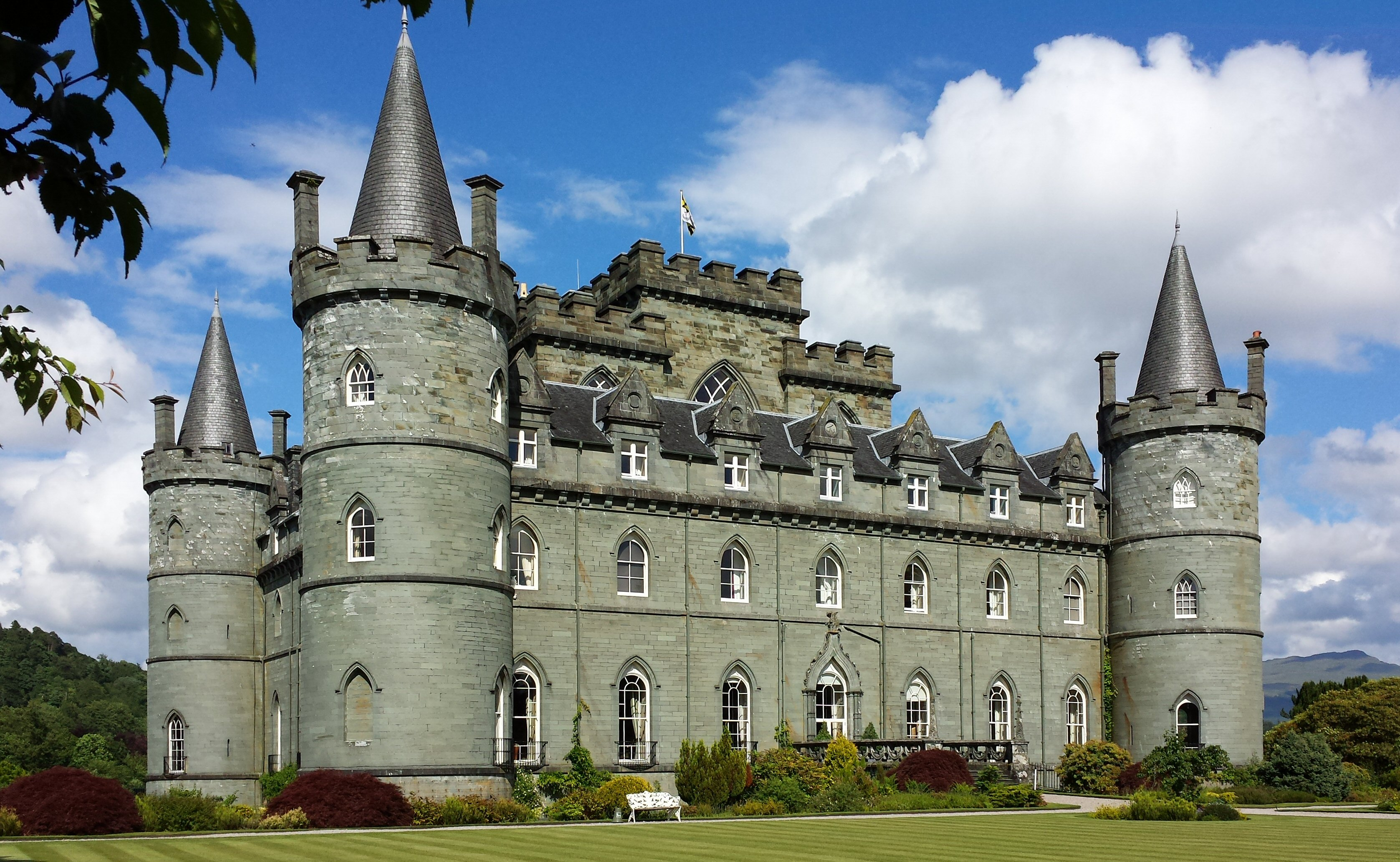
- Inveraray Castle in 2014

Site information
- Open to the public: Yes
- Website: www.inveraray-castle.com

Listed Building – Category A
- Official name: Inveraray Castle
- Designated: 20 July 1971
- Reference no.: LB11552

Inventory of Gardens and Designed Landscapes in Scotland
- Official name: Kelburn Castle
- Designated: 30 June 1987
- Reference no.: GDL00233

Location
- Shown within Scotland
- Location within Scotland
- Coordinates: 56°14′15″N 5°04′25″W
- Grid reference: grid reference NN095092

Site history
- Materials: Stone

Inveraray Castle (pronounced /ˌɪnvəˈrɛərə/ IN-vər-AIR-ə or /ˌɪnvəˈrɛəri/ IN-vər-AIR-ee; Scottish Gaelic Caisteal Inbhir Aora [ˈkʰaʃtʲəl̪ˠ iɲɪɾʲˈɯːɾə]) is a country house near Inveraray in the county of Argyll, in western Scotland, on the shore of Loch Fyne, Scotland's longest sea loch. It is one of the earliest examples of Gothic Revival architecture.

It has been the seat of the Dukes of Argyll, chiefs of Clan Campbell, since the 18th century.

== History and architecture ==
James V stayed at the old castle of Inveraray in September 1533. A new lute was bought for him in Glasgow and carried to Inveraray by his servant Troilus.

The present castle was built in the Gothic Revival style. Improvements on the estate began in 1743 by Archibald Campbell, Earl of Ilay, soon to become 3rd Duke of Argyll. The foundation stone of the new castle was laid in October 1746, and it replaced an earlier 15th-century castle.

It is one of the earliest Gothic Revival buildings, together with Strawberry Hill House. It was built of ashlar lapis ollaris. Originally, all the roofs were flat and crenellated. Later, a third floor with pitched roof and dormer windows was added on all four wings, and steep conical roofs were added to the four round towers. In the 1770s, the village of Inveraray was demolished and rebuilt a short distance away, to give the castle a more secluded setting.

Designers who worked on the new castle include William Adam and Roger Morris. The interior has a number of neoclassical rooms created later in the 18th century for the 5th Duke by Robert Mylne. These are among the rooms open to the public. James Lees-Milne was not impressed by the house when he visited it in 1943, noting the "ugly" grey stone and calling it "grim and forbidding".

In 1975, a devastating fire struck Inveraray and for some time the 12th Duke and his family lived in the castle's basement, while restorations were carried out, funded by a worldwide fundraising drive.

== Modern era ==
The castle is open to visitors. Its collection includes more than 1,300 pikes, muskets, swords and other weapons. The 13th Duke of Argyll and his family live in private apartments in the castle, which occupy two floors and are set between two of the four crenellated circular towers. Recent renovations included the installation of the house's first central heating system, powered by burning wood-chips from the family's forestry holdings. It was previously heated only by open fires.

Inveraray Castle is a Category A listed building. It is surrounded by a 16-acre (6.5-hectare) garden and an estate of 60,000 acres (24,000 hectares). Besides welcoming visitors to the castle, the estate's activities include commercial forestry, tenanted farming, wind and hydro power, and deer stalking.

== Flag ==
When the duke is in residence his banner of arms is raised above Inverary Castle. At other times the banner of arms for Clan Campbell, which appears in the 1st and 4th quarters of his arms, flies.

== In popular culture ==
The castle has featured in a number of media productions including: Downton Abbey (2012); Great Estates Scotland (2014); and Susan Calman's Secret Scotland (2020). The "Best of the West" festival, organised by the Duchess, was held at the castle each September until 2018. Other productions included An American Aristocrat's Guide to Great Estates, the BBC miniseries A Very British Scandal, and The Diplomat (2024).

The castle is reputedly haunted.

Inveraray exteriors
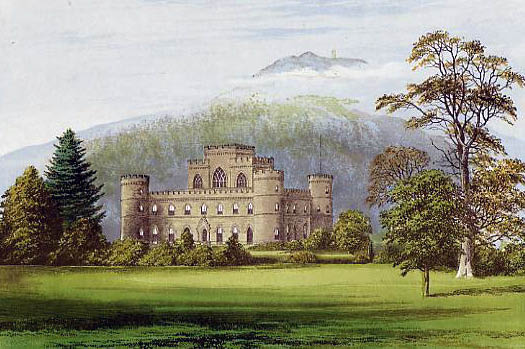
A lithograph of Inveraray Castle, 1880

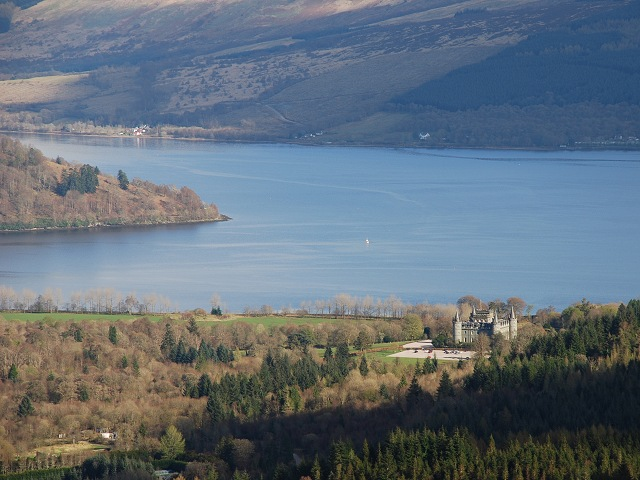
Panoramic view of Inveraray setting

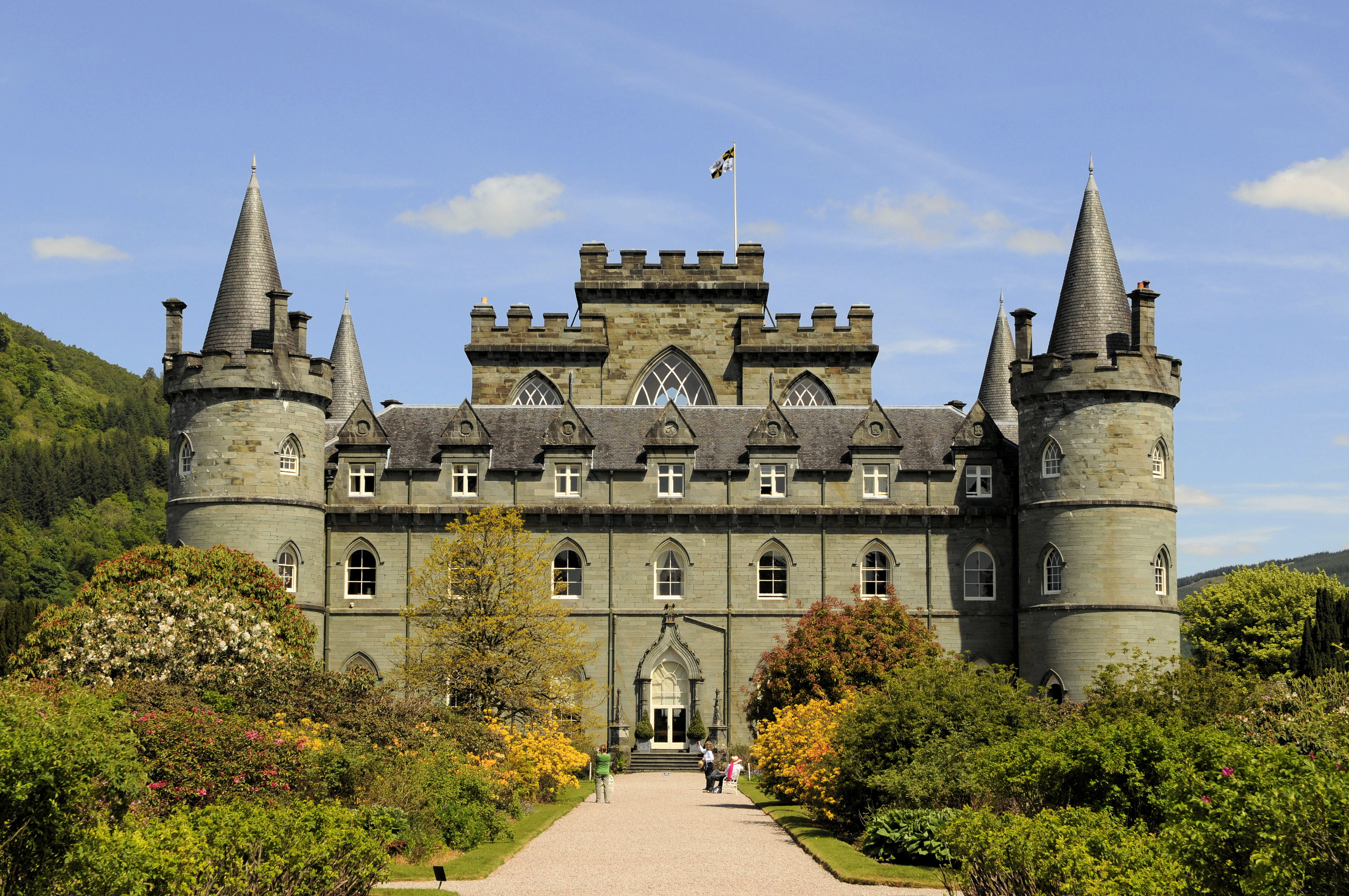
View of the facade

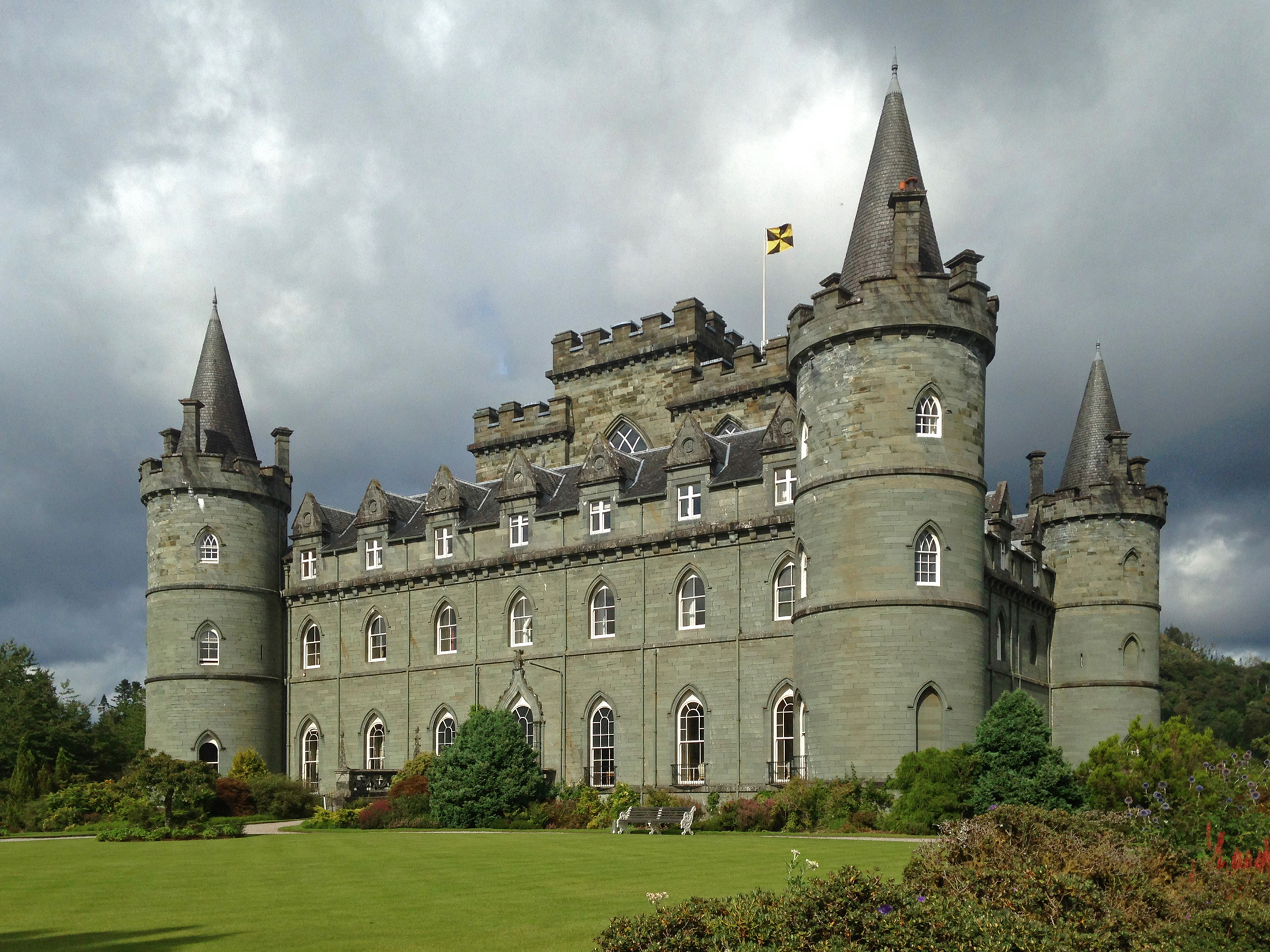
Facade on the garden

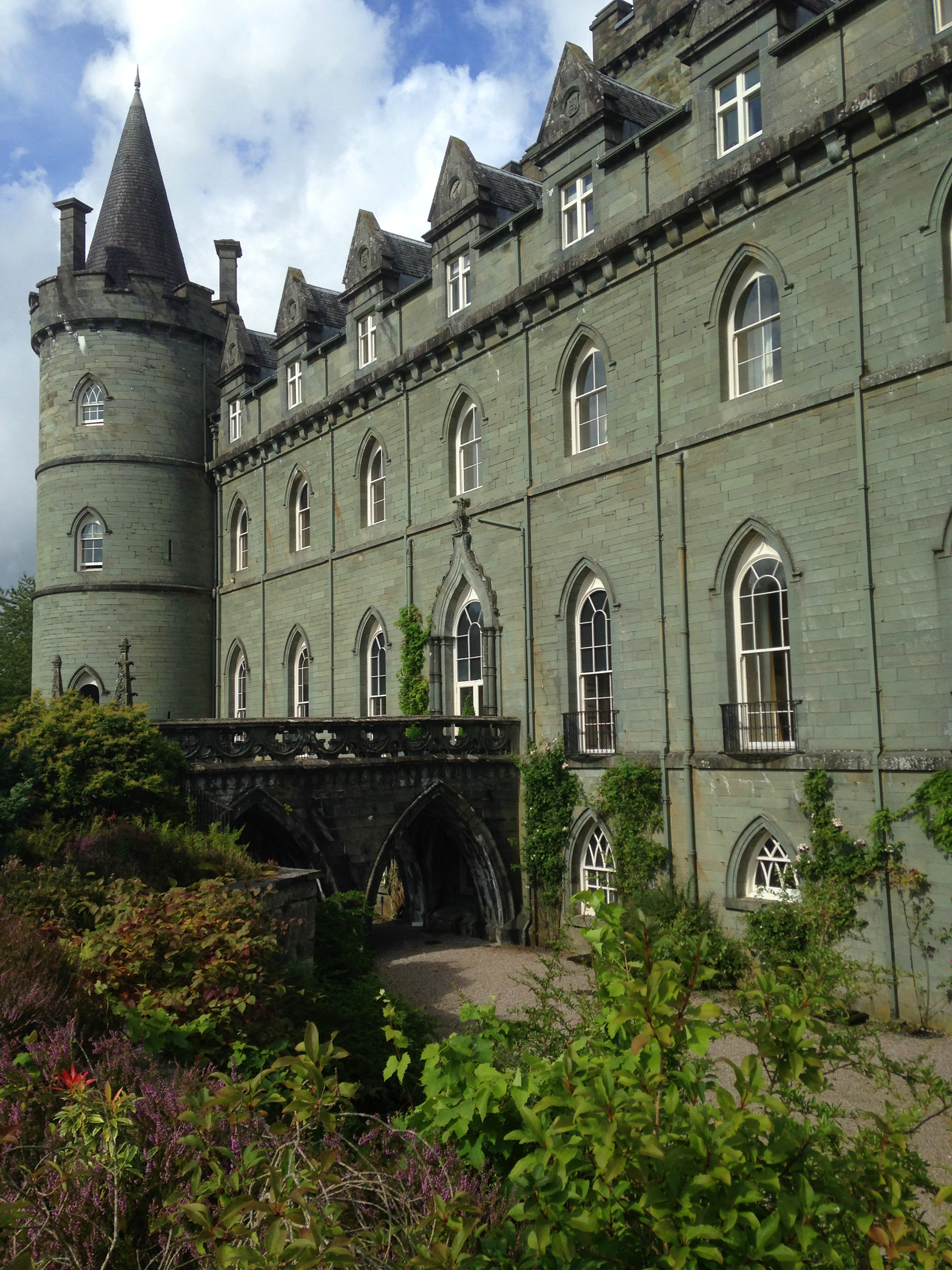
Close view of the facade
Inveraray interiors
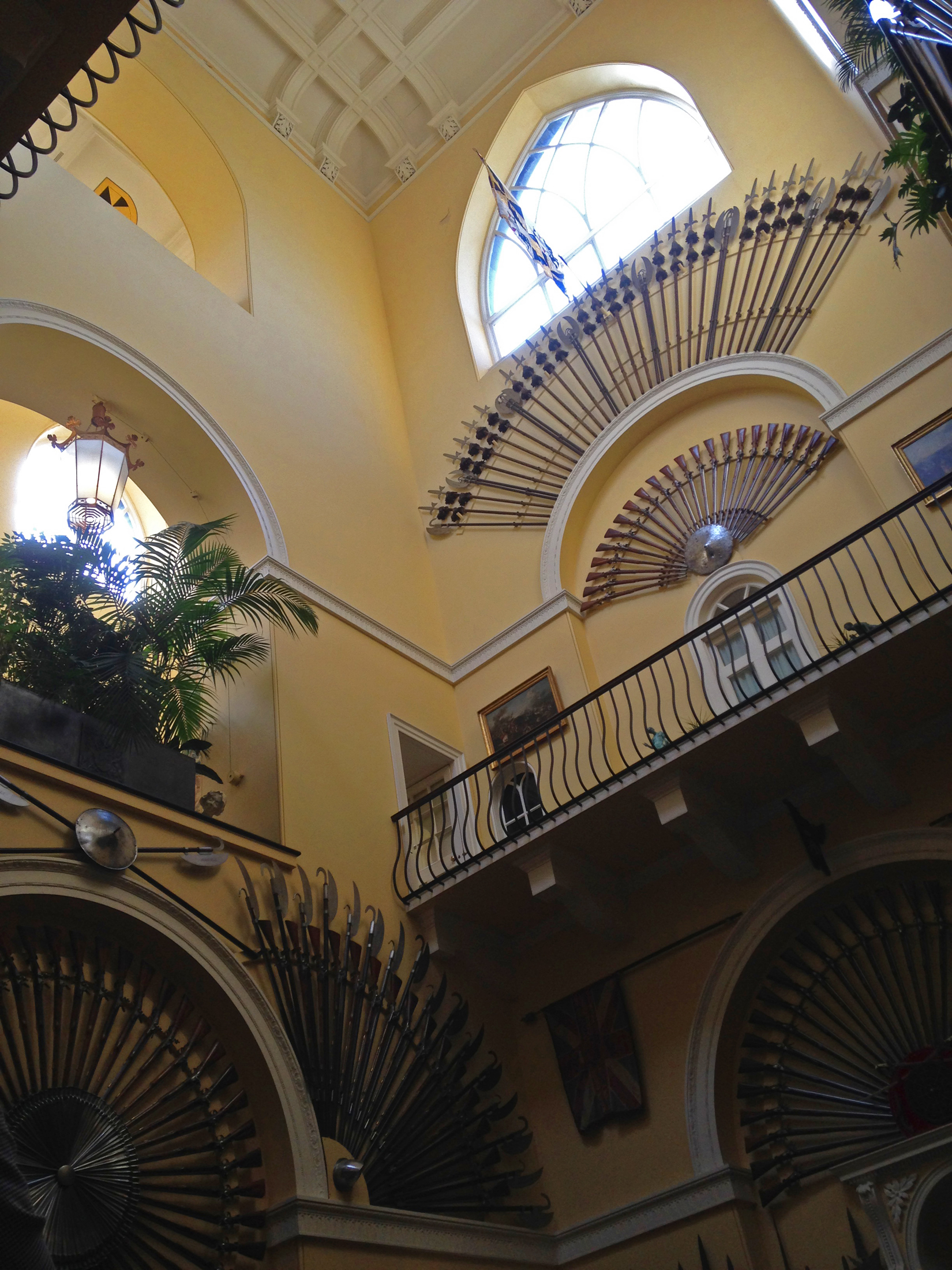
Inveraray interior great hall

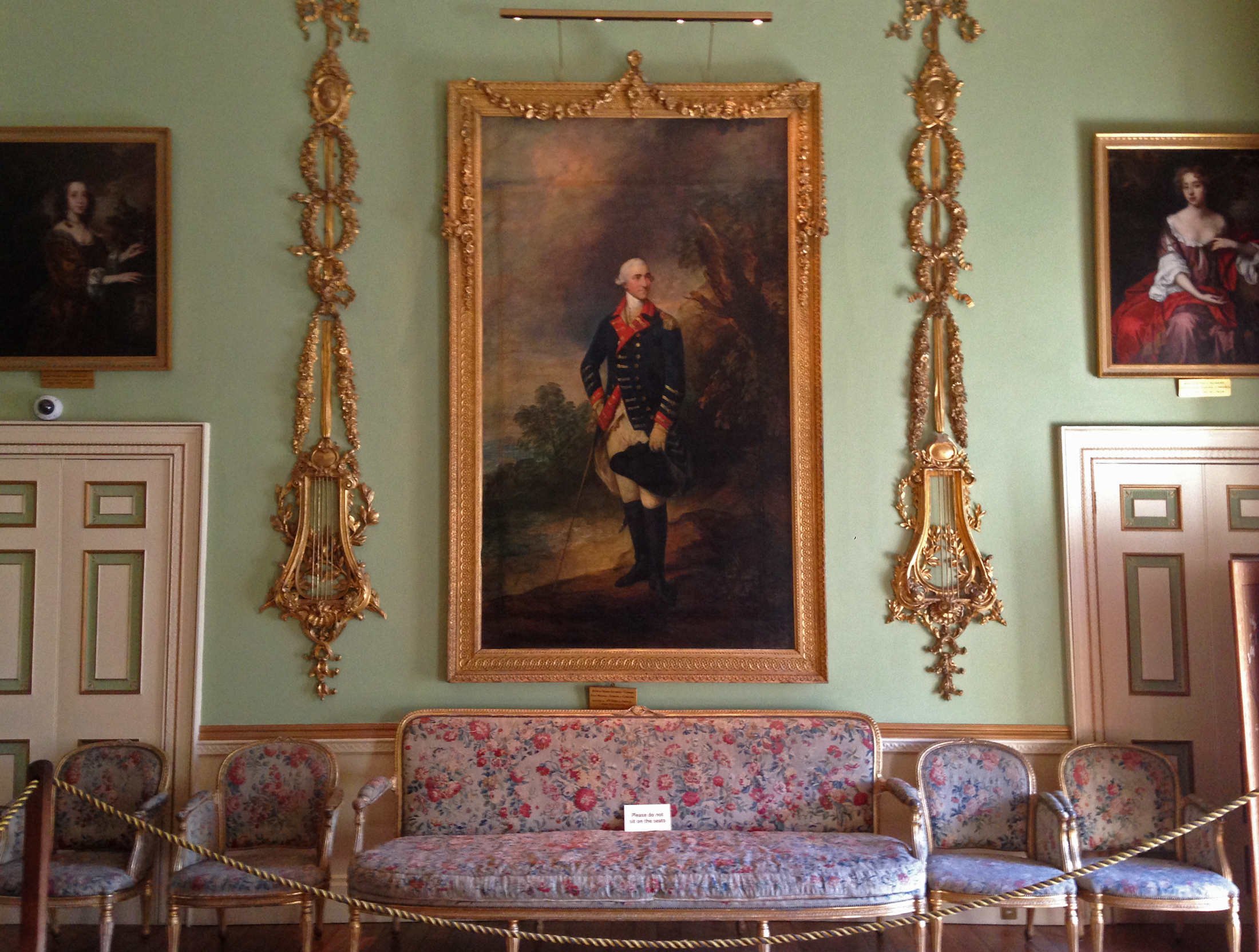
Inveraray interior

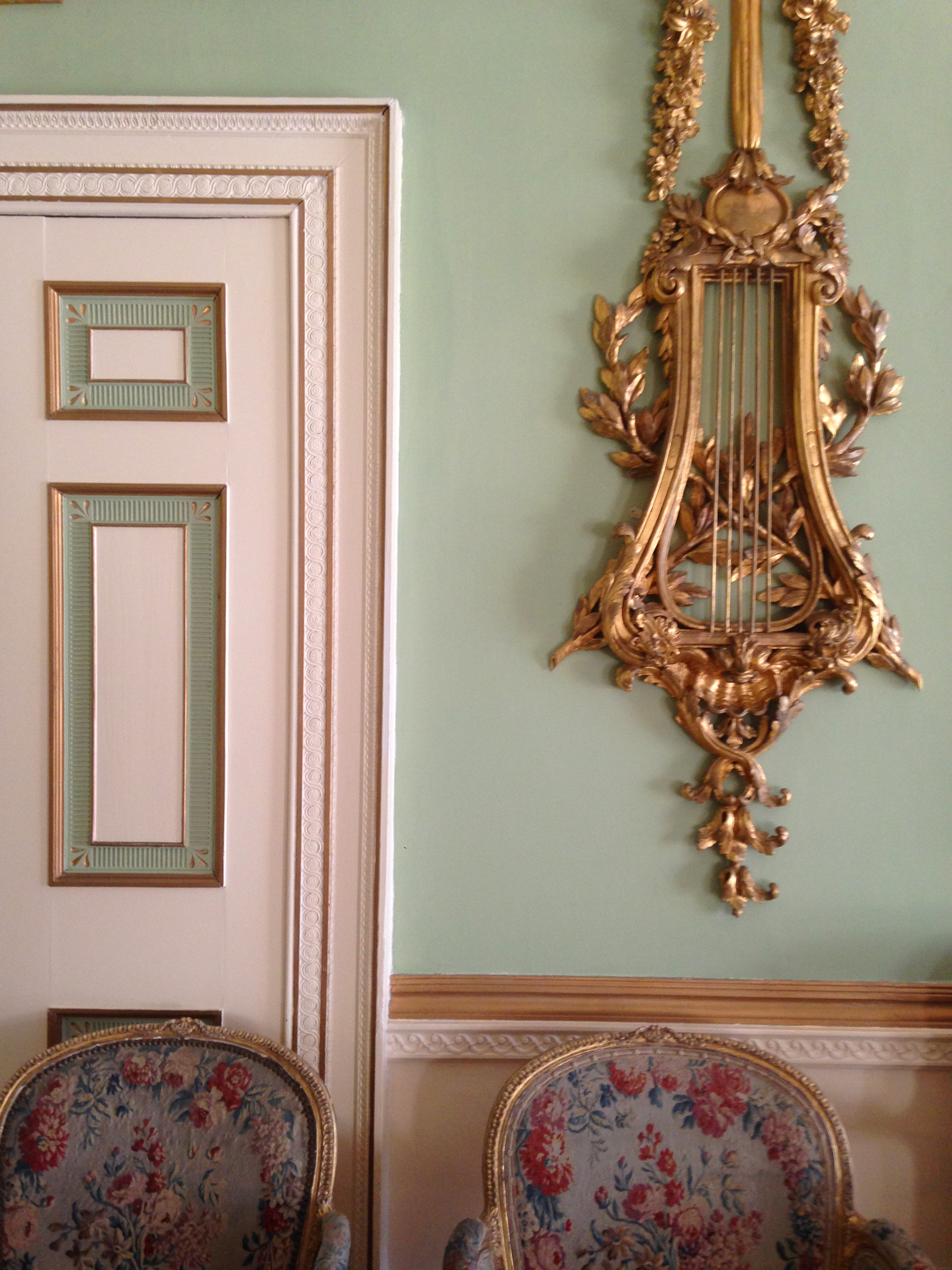
Inveraray interior detail

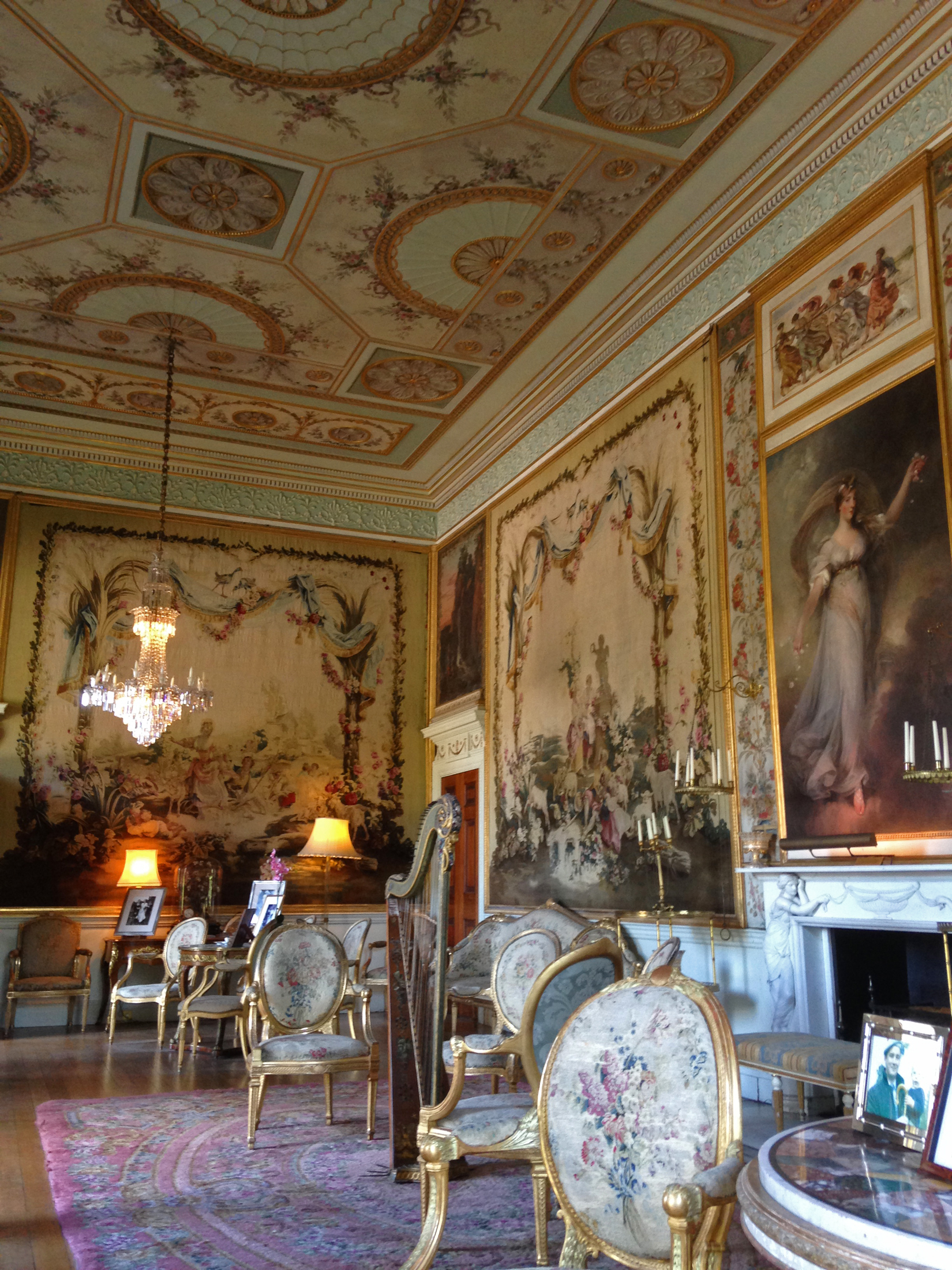
Inveraray interior sitting room

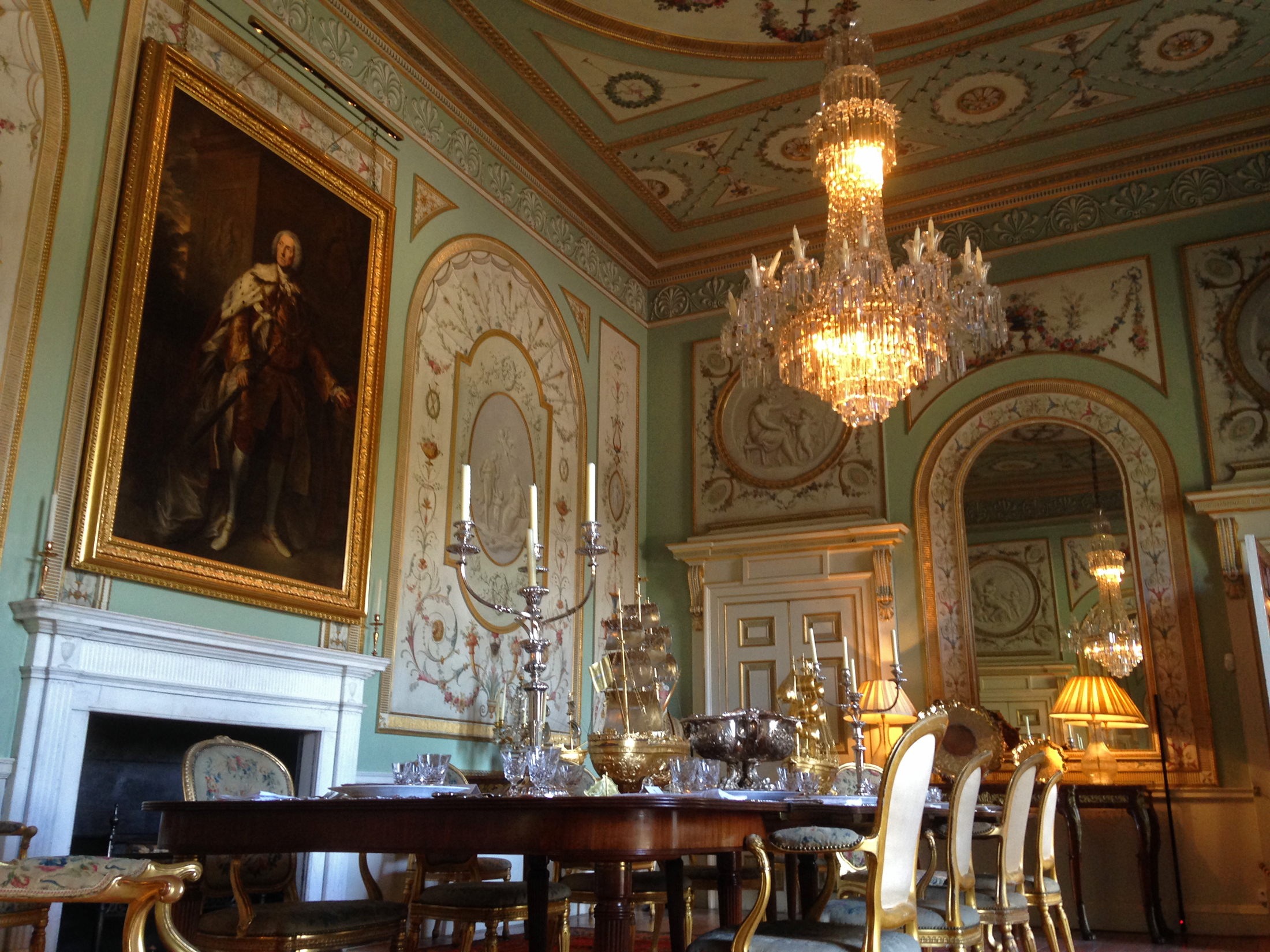
Inveraray interior dining room

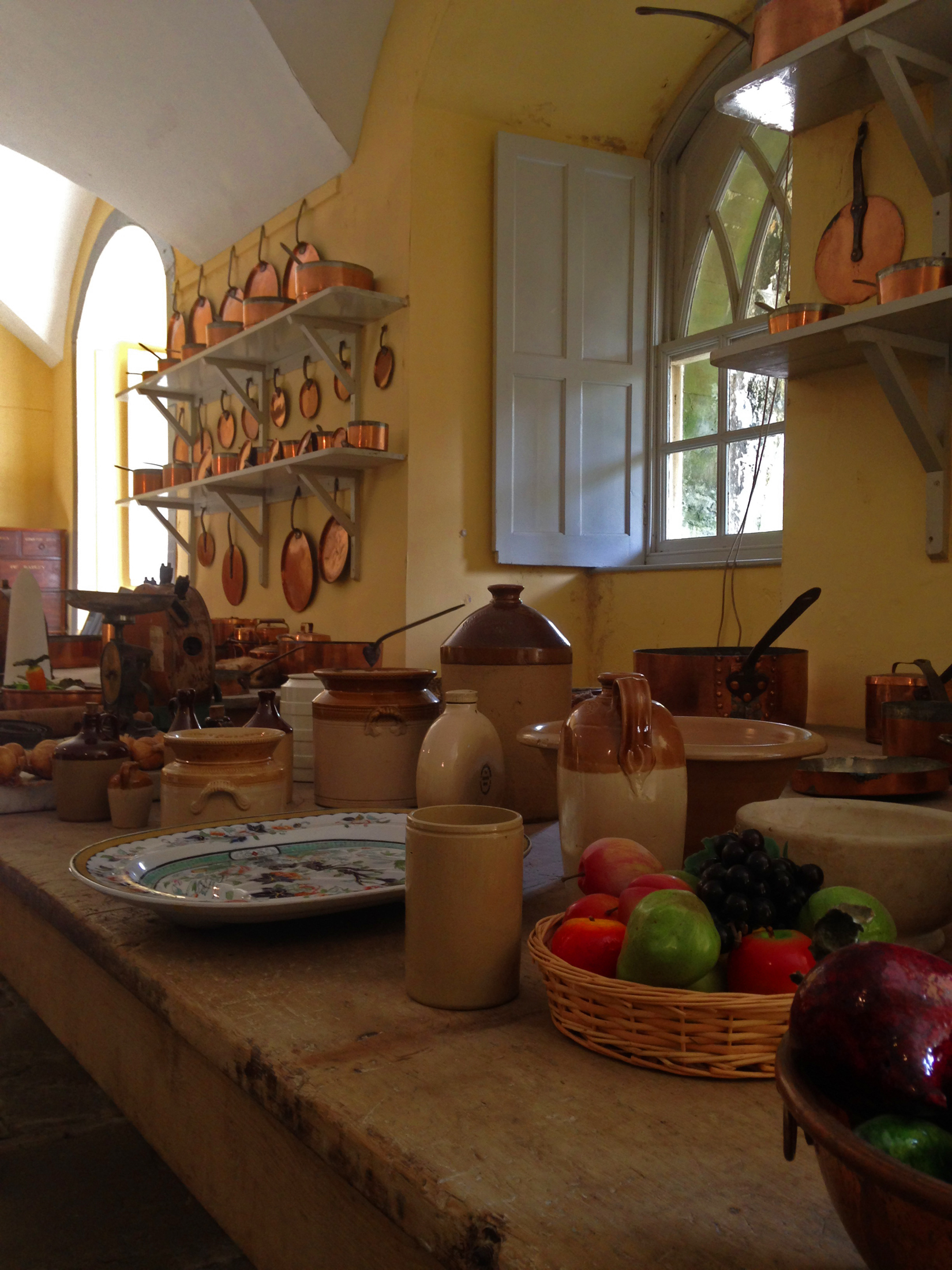
Inveraray interior kitchen
