= Anne Karin Torheim =

Norwegian poet and novelist (born 1953)

Anne Karin Torheim (born 12 May 1953) is a Norwegian poet and novelist.

She was born in Bergen, but grew up in Eid Municipality. She made her debut with the poetry collection Tida er verken ute eller inne (1990), and followed with Huset på halvvegen (1993) and Ferskentransporten. Memoranda (1996), all on the publishing house Det Norske Samlaget. These have been described as the "Peach Trilogy", and Torheim has been described by Janne Stigen Drangsholt as a poet in the "lyrical tradition of Eldrid Lunden".

Det Nasjonale Boblegalleri (2000) was a collection of short prose, where the realistic was mixed with the surrealistic, irony and sarcasm to paint a portrait of Norwegian society. 2002's Kven er redd for Sonja Henie? was a novel about an artistically inclined woman who idolized Sonja Henie.

As a translator to Norwegian Nynorsk, Torheim has among others been responsible for Alice Sebold's The Lovely Bones and The Almost Moon as well as Margaret Atwood's The Journals of Susanna Moodie and Morning in the Burned House.
