= Katherine Manners =

British actress and writer

- Born: London, England
- Occupations: Actress, writer, celebrant
- Years active: 2008–present

Katherine Manners is an English actress, screenwriter, and playwright. She is best known for her lead role as Vera Brittain in the 2008 BBC One television documentary A Woman in Love and War: Vera Brittain and for portraying Jane Corby Whigham in the 2021 Prime Video historical drama television miniseries A Very British Scandal. She has performed as a stage actress at the Royal National Theatre, Watford Palace Theatre, and West End Theatre. She was part of the international touring cast of Sam Mendes' production of Richard III. A screenwriter and playwright, Manners has written for the London Omnibus programme, and for the National Theatre with Melly Still. In 2017, she wrote and produced the play C*nt at The Yard Theatre.

== Career ==
=== Theatre ===
Manners is a playwright and dramatist with the London Omnibus programme, which produces short plays by London-based writers. She works regularly in the West End and Royal National Theatre. She was part of the ensemble that toured internationally performing Sam Mendes' Bridge Project production of Richard III. Manners also developed a script at the National Theatre with the director Melly Still.

In 2005 and 2006, Manners played Edward Ashbrook in the First London Cast of Helen Edmundson's play Coram Boy at the National Theatre. In 2006 and 2007, she portrayed the young Aaron and Alexander Ashbrook in Coram Boy as part of the Second London Cast. In 2009, she performed in Charlotte Keatley's three-act play My Mother Said I Never Should at Watford Palace Theatre. In 2013, she played the role of Salvation Army girl in the play From Morning to Midnight at the National Theatre.

In 2017, Manners wrote a play titled C*nt about women, women's anatomy, and women's sexuality, that was produced and performed at The Yard Theatre.

=== Film and television ===
Manners is represented by AHA Talent in London.

In April 2006, Manners guest starred on the British medical drama series Casualty's episode "Blind Spots". In 2008, she portrayed Vera Brittain in the BBC One television documentary A Woman in Love and War: Vera Brittain. In 2014, she appeared in Kevin Spacey's VHX documentary NOW: In the Wings on a World Stage about William Shakespeare's play Richard III. In 2016, Manners appeared in an episode of the British crime drama television series Stan Lee's Lucky Man, and in 2019, she appeared in an episode of the British medical drama series Holby City. In 2021, Manners portrayed Jane Corby Whigham in the BBC One/Prime Video historical drama miniseries A Very British Scandal.

Manners is working as a writer for a sitcom with What Larks! Productions and Boxfly Media.

=== Celebrant and officiant ===
Manners is trained as a funeral celebrant and marriage officiant through the United Kingdom Society of Celebrants. She works as a celebrant in London and East Hertfordshire officiating weddings, funerals, memorials, and naming ceremonies. She specializes in serving members of the LGBT community.

== Personal life ==
Manners was born and raised in London. She resided in Hackney before buying a narrowboat and living on the canal and river network.

She identifies as queer.

== Filmography ==
- Casualty (series 20) (2006)
- A Woman in Love and War: Vera Brittain (2008) as Vera Brittain
- NOW: In the Wings on a World Stage (2014)
- Stan Lee's Lucky Man (2016)
- Holby City (2019)
- A Very British Scandal (2021) as Jane Corby Whigham
