= Jane Beadon =

Scottish socialite (1913–1999)

- Born: Vera Jane Siddons Corby; 4 December 1913; Aberdeen, Scotland
- Died: 30 June 1999 (aged 85); Maidenhead, Berkshire, England
- Occupations: Socialite, actress
- Spouses: Edgar Jarvis (m. 1934; div. 1939) George Hay Whigham (m. 1956; died 1960) Clive Beadon (m. 1965; died 1996)
- Children: Shirley Jarvis Hamilton
- Relatives: Margaret Campbell, Duchess of Argyll (stepdaughter)

Vera Jane Siddons Beadon, formerly Jarvis and Whigham, (née Corby; 4 December 1913 – 30 June 1999) was a Scottish socialite, heiress, and actress. She was known as the leading witness in the internationally publicized 1963 divorce case between her stepdaughter and stepson-in-law, Margaret Campbell, Duchess of Argyll and Ian Campbell, 11th Duke of Argyll. Beadon, who was accused of having an affair with the Duke of Argyll by her stepdaughter, successfully sued the duchess for libel, slander, and conspiracy to suborn perjury. Beadon testified in court on behalf of the duke, presenting evidence supporting the duke's claim that the duchess had engaged in extramarital affairs. At the time of her death in 1999, she was the last surviving participant in the Argyll divorce case.

== Biography ==
Beadon was born Vera Jane Siddons Corby in Aberdeen on 4 December 1913, the daughter of John Siddons Corby, who invented the Corby gentleman's trouser press. Her brother, Peter Corby, was a veteran of the Royal Air Force and the inventor of the modern trouser press. She was a descendant of the Welsh actress Sarah Siddons and a relative of the Kemble family.

In 1934 she married Edgar Jarvis, a master tailor, but the marriage ended in 1939. She had one daughter, Shirley Jarvis Hamilton, from this marriage. During World War II, she shared a flat in West End of London with the actress Phyllis Stanley. During this time, Beadon appeared in several films. She later moved to the United States to market her father's trouser press and, while there, had an affair with a married American Army colonel.

In 1948, while seated at the captain's table aboard the RMS Queen Elizabeth, she was introduced to Scottish millionaire George Hay Whigham, the founder and chairman of the British Celanese Fibre Corporation. Whigham, the father of Margaret Campbell, Duchess of Argyll, was still married to his first wife, Helen Mann Hannay, when the two began an affair. Whigham was thirty-four years her senior, and his daughter was older than Beadon. On 31 October 1956, twenty months after the death of Whigham's wife, they married at Caxton Hall in London. In December 1959 the Whigham's marriage reached a crisis point, when she was called to give evidence in proceedings to commit her stepdaughter to prison for breaching a High Court of Justiciary undertaking not to "impugn the legitimacy" of the duke's sons, Ian Campbell, Marquess of Lorne and Lord Colin Campbell. She appeared in public with a black eye, and claimed that her husband was responsible for the injury. She and Whigham were legally separated in 1960 and, when he died that same year, she was excluded from his will. She contested the will and won a dower right for life to one third of the income from his estate in the Bahamas.

Beadon was one of the leading witnesses in the highly publicized divorce case of her stepdaughter and Ian Campbell, 11th Duke of Argyll. She presented evidence in court against her stepdaughter on behalf of the duke. The duchess counter-petitioned the divorce, accusing Beadon of committing adultery with the duke. The duchess dropped her case the day of the hearing due to lack of a witness, and later had to pay a judgment of £25,000 to Beadon, who sued her for libel, slander, and conspiracy to suborn perjury. She was the last surviving figure of the divorce case.

In February 1965, she married Wing Commander Clive Beadon, an officer in the Royal Air Force who was awarded the Distinguished Flying Cross for his service as a bomber pilot in World War II. The ceremony took place at Carlton Hall in London. The couple honeymooned at her late husband's mansion in Cable Beach, Nassau. Commander Beadon died in 1996.

On 30 June 1999, Beadon was found dead by a maid at her home in Maidenhead, Berkshire. She had been in poor health due to multiple sclerosis.

== In popular culture ==
Beadon was portrayed by Katherine Manners in the 2021 historical drama series A Very British Scandal.
