= The Almost Moon =

2007 novel by Alice Sebold

- Author: Alice Sebold
- Language: English
- Genre: Fiction
- Publisher: Little, Brown and Company
- Publication date: 2007
- Publication place: USA
- Media type: Print (hardback)
- Pages: 291
- ISBN: 0-316-67746-9
- OCLC: 85830839
- Dewey Decimal: 813/.6 22
- LC Class: PS3619.E26 A79 2007

The Almost Moon is the third book and the second novel by the American author Alice Sebold, author of the memoir, Lucky and the best-selling novel The Lovely Bones. The Almost Moon was released by Little, Brown and Company in the United States on October 16, 2007.

== Synopsis ==
The professional art-class model, mother, and divorcee, Helen Knightly spontaneously murders her mother, an agoraphobic who is suffering from severe dementia, by suffocating her with a towel. But while Helen's act is almost unconscious, it also seems like the fulfilment of a long-cherished, buried desire, since she spent a lifetime trying to win the love of a mother who had none to spare. Over the next twenty-four hours, Helen recalls her: childhood, youth, marriage, and motherhood. Helen's life and the omnipresent relationship with her mother rush in at her as she confronts the choices that have brought her to that crossroads. Partly absent-mindedly, partly desperately she tries to conceal her crime, and in doing so ropes her ex-husband into the conspiracy.

== Reception ==
The novel received mixed reviews from literary critics. While some lauded the story for its unflinching portrayal of violence and mental illness in America, others found it messy or unconvincing. Eileen Battersby of The Irish Times described the novel as "comparable to Jeffrey Eugenides's The Virgin Suicides (1993), is a candid, at times horribly funny and often beautifully touching exploration of one woman's realisation that her life has been swallowed, or rather cancelled. The genius which guides The Almost Moon is its absolute, horrible, multiple truth; its staggering clarity." Helen Dunmore of The Times notes that, "Chapter by chapter, Sebold peels away the layers of her narrator's misery and self-deception, and creates an extended and sometimes blackly comic critique of a popular literary genre." While Kim Hedges of the San Francisco Chronicle concludes that the novel is "simultaneously uncomfortable and absorbing". Similarly, Lee Siegel of The New York Times described the book as "so morally, emotionally and intellectually incoherent that it's bound to become a best seller." In Literary Review, Carole Angier wrote: “Instead of awakening you to tragedy as The Lovely Bones does, as all good writing does, The Almost Moon makes you want to keep your eyes firmly closed.” Michael Antman of PopMatters asserted that The Almost Moon is "vastly more resonant and real than the fairy tale that made her name".

However, Anna Shapiro of The Guardian called The Almost Moon "unrealistic, but it's leavened with realistic description". Writing for Village Voice, Michael Antman was similarly critical of the book's subject matter, noting that, "the book is emotionally false... it is implausible that people would react to the murder as they do." Sam Anderson of the New York Magazine criticized the novel for its similarity to Sebold's second book, The Lovely Bones, noting that, "it’s tempting to think that Sebold is self-plagiarizing strategically here, Faulkner style, in order to knit the books meaningfully together—but unfortunately there’s no real evidence of this. I wonder, instead, if her imaginative territory is just so small that we’ve already had the full tour."
