= Coram Boy (play) =

Play written by Helen Edmundson

Coram Boy is a play written by Helen Edmundson with music composed by Adrian Sutton, based on the 2000 children's novel of the same name by Jamila Gavin, an epic adventure that concerns the theme of child cruelty. The play is called a "play with music", rather than a musical.

== Synopsis ==
The action takes place in the eighteenth century. The benevolent Thomas Coram has recently opened a Foundling Hospital in London called the "Coram Hospital for Deserted Children". Unscrupulous men, known as "Coram men", take advantage of the situation by promising desperate mothers to take their unwanted children to the hospital for a fee. The story follows a range of characters, focusing on two orphans: Toby, saved from an African slave ship; and Aaron, the deserted son of the heir to an estate, as their lives become closely involved with this true and tragic episode of British social history.

== Productions ==
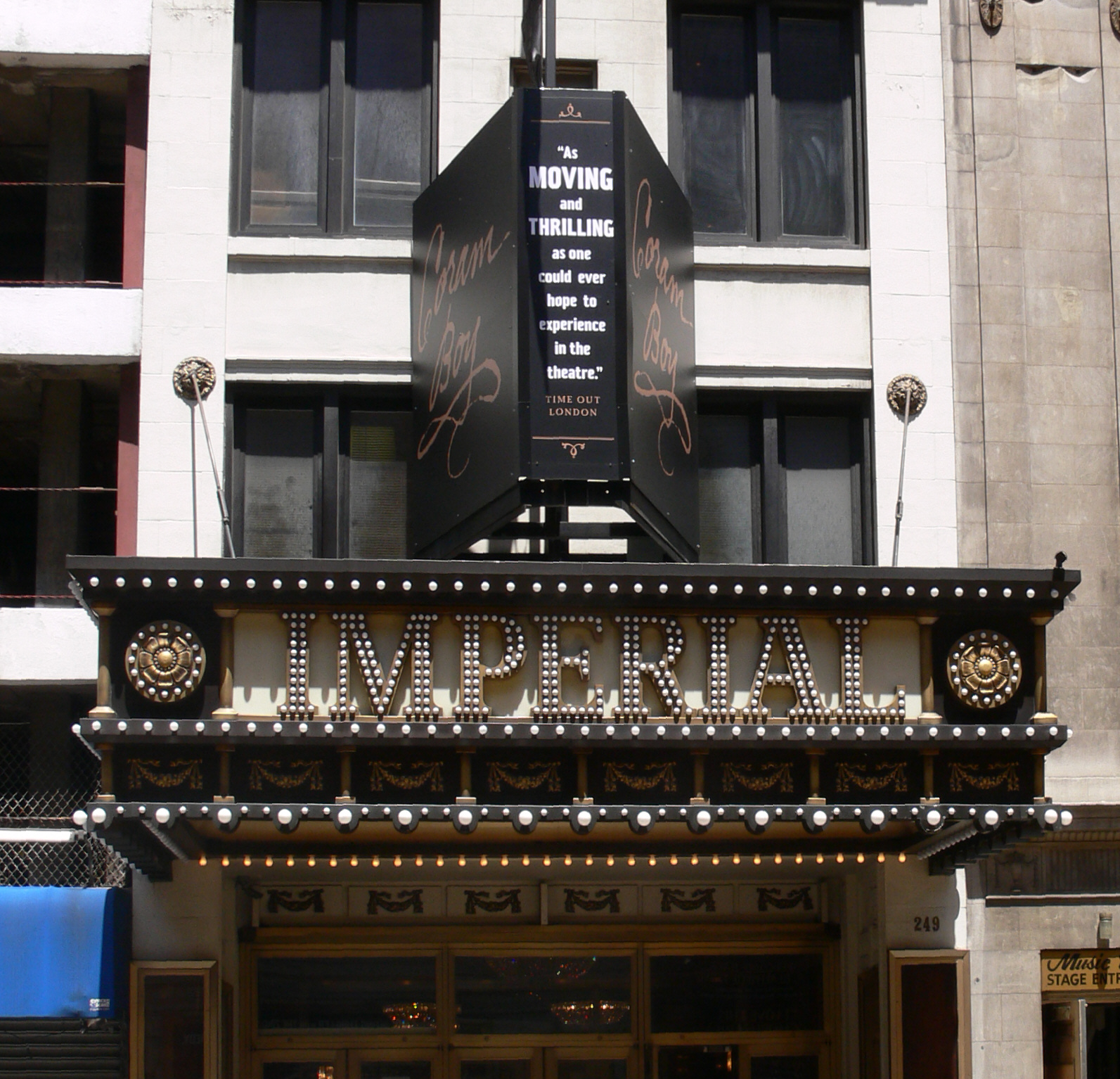
Coram Boy at the Imperial Theatre, New York

The show was first staged at the National Theatre in London from November 2005 until February 2006. It returned to the National Theatre from November 2006 to February 2007.

The play then moved to Broadway at the Imperial Theater, starting previews in April 2007, and officially opening for a month-long run in May 2007. The show was nominated for six Tony Awards but did not win any.

Melly Still was the director and co-designer (with Ti Green) of both the London and New York productions with Paule Constable designing lighting and Chris Schutt on sound. Still also directed the December 2011 production for Bristol Old Vic at the Colston Hall and the production was designed by Anna Fleischle, with lighting by Bruno Poet, and sound by Schutt. Adrian Sutton composed the music for all four versions.

Coram Boy is frequently produced in Britain by Universities, Drama schools and amateur groups.

First London Cast (2005 - 2006)

- Toby - Akiya Henry
- Aaron / Alexander Ashbrook (young) - Anna Madeley
- Alexander Ashbrook (adult) - Bertie Carvel
- Mrs. Lynch - Ruth Gemmell
- Molly - Chetna Pandya
- Mrs. Hendry - Sharon Maharaj
- Otis Gardiner - Paul Ritter
- Thomas Ledbury (adult) - Stuart McLoughlin
- Thomas Claymore - Adam Shipway
- Meshak - Jack Tarlton
- Isobel Ashbrook - Kelly Williams
- Edward Ashbrook - Katherine Manners
- Miss Price - Inika Leigh Wright
- Lord Ashbrook - William Scott Massive
- George Frideric Handel - Nick Tizzard
- Mrs. Milcote - Eve Matheson
- Alice Ashbrook - Sophie Bould
- Thomas Ledbury (young) - Abby Ford
- Lady Ashbrook - Rebecca Johnson
- Melissa / Angel - Justine Mitchell

Second London Cast (2006 - 2007)

- Toby - Debbie Korley
- Aaron / Alexander Ashbrook (young) - Katherine Manners
- Alexander Ashbrook (adult) - Bertie Carvel
- Mrs. Lynch - Ruth Gemmell
- Molly - Deeivya Meir
- Mrs. Hendry - Sharon Maharaj
- Otis Gardiner - Tim McMullan
- Thomas Ledbury (adult) - Stuart McLoughlin
- Thomas Claymore - Adam Shipway
- Meshak - Al Weaver
- Isobel Ashbrook - Kelly Williams
- Edward Ashbrook - Hannah Storey
- Miss Price - Inika Leigh Wright
- Lord Ashbrook - William Scott Massive
- George Frideric Handel - Nick Tizzard
- Mrs. Milcote - Clare Burt
- Alice Ashbrook - Jenni Maitland
- Thomas Ledbury (young) - Abby Ford
- Lady Ashbrook - Rebecca Johnson
- Melissa / Angel - Justine Mitchell

Broadway Cast

- Toby - Uzo Aduba
- Aaron / Alexander Ashbrook (young) - Xanthe Elbrick
- Alexander Ashbrook (adult) - Wayne Wilcox
- Mrs. Lynch - Jan Maxwell
- Molly - Jolly Abraham
- Mrs. Hendry — Jacqueline Antaramian
- Otis Gardiner — Bill Camp
- Thomas Ledbury (adult) - Dashiell Eaves
- Thomas Claymore — Tom Riis Farrell
- Meshak — Brad Fleischer
- Isobel Ashbrook - Karron Graves
- Edward Ashbrook — Laura Heisler
- Miss Price — Angela Lin
- Lord Ashbrook — David Andrew Macdonald
- George Frideric Handel — Quentin Maré
- Mrs. Milcote — Kathleen McNenny
- Alice Ashbrook - Cristin Milioti
- Thomas Ledbury (young) - Charlotte Parry
- Lady Ashbrook — Christina Rouner
- Melissa / Angel — Ivy Vahanian

Bristol - Colston Hall (Bristol Old Vic 2011)

- Otis Gardiner — Tristan Sturrock
- Meshak Gardiner — Fionn Gill
- Alexander Ashbrook (young) - George Clark
- Alexander Ashbrook (adult) - Freddie Hutchins
- Melissa / Angel - Emily Head / Mabel Moll
- Mrs. Lynch — Lucy Black
- Lord Ashbrook - Simon Shepherd
- Lady Ashbrook — Saskia Portway
- Isobel Ashbrook — Grace Carter / Florence Woolley
- Alice Ashbrook — Esther Lawrence / Bethan Barke / Peggy Edwards
- Edward Ashbrook — Tobey Barke / Cameron Fraser
- Mrs. Hendry/Mrs. Milcote — Catherine Swingler
- Thomas Claymore / George Frideric Handel — Joe Hall
- Thomas Ledbury (young) - Johannes Moore / Max Macmillan
- Dr Smith/Thomas Ledbury — Ed Birch
- Aaron — Toby Yapp / Finn Lacey
- Toby — Joe Sharpe
- Miss Price — Anna Houghton

The production also included a local cast of Coram children and a local ensemble.

== Music ==
In the National Theatre and Broadway versions the music is performed by a 16-member onstage choir and a seven-piece chamber orchestra. In Bristol the orchestra was expanded to 20 musicians and the choir was joined at the end of act 2 by a local chorus of 40 performers. The music includes parts or adaptations of Handel's Messiah and Theodora, as well as over an hour of original music consisting of songs, period-style dance, and chamber music, as well as dramatic underscoring.

When the play was performed at Chichester Festival Theatre in the Summer of 2024, the Chichester Cathedral Choir recorded 15 minutes of music to be used within the production.

== Awards and nominations ==
Tony Award nominations (no wins):

- Best Featured Actress in a Play
  - Xanthe Elbrick
  - Jan Maxwell
- Best Direction of a Play
- Best Scenic Design of a Play
- Best Costume Design of a Play
- Best Lighting Design of a Play

2007 Theatre World Award - Xanthe Elbrick (winner)

Drama Desk Award nominations for Outstanding Featured Actress in a Play:

- Xanthe Elbrick
- Jan Maxwell

Outer Critics Circle Award nominations (no wins):

- Outstanding New Broadway Play
- Outstanding Director of a Play (Lucille Lortel Award)
- Outstanding Set Design (Ti Green & Melly Still)
- Outstanding Lighting Design (Paule Constable)

Olivier Award Nominations (no wins) Best new play (Helen Edmundson) Best performance in a supporting role (Paul Ritter) Best Director (Melly Still) Best Sound (Christopher Shutt)
