= Clive Beadon =

British officer of the Royal Air Force

Wing Commander Clive Beadon DFC

Personal details
- Born: 15 April 1919 Coonoor, India, British Empire
- Died: 14 September 1996 (aged 77) Windsor, Berkshire, England
- Spouse: Jane Corby Whigham (m. 1965)
- Education: Imperial Service College; Royal Air Force College Cranwell
- Occupation: Military officer, dowser
- Awards: Distinguished Flying Cross; War Medal 1939-1945; 1939-1945 Star; Atlantic Star; Defense Medal; Queen Elizabeth II Coronation Medal; Air Force Cross of Aeronautical Merit

Military service
- Allegiance: United Kingdom
- Branch/service: United Kingdom Royal Air Force
- Years of service: 1939–1966
- Rank: Wing Commander
- Commands: No. 502 Squadron RAF; No. 297 Squadron RAF
- Battles/wars: Mediterranean and Middle East theatre of World War II; Burma campaign

Wing Commander Clive Vernon Beadon DFC (15 April 1919 – 14 September 1996) was a British dowser, diplomat, and officer in the Royal Air Force.

== Biography ==
Clive Vernon Beadon was born on 15 April 1919 in Coonoor, British India, the son of a British soldier.

Beadon graduated from the Imperial Service College and was offered a scholarship to the Royal Military Academy Sandhurst. Against his father's wishes, he declined acceptance to Sandhurst, instead choosing to train as a pilot at the Royal Air Force College Cranwell. He was commissioned into the Royal Air Force a few months before the outbreak of World War II in 1939, serving first in the No. 502 Squadron RAF. At the end of 1940 he was transferred to be an instructor at the Central Flying School. In August 1942 he was sent to the Middle East. Later that year he was transferred to Southeast Asia, where he flew Consolidated B-24 Liberator and Vickers Wellington bombers in hundreds of missions against the Japanese.

In 1944, Beadon flew a Liberator at low level to bomb Japanese supply trains on the Bangkok–Chiang Mai railway in Thailand. After his aircraft was hit by Japanese anti-aircraft guns that killed his gunner, he flew the burning aircraft over one thousand miles back to a British airbase in India, saving the lives of his remaining crewmen, whose parachutes had been destroyed by the fire. Beadon was awarded the Distinguished Flying Cross for merit by King George VI in 1945, in addition to campaign medals the Atlantic Star, the Defence Medal (United Kingdom), the War Medal, and the Burma Star.

After the war ended, Beadon held positions at RAF Bomber Command and the Air Ministry. In 1950, he was appointed as a commanding officer of No. 297 Squadron RAF. He was awarded the Queen Elizabeth II Coronation Medal by Elizabeth II during the 1953 Coronation Honours.

In 1953 the British government sent Beadon on a mission to Entebbe to abduct Mutesa II of Buganda. The British claimed they feared that the Bugandan king was in danger of being killed by his political opponents. In reality, Ugandan Colonial Governor Sir Andrew Cohen deposed the king and ordered his exile to London since Mutesa II demanded that Buganda be separated from the rest of the Protectorate of Uganda and be transferred to the jurisdiction of the Foreign Office when the Parliament of Buganda sought independence. Beadon kept the engines of his aircraft running while his air force colleagues covered the king's head with a blanket and dragged him on board while he protested. When they landed in the United Kingdom, Beadon apologized to Mutesa II for his methods of rescue and bowed before him.

From 1954 to 1957 he served as an air attaché in Caracas, and in the 1960s he served as an air attaché in Paris. He was awarded the Air Force Cross of Aeronautical Merit by President Gustavo Rojas Pinilla of Colombia for his service in the 1950s.

In February 1965 Beadon married Scottish heiress and socialite Jane Corby Whigham, the widowed stepmother of Margaret Campbell, Duchess of Argyll, at Carlton Hall in London. They honeymooned at the mansion of her late husband, George Hay Whigham, in Cable Beach, Bahamas. He was Whigham's third husband and she was his second wife (his first wife had died of cancer in 1964). Beadon and his wife lived in Aboyne, then moved to Maidenhead in 1994.

He retired from the Royal Air Force in 1966.

A renowned dowser, Beadon established a research program in 1979 to use "powerful magnetic energy" of natural gemstones to "rebalance all disruptions caused by geopathic stress". The program resulted in the creation of the pseudoscientific Spiral of Tranquility product range. He was a member of the British Society of Dowsers. Beadon, along with Geoffrey King, created a device called the Beadon cube, which was meant to remove harmful "Earth energies".

Beadon, who suffered from Raynaud syndrome and a stroke, died after a long illness on 14 September 1996 at a hospital in Windsor, Berkshire.
