= The Lovely Bones (play) =

British play

- Original language: English
- Written by: Alice Sebold (novel); Bryony Lavery (play)
- Genre: Drama
- Setting: 1973–1985 Pennsylvania and heaven

Premiere
- Date: 1 September 2018
- Place: Royal & Derngate, Northampton

The Lovely Bones is a 2018 British play based on the 2002 novel of the same name by Alice Sebold. It was adapted for the stage by Bryony Lavery.

== Production ==
The production is directed by Melly Still, designed by Ana Inés Jabares-Pita with lighting design by Matt Haskins, sound design by Helen Skiera and movement design by Mike Ashcroft.

The production made its world premiere at the Royal & Derngate in Northampton on 1 September 2018 running until 22 September. It toured to Everyman Liverpool (25 September to 6 October), Northern Stage (9 to 20 October), Birmingham Repertory Theatre (30 October to 10 November) and New Wolsey Theatre (13 to 17 November).

Following its 2018 tour, the production returned to the Birmingham Repertory Theatre from 10 September (previews from 6 September) until 21 September 2019. It embarked on another UK tour to Theatre Royal Nottingham, Exeter Northcott Theatre, Norwich Theatre Royal, The Lowry Salford, Rose Theatre Kingston, Hackney Empire, Cambridge Arts Theatre, Oxford Playhouse, Yvonne Arnaud Theatre, Guildford and Chichester Festival Theatre.

== Cast and characters ==
Character	2018 UK tour cast	2019 UK tour cast
Susie Salmon	Charlotte Beaumont	Charlotte Beaumont
Len Fenerman/Samuel Heckler	Pete Ashmore	Huw Parmenter
Abigail Salmon	Emily Bevan	Catrin Aaron
Ruana Singh/Franny	Bhawna Bhawsar	Avita Jay
Lyn/Cop/Mrs Flanagan	Susan Bovell	Lynda Rooke
Ruth Connors/Buckley Salmon	Natasha Cottriall	Leigh Lothian
Mr Harvey	Keith Dunphy	Nicholas Khan
Ray Singh/Principal Caden/Holiday	Karan Gill	Samuel Gosrani
Jack Salmon	Jack Sandle	Jack Sandle
Lindsey Salmon	Ayoola Smart	Fanta Barrie

== See also ==
- The Lovely Bones, 2009 film
