= Coram Boy =

2000 children's novel by Jamila Gavin

- First edition (publ. Mammoth Books)
- Author: Jamila Gavin
- Publisher: Egmont
- Publication date: January 1, 2000
- Award: Whitbread Prize
- ISBN: 978-1-405-21282-3

Coram Boy is a 2000 children's novel by Jamila Gavin. It won Gavin a Whitbread Children's Book Award.

== Reception ==
Coram Boy received reviews from Booklist, the Journal of Adolescent & Adult Literacy, Kirkus Reviews, Publishers Weekly, and The New York Times Book Review.

In 2000, Coram Boy won the Whitbread Prize for Children's Book.

== Stage adaptation ==
The book was adapted for the stage by Helen Edmundson, with music (after Handel) by Adrian Sutton, and played for two runs on the Olivier Stage at the National Theatre in 2005-2006 and 2006–2007, also having a brief Broadway production in 2007.

The play received a number of Tony Award, Drama Desk Award and Outer Critics Circle Award nominations, and a Theatre World Award for Xanthe Elbrick in 2007. Coram Boy was nominated for four Olivier Awards in 2006: for Best New Play (Helen Edmundson), Best Director (Melly Still), Best Sound Design (Christopher Shutt), and Best Performance in a Supporting Role (Paul Ritter).

Coram Boy was re-staged in 2011 by Bristol Old Vic at Colston Hall, now the Bristol Beacon, again directed by Melly Still, and featuring a cast, choir and orchestra from Bristol.
