= The Magic Orange Tree and Other Stories =

Collection of short stories by Jamila Gavin

The Magic Orange Tree and Other Stories is a collection of nine short stories by Jamila Gavin. Each story of this collection is a product of the child's imagination, according to Gavin in the introduction. The events in the story did not take place anywhere, but are some fantasies in the main character's mind. The nine stories in this collection are:

- Pearly's Adventure with the Giant Bird
- Robbie and the Fearsome Beastie
- Aziz and the Amazing Motorbike Ride
- How Grandma Saved the Day
- John and the Green Dragon
- Midnight Cows
- The Miraculous Orange Tree
- Anna in the Land of Clocks
- Danny and the Cats
