= Lucky (memoir) =

1999 memoir by Alice Sebold

- 2002 paperback cover of Lucky
- Author: Alice Sebold
- Language: English
- Genre: Memoir
- Publisher: Scribner
- Publication date: August 4, 1999
- Publication place: United States
- Media type: Print (Hardcover and Paperback)
- Pages: 272 pp
- ISBN: 0-684-85782-0
- OCLC: 40777019
- Dewey Decimal: 364.15/32/092 B 22
- LC Class: HV6561 .S44 1999

Lucky is a 1999 memoir by the American novelist Alice Sebold, best known as the author of the 2002 novel The Lovely Bones. Lucky describes her experience of being raped and beaten when she was eighteen in a tunnel near Syracuse University where she was a student, and how this traumatic experience shaped the rest of her life. Sebold has stated that her reason for writing the book was to bring more awareness to rape and rape survivors. The memoir sold over one million copies.

Anthony Broadwater served 16 years in prison after being falsely accused as the rapist, and was released in 1999. He was exonerated in 2021 after a judge found serious issues with the initial conviction.

== Rape and trial ==
In the early hours of May 8, 1981, while Sebold was eighteen years old and a freshman at Syracuse University, she was assaulted and raped while walking home through a tunnel to an amphitheater near campus. Her attacker told her that he had a knife and that if she screamed or made any noises, he would kill her. She reported the crime to campus security and the police, who took her statement and investigated, but could not identify any suspects.

Shortly after the assault, Sebold returned home to Pennsylvania to live with her family for the summer before beginning her sophomore year at Syracuse University. After five months of no leads by the police, Sebold was walking down a sidewalk near the Syracuse campus when she saw a black man whom she believed to be the person who raped her. In Lucky, she wrote that the man had approached her, saying "Hey, girl. Don't I know you from somewhere?", and that she had recognized his face from the attack. She notified police, who were initially unable to find the man she had encountered. After an officer suggested the man might have been Anthony Broadwater, who had reportedly been seen in the area, police arrested and charged Broadwater.

Broadwater was convicted of rape and sodomy, and sentenced to eight to 25 years in prison. He served 16 years in prison, maintaining his innocence throughout. Because he would not admit to the attack, he was denied parole five times. Broadwater tried five times to have the conviction overturned, with at least as many groups of lawyers. Broadwater was released in 1999 and remained on New York's sex offender registry.

== Writing ==
Sebold began writing Lucky after taking a memoir class with Geoffrey Wolff at the University of California, Irvine, where she completed her MFA in 1998. She published the book in 1999, about a year after Broadwater's release. The title stemmed from a conversation with a police officer who told her that another woman had been raped and murdered in the same location, and that Sebold was "lucky" because she hadn't been killed. In Lucky, Sebold used the name "Gregory Madison" for her rapist. Sebold wrote that the trauma of the rape had made her feel isolated from her family, and that for years afterwards she experienced hypervigilance. She resigned from a job which required her to work at night, fearing danger in darkness. She became depressed, suffered from nightmares, and began drinking and using heroin. Eventually, after reading Judith Lewis Herman's Trauma and Recovery, she realized she had developed post-traumatic stress disorder.

== Film adaptation and exoneration ==
In 2019, a film adaption was announced to be directed by Karen Moncrieff. Victoria Pedretti was cast as Sebold. When Timothy Mucciante began working as executive producer, he noticed discrepancies in the portion of Lucky that described the trial. He told The New York Times: "I started having some doubts—not about the story that Alice told about her assault, which was tragic, but the second part of her book about the trial, which didn't hang together." He left the project because of his concerns and hired a private investigator to review the evidence against Broadwater.

In November 2021, Broadwater was exonerated by a New York Supreme Court justice, who determined there had been serious problems with the conviction. The conviction had relied heavily on Sebold's testimony, as well as on microscopic hair analysis, a forensic technique the United States Department of Justice later found to be unreliable. At the police lineup, which included Broadwater, Sebold had identified a different person as her rapist. When police told her she had picked the wrong person, she said the two men looked "almost identical". Onondaga County District Attorney William J. Fitzpatrick, who joined the motion to overturn the conviction, argued that suspect identification when the suspect is a different race from the victim is prone to error; Sebold is white and Broadwater is black. The prosecutor had also lied to Sebold that Broadwater and the man she identified were friends and that they had both come to the lineup to confuse her; attorneys argued that this had influenced Sebold's testimony. Sebold also wrote in Lucky that the prosecutor had coached her into changing her identification.

Sebold apologized to Broadwater after his exoneration. In her statement, she said: “I am grateful that Mr. Broadwater has finally been vindicated, but the fact remains that 40 years ago, he became another young Black man brutalized by our flawed legal system. I will forever be sorry for what was done to him ... I will continue to struggle with the role that I unwittingly played within a system that sent an innocent man to jail. I will also grapple with the fact that my rapist will, in all likelihood, never be known, may have gone on to rape other women, and certainly will never serve the time in prison that Mr. Broadwater did."

The film adaptation of Lucky was canceled after losing its funding in mid-2021. Scribner, the publisher of Lucky, released a statement following Broadwater's exoneration that distribution of all formats of the book would cease while Sebold and the publisher determined how to revise the work.
