= Melly Still =

British director, designer and choreographer

- Born: 22 August 1962 (age 64); Cambridge, England
- Occupations: Theatre director and designer
- Children: 3

Melly Still (born 22 August 1962) is a British stage director, designer and choreographer.

Still's first professional theatre job was assistant to the choreographer of James and the Giant Peach at Ray DaSilva's Norwich Puppet Theatre in 1985. She has worked as designer and co-director on many productions including the RSC's version of Tales from Ovid and Haroun and the Sea of Stories by Salman Rushdie at the National Theatre.

Since the early 2000s, she principally directs and has worked regularly with the RSC, Bristol Old Vic, Rose Theatre, Birmingham Rep, Wales Millennium Centre, Glyndebourne Festival Opera and on several occasions for the National Theatre including with her multi-award nominated production of Coram Boy in London and on Broadway, The Revenger's Tragedy, From Morning to Midnight, and My Brilliant Friend – Parts 1 & 2 which transferred from Rose Theatre.

She is an Associate Artist at Bristol Old Vic and Rose Theatre, and a fellow at York St John University.

She often works closely with the designer Anna Fleischle and designer Ti Green and also the British director Tim Supple.

== Directing credits ==
- The Seven Pomegranate Seeds – by Colin Teevan (Rose Theatre, 2021).
- The Mirror Crack'd – by Agatha Christie, adapted by Rachel Wagstaff and re-imagined for India by Ayeehsa Menon (NCPA Mumbai, India, 2020) with Sonali Kulkarni, Denzil Smith and Shernaz Patel.
- The Lovely Bones – by Alice Sebold, adapted by Bryony Lavery (UK tour, 2018) with Charlotte Beaumont.
- Captain Corelli's Mandolin – by Louis de Bernières, adapted by Rona Munro (Rose Theatre, UK tour and West End, 2019).
- Tiger Bay the Musical – music by Daf James, book and lyrics by Michael Williams (Wales Millennium Centre, 2017, performed in Cape Town and Cardiff) with John Owen-Jones and Noel Sullivan.
- My Brilliant Friend – Parts 1 & 2 – by Elena Ferrante, adapted by April De Angelis (Rose Theatre, 2017) with Niamh Cusack and Catherine McCormack. The production transferred to London's Royal National Theatre in November 2019.
- Cymbeline – William Shakespeare (Royal Shakespeare Company, 2016)
- Rats' Tales – based on Carol Ann Duffy, devised by Melly Still (Manchester Royal Exchange, 2012)
- The Cunning Little Vixen – Leoš Janáček (Glyndebourne Festival, 2012)
- Coram Boy – by Jamila Gavin, adapted by Helen Edmundson (Bristol Old Vic, 2011)
- Beasts and Beauties – by Carol Ann Duffy (Hampstead Theatre, 2010–2011)
- Zaide – Mozart, in an English Version by Michael Symmons Roberts and Ben Power (Sadlers Wells, 2010)
- Nation – by Terry Pratchett, adapted by Mark Ravenhill (Royal National Theatre, 2009)
- Rusalka – Dvořák (Glyndebourne Festival, 2009 and 2011)
- Cinderella – In a version by Ben Power (Lyric Theatre, Hammersmith)
- The Revenger's Tragedy by Thomas Middleton – (Royal National Theatre, 2008)
- Watership Down – by Richard Adams, adapted by Rona Munro (Lyric Theatre, Hammersmith)
- Coram Boy – by Jamila Gavin, adapted by Helen Edmundson (Royal National Theatre 2005, Imperial Theatre 2007: Broadway)
- Alice in Wonderland – (Bristol Old Vic, 2003)
- Beasts and Beauties – by Carol Ann Duffy (Bristol Old Vic, 2003)

Coram Boy was nominated for four Olivier Awards at London's National Theatre and six Tony Awards on Broadway. Still was nominated for both Best Director and Best Designer at each award ceremony.
