= My Mother Said I Never Should =

1987 play written by Charlotte Keatley

My Mother Said I Never Should is a play in three acts written by Charlotte Keatley and first staged in Manchester in 1987. The play is about the relationships between mothers and daughters and explores the themes of independence, growing up and secrets. It addresses the issues of teenage pregnancy, career prioritization, and single motherhood. It is also about how the different generations break free from their parents' traditions and culture.

The story explores the lives and relationships of four generations of women: Doris (born 1900), Margaret (born 1931), Jackie (born 1952) and Rosie (born 1971). Their loves, expectations, and choices are set against the huge social changes of the twentieth century. When the unmarried Jackie falls pregnant with Rosie, she is unable to cope and hands over the baby to her mother (Margaret), who then brings up Rosie as her own daughter. The play looks at the consequences of this secret and each woman's opinion on it.

The play has a minimalist set and is deliberately unrealistic. The scenes do not follow in chronological order, so in one scene Margaret will be a young child during the war being comforted by her mother Doris and in the next Jackie will be a child visiting her grandma Doris.

== Plot ==
The play has a non-chronological and non-linear structure and moves between different places (Manchester, Oldham, and London) and time periods. It presents various episodes in the lives of the four female characters between the 1920s to 1987. It also features scenes set in "the wasteground", where the four characters play together as their child selves in their own contemporary costumes. The plot can also refer to the struggles these woman face throughout their lives and how they tackle and overcome them.

The play begins in the Wasteground, where the four girls play as contemporaries - Doris appears aged five, Rosie aged eight, and Jackie and Margaret aged nine. They show disgust for the idea of little girls being made of 'sugar and spice and all things nice' and then put forth the idea of 'killing their Mummy'. Jettisoning the younger Doris, they are wary of ingredients for their 'curse' being too real (such as harelip) or too fantastical; and then call upon the spirit of their Granny, fleeing as a figure moves upstage towards them.
The figure is Doris, now an adult and singing to a racy George Formby song on the radio. Her daughter, Margaret, aged eight; surprises her by shouting 'knickers' from beneath the piano. Doris insists on being called 'Mother' rather than 'Mummy', and pushes Margaret to practise the piano rather than answering her inquisitive, lively child's questions about the war and whether her parents say their prayers. The next scene shows Doris as a grandmother with Jackie, Margaret's daughter; now affectionate and lenient, by contrast to her relationship with Margaret.

== Roles ==
Roles	Premiere Cast, 25 February 1987 Manchester, Contact Theatre	Revised Version, 23 February 1989 London, Royal Court Theatre	Modern Revival, 29 September 2009 Watford, Watford Palace Theatre	London Revival, 13 April 2016 London, St. James' Theatre
Doris Partington	Joan Campion	Elizabeth Bradley	Eve Pearce	Maureen Lipman
Margaret Bradley	Jenny Howe	Sheila Reid	Abigail Thaw	Caroline Faber
Jackie Metcalfe	Jane Paton	Jane Gurnett	Claire Brown	Katie Brayben
Rosie Metcalfe	Michele Wade	Shirley Henderson	Katherine Manners	Serena Manteghi
Directed by	Brigid Larmour	Michael Attenborough	Brigid Larmour	Paul Robinson

== Productions ==
My Mother Said I Never Should was written in 1985 and was first produced at the Contact Theatre in Manchester on 25 February 1987, directed by Brigid Larmour. A revised edition premiered at the Royal Court Theatre in a production directed by Michael Attenborough on 23 February 1989 and in a revival which premiered on 29 September 2009 at the Watford Palace Theatre, again directed by Brigid Larmour.

The play has frequently been revived internationally. It was for many years the most performed drama by a female playwright, until it was overtaken by The Vagina Monologues.

== Awards and nominations ==
Awards

- 1987: The Royal Court/George Devine Award
- 1987: The Manchester Evening News Theatre Award for Best New Play.

Nominations

- 1990: Laurence Olivier Most Promising Newcomer Award
