= Hair analysis =

Chemical analysis of a hair sample

- Schema depicting how human hair appears in a scanning electron microscope
- HCPCS-L2: P2031

Hair analysis may refer to the chemical analysis of a hair sample, but can also refer to microscopic analysis or comparison. Chemical hair analysis may be considered for retrospective purposes when blood and urine are no longer expected to contain a particular contaminant, typically three months or less.

Its most accepted use is in the fields of forensic toxicology and in environmental toxicology. This can be used to test for the presence of certain drugs in a subject's system, such as during a pre-employment screening. Several alternative medicine fields also use various hair analyses for environmental toxicology, but these uses are controversial, evolving, and not standardized.

Microscopic hair analysis has traditionally been used in forensics as well, which goes beyond simple comparison of hair color. Analysts examine a number of different characteristics of hairs under a microscope, usually comparing hair taken from a crime scene and hair taken from a suspect. However, DNA testing of evidence has cast microscopic hair analysis into disrepute. DNA analysis has shown many claimed hair matches were in fact faulty, even ones conducted by what the field considered experts. This led to the overturning of many convictions that relied on hair analysis. Since 2012, the US Department of Justice has conducted a study of cases in which hair analysis testimony was given by its agents, and found that a high proportion of testimony could not be supported by the state of science of hair analysis.

== Biology of hair ==
Hair consists of various characteristics that can be of use in a forensic examination and analysis. To the core, hair is composed of keratin, water, minerals, and lipids. Hair consist of two distinctions parts, the hair shaft and the hair root. The shaft is composed of 3 layers, first being the medulla which is the inner core (if present), the second being the cortex which is the middle layer composed of multiple cells, and then lastly the cuticle which is the outer layer. The hair root is the bulbous portion of the hair shaft that resides in the hair follicle with the surrounding cells in the hair follicle that allow for production of hair and its growth. There are three phases of hair growth; anagen, catagen and telogen. In the anagen phase, the hair root actively creates the hair shaft. In the catagen and telogen phases, it regresses and gets ready for the following cycle. As hair shedding is a natural process, hairs tend to be found in the anagen phase when collected for analysis rather than the regression phase . This can cause issues in analysis as the follicular tag which is located on the hair follicle must be present to be able to analyze it with DNA analysis. If no follicular tag is present, the hair is sent for mitochondrial DNA (mt-DNA), as this is the only way to truly identify there source of hair. In theory, all human hairs are suitable sources for mitochondrial DNA.

== In forensic toxicology ==
Chemical hair analysis is used for the detection of many therapeutic drugs and recreational drugs, including cocaine, heroin, benzodiazepines and amphetamines. Hair analysis is less invasive than a blood test, if not quite as universally applicable. In this context, it has been reliably used to determine compliance with therapeutic drug regimes or to check the accuracy of a witness statement that an illicit drug has not been taken. Hair testing is an increasingly common method of assessment in substance misuse, particularly in legal proceedings, or in any situation where a subject may have decided not to tell the entire truth about his or her substance-using history. Post-mortem hair sample analysis can also be performed, to allow for determination of long-term drug use or poisoning. It is also used by employers, who test their employees.

Hair analysis has the virtue of showing a 'history' of drug use due to hair's slow growth. Urine analysis might detect drugs taken in the past 2–3 days; hair analysis can sometimes detect use as far as 90 days, although certain cosmetic treatments (e.g. dyeing hair) can interfere with this. Notably, basic drugs get incorporated into hair to a greater extent than neutral or acidic drugs, e.g. amphetamines and cocaine are present in higher concentrations in hair compared with benzodiazepines and cannabinoids.

Large-scale drug screening (or urine, hair and other samples) is usually done using enzyme-linked immunosorbent assays (ELISA). Positive ELISA findings are followed by confirmatory testing with liquid chromatography–mass spectrometry (LC-MS) or gas chromatography–mass spectrometry (GC-MS). Chromato-mass-spectrometry is less likely to result in false positive findings than ELISA, but the former requires expensive equipment and highly trained personnel.

The judicial admissibility of the test in the United States is guided by the Daubert standard. A notable court case was United States v. Medina, 749 F.Supp. 59 (E.D.N.Y.1990).

== Microscopic hair analysis in forensics ==
Microscopic hair analysis consists of the comparison of several strands of hair under a microscope and determining if the physical characteristics of each individual hairs are consistent with each other or not. It was accepted as a forensic science by the 1950s. Researchers often monitored more than a dozen attributes, including pigment distribution and scale patterns. This technique has been used in criminal investigations to try to tie hair found at a crime scene, or other location of note, and confirm if the hair matches that of a suspect. While a simple hair color match might be consistent with a certain suspect having been at the scene – black hair at the scene when the suspect has black hair – microscopic hair analysis began to claim a stronger standard by the 1970s. Rather than merely "narrow the field" of possibilities, hair analysts claimed to be able to match a specific person, such that the hair could be 'proof' of a specific suspect's presence. While the typed reports often hedged the certainty of microscopic hair analysis, witnesses in court would not always be as modest. The manager of the Montana state crime lab testified there was a "1 in 10,000 chance" that hairs found at a crime scene did not come from the suspect in one case, for example.

Microscopic hair analysis has a long tradition of being used in crime fiction as well; it was originally popularized in the Sherlock Holmes series before being widely used by the police. Fictional TV programs involving police procedurals and detectives have continued to use it since, including Columbo, Quincy, M.E., Dexter, and CSI.

In hair analysis, it is a basic requirement and a needed skill to be able to distinguish between what is human hair and what is animal or non human hair. To firstly determine the nature of these hairs it is necessary to do a visual examination of the hairs following with a low-power microscopic examination. When comparing the medulla if its present, central core of the hair shaft there is a measurement between the relative diameter of the medulla when compared to the overall hair diameter which is the medullary index. This is also a key difference between both hairs as human medullary indexed are around 1/3 index and animal hairs are usually over 1/2 index. This may not be the most reliable analysis up to date as the medulla can or cannot be present and varies between individuals. Another method would be to examine and look at the scale patterns found within the cuticle of the hair.

The cuticle is the outermost layer of the hair shaft, within the cuticle there are scale patterns which can help identify the origin of the hair, whether it is human hair or not. These are the different types of scale patterns observed on hair and how theses can help in the identification of its origin with the use of microscopic analysis;

- Coronal patterns: Often never found on human hairs, they can be found on small rodents and bats. They're usually found on hairs of very fine diameter. This scale pattern resembles a stack of cups or crowns.
- Imbricate patterns: Mostly found on human hairs and have scales that overlap laterally and longitudinally to encircle and enclose the cortex.
- Spinous patterns: Never found on human hairs and are more seen in animal hairs. This pattern exhibits triangular shaped scaled which often protrude from the hair shaft.

All of these differentiation factors and examinations points will help determine whether the hair is human or non human thanks to microscopic analysis.

Microscopic analysis is not widely accepted in the court of law anymore. It is not individualizing enough, therefore it is used to eliminated individuals of interest. Hair microscopy analysis cannot uniquely identify an individual. DNA analysis and Chemical analysis are more accepted in the court of law as they are more accurate in results and can determine a conclusive answer. U.S. Department of Justice guidelines cite that "hair comparison has been demonstrated to be a valid and reliable scientific methodology, although microscopic hair comparison cannot lead to person identification and it is crucial that this limitation be conveyed."

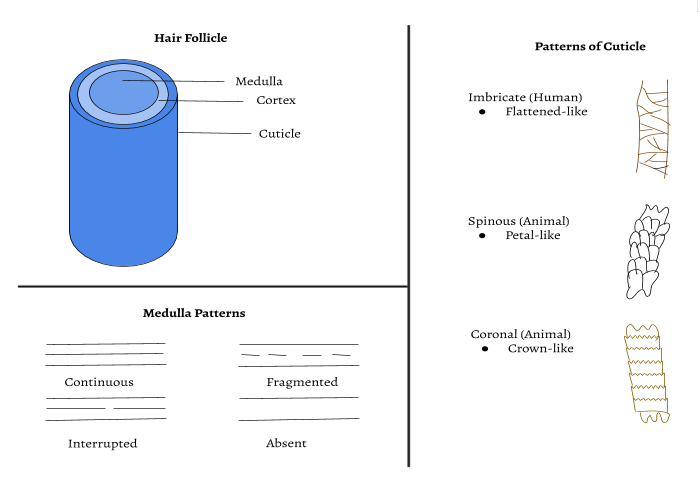
The image depicts different properties that make up a strand of hair.

Skepticism about the stronger claims used by witnesses in the 1970s and 1980s existed at the time. Researchers said in 1974 that the whole process was inherently subjective, and the FBI wrote in 1984 that hair analysis cannot positively match one single person. In the 1990s, DNA profiling was introduced as a key new technique into forensics investigations; it introduced a new level of certainty about matching suspects to evidence. DNA analysis of old cases from the 1970s and 80s, however, contradicted conclusions about a number of earlier matches on the basis of hair analysis.

In 1994, the Justice Department created a task force which would eventually review 6,000 cases by 2004, focusing on the work of one particularly zealous examiner, Michael Malone. These reviews came after reports that sloppy work by examiners at the FBI lab was producing unreliable forensic evidence in court trials. At first, these investigations were largely kept quiet; The Washington Post reported that "Instead of releasing those findings, they made them available only to the prosecutors in the affected cases." A study of FBI Laboratory hair analysis cases between 1996 and 2000 was released in 2002 by Max M. Houck and Bruce Budowle. The study showed that 11% of hair analysis "matches" were contradicted by DNA analysis. As the set of cases analyzed was one which would be expected to favor matches strongly in any case – only hair of individuals the police already believed to be potential suspects was sent in – this error rate was considered to be extremely high.

Kirk L. Odom was convicted of rape in Washington, DC in 1982 by no physical evidence except microscopic hair analysis performed by the FBI Crime Laboratory. Combined with a witness's identification in a line-up (another technique which modern research has shown to be much less reliable than previously thought), Odom was sentenced to twenty or more years in jail. DNA analysis, however, proved that Odom was entirely innocent. While Odom had been released from prison in 2003, he was officially exonerated in 2012 and was paid a large settlement by the city.

In a similar case, Santae Tribble was convicted in 1979 at the age of 17 in Washington, DC of murder due to FBI testimony in a hair analysis match of hair found at the scene. But he had three witnesses who gave him an alibi for the time when the crime was committed. The prosecutor overstated the reliability of hair analysis in identifying a single person, saying in his closing statement that "There is one chance, perhaps for all we know, in 10 million that it could [be] someone else's hair." DNA testing in January 2012, however, showed that the prosecution's key piece of evidence, the hair, did not in fact match the defendant. Tribble was fully exonerated in December 2012, having served 28 years in prison that resulted in severe health problems.

The outcry from defense attorneys about the unreliability of hair analysis and overstatement by FBI experts has resulted in the FBI conducting a review of disputed hair analysis matches since 2012. Due to what it found, in July 2013 the Justice department began an "unprecedented" review of older cases involving hair analysis, examining more than 21,000 cases referred to the FBI Lab's hair unit from 1982 through 1999.

By 2015, these cases included as many as 32 death penalty convictions, in which FBI experts may have exaggerated the reliability of hair analysis in their testimony and affected the verdict. Of these, 14 persons have been executed or died in prison. In 2015, DOJ released findings on 268 trials examined so far in which hair analysis was used (the review was still in progress). The review concluded that in 257 of these 268 trials (95 percent), the analysts gave flawed testimony in court that overstated the accuracy of the findings in favor of the prosecution. About 1200 cases remained to be examined. The department emphasized its commitment to following up on these cases to correct any wrongs, saying that they "are committed to ensuring that affected defendants are notified of past errors and that justice is done in every instance. The department and the FBI are also committed to ensuring the accuracy of future hair analysis, as well as the application of all disciplines of forensic science."

In 2017, new Attorney General Jeff Sessions, appointed by President Donald Trump, announced that this investigation would be suspended, at the same time that he announced the end of a forensic science commission that had been working to establish standards on several tests and to improve accuracy; it was a "partnership with independent scientists to raise forensic science standards". Independent scientists, prosecutors, defense counsel and judges criticized ending the commission, saying that the criminal justice system needed to rely on the best science.

As of late 2019, 75 people who were convicted of a crime based on microscopic hair comparison were subsequently exonerated. Another notable case that received media attention since was Anthony Broadwater, who had been convicted of raping Alice Sebold in 1982, and was formally exonerated in 2021 after finishing his time in 1998. The only physical evidence the prosecution offered in 1982 was a hair analysis that was "consistent" with Broadwater. More alarmingly, the only reason the case was re-examined was the unusual fact that Sebold had written an extensive memoir of her experiences (Lucky), which allowed later investigators to uncover major problems with the case.

== In environmental toxicology ==
Analysis of hair samples has many advantages as a preliminary screening method for the presence of toxic substances deleterious to health after exposures in air, dust, sediment, soil and water, food and toxins in the environment. The advantages of hair analysis include the non-invasiveness, low cost, and the ability to measure a large number of, potentially interacting, toxic and biologically essential elements. Hence, head hair analysis is increasingly being used as a preliminary test to see whether individuals have absorbed poisons linked to behavioral or health problems.

=== Detection of long-term elemental effects ===
The use of hair analysis appears to be valid for the measurement of lifelong, or long-term heavy metal burden, if not the measurement of general elemental analysis. Several studies, including the analysis of Ludwig van Beethoven's hair, have been conducted in conjunction with the National Institutes of Health and Centers for Disease Control and Prevention.

In a 1999 study on hair concentrations of calcium, iron, and zinc in pregnant women and effects of supplementation, it was concluded that "From the analyses, it was clear that hair concentrations of Ca, Fe, and Zn could reflect the effects of supplementation... Finally, it could be concluded that mineral element deficiencies might be convalesced by adequate compensations of mineral element nutrients."

=== Occupational, environmental and alternative medicine ===
Hair analysis has been used in occupational, environmental and some branches of alternative medicine as a method of investigation to assist screening and/or diagnosis. The hair is sampled, processed and analyzed, studying the levels of mineral and metals in the hair sample. Using the results, as part of a proper examination or test protocol, practitioners screen for toxic exposure and heavy metal poisoning. Some advocates claim that they can also diagnose mineral deficiencies and that people with autism have unusual hair mineral contents. These uses are often controversial, and the American Medical Association states, "The AMA opposes chemical analysis of the hair as a determinant of the need for medical therapy and supports informing the American public and appropriate governmental agencies of this unproven practice and its potential for health care fraud." A recent review of scientific literature by Dr Kempson highlighted analysis of metals/minerals in hair can be applied in large population studies for researching epidemiology and groups of chronically exposed populations, however any attempt to provide a diagnosis based on hair for an individual is not possible. An exception to this can be in advanced analyses for acute poisoning.

== Literature ==
- Pragst F., Balikova M.A.: State of the art in hair analysis for detection of drugs and alcohol abuse; Clinica Chimic Acta 370 2006 17–49.
- Auwärter V.: Fettsäureethylester als Marker exzessiven Alkoholkonsums – Analytische Bestimmung im Haar und in Hautoberflächenlipiden mittels Headspace-Festphasenmikroextraktion und Gaschromatographie-Massenspektrometrie. Dissertation Humboldt-Universität Berlin 2006.
- Pragst F.; Auwärter V.; Kiessling B.; Dyes C. (2004). "Wipe-test and patch-test for alcohol misuse based on the concentration ratio of fatty acid ethyl esters and squalen CFAEE/CSQ in skin surface lipids". Forensic Sci Int. 143 (2–3): 77–86. doi:10.1016/j.forsciint.2004.02.041. PMID 15240027.

== Bibliography ==
- Gaillard Y., Pepin G. (1999). "Testing hair for pharmaceuticals". J. Chromatogr. B. 733 (1–2): 231–246. doi:10.1016/s0378-4347(99)00263-7. PMID 10572983.
- Henderson, G.L., Harkey, M.R., Jones, R.T., "Analysis of Hair for Cocaine", in (eds. Edward. J. Cone, Ph.D., Michael. J. Welch, Ph.D., and M. Beth Grigson Babecki, M.A.), "Hair Testing for Drugs of Abuse: International Research on Standards and Technology", 1995, pp. 91–120. NIH Publication No. 95-3727.
- Kintz P (2007). "Bioanalytical procedures for detection of chemical agents in hair in the case of drug-facilitated crimes". Anal. Bioanal. Chem. 388 (7): 1467–74. doi:10.1007/s00216-007-1209-z. PMID 17340077. S2CID 28981255.
- Nakahara Y (1999). "Hair analysis for abused and therapeutic drugs". J. Chromatogr. B. 733 (1–2): 161–180. doi:10.1016/s0378-4347(99)00059-6. PMID 10572981.
- Romolo F.S.; Rotolo M.C.; Palmi I.; Pacifici R.; Lopez A. (2003). "Optimized conditions for simultaneous determination of opiates, cocaine and benzoylecgonine in hair samples by GC-MS". Forensic Science International. 138 (1–3): 17–26. doi:10.1016/j.forsciint.2003.07.013. PMID 14642715.
- Sachs H. Kintz (1998). "Testing for drugs in hair. Critical review of chromatographic procedures since 1992". J. Chromatogr. B. 713 (1): 147–161. doi:10.1016/S0378-4347(98)00168-6. PMID 9700557.
