= Peter Corby =

British inventor (1924–2021)

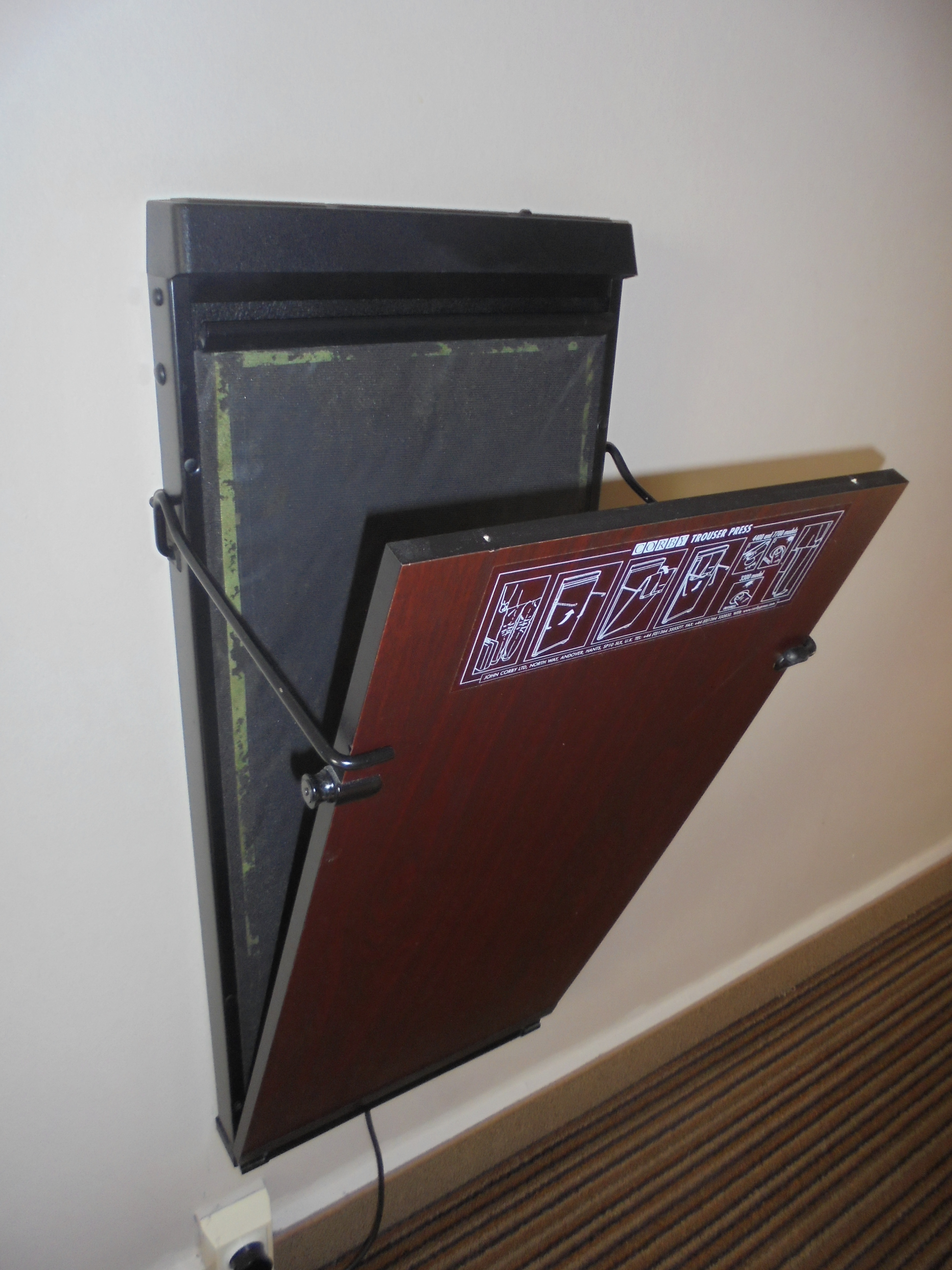
A Corby trouser press

Peter John Siddons Corby (8 July 1924 – 5 August 2021) was a British inventor. He joined the Royal Air Force Volunteer Reserve after leaving school and served as a flight engineer with No. 78 Squadron RAF in the last weeks of the Second World War. Corby remained with the RAF after the war serving in teaching and maintenance roles as well as with No. 15 Squadron RAF. He retired in 1951 to join his father's business making valet stands. Corby was inspired by a meeting with an aeronautical engineer who had developed electrical heating systems for the Concorde supersonic aircraft. Corby utilised these systems in the Corby trouser press, which was sold widely to hotel chains. Corby sold his company in 1977 and retired to the Isle of Wight. He entered the insurance industry as an underwriter at Lloyd's of London but lost much of his wealth during an insurance crisis in the 1990s.

== Early life and military career ==
Corby was born in Leamington Spa, Warwickshire, on 8 July 1924. He was the youngest son of John Siddons Corby and Helen, née Ratray. The family middle name came from the surname of Peter Corby's great-great-great grandfather William, husband of Sarah Siddons. His sister was Jane, who became an actress and socialite. The family soon moved to Buckinghamshire, to a house near the River Thames. John Corby began a business, bearing his name, that, from 1930, sold valet stands on which men's suits could be hung. John Corby's first customer was the Austin Reed chain of gentleman's outfitters.

Peter Corby was at Taplow Grammar School. He left the school in September 1943 to enlist in the Royal Air Force Volunteer Reserve (RAFVR). He was mobilised the following February and trained as a flight engineer. Corby joined No. 78 Squadron RAF and flew in Handley Page Halifax bombers during the last weeks of the Second World War in Europe. The squadron, and Corby, were transferred to RAF Transport Command after the war and converted to Douglas C-47 Skytrain aircraft.

From August 1945 Corby was posted to a series of RAF training schools and maintenance units. He returned to combat units in early 1948, joining No. 15 Squadron RAF which flew Avro Lincoln bombers. His service included a deployment to the Suez Canal Zone. Corby was appointed a pilot officer in the RAFVR training branch on 26 October 1949 He resigned his commission on 4 June 1951.

Corby married Gail Clifford-Marshall in 1950 but the marriage was dissolved in 1959; they had two sons.

== Trouser press ==
Corby left the RAF to help his sick father run the family business. Corby's father died in 1955. The business was inherited by the company's works manager but Corby spent the next ten years gradually buying it from him. Corby married Ines Mandow in 1960; they had one son, John, who became a yacht designer and town councillor.

John Corby Ltd had for some time sold a non-electrical trouser press, designed to press creases out of men's suit trousers. Corby by chance met an aeronautical engineer involved in the design of the supersonic Concorde passenger aircraft. He had devised a means of electrically heating the aircraft's moveable nose cone to prevent freezing at high altitudes. Corby realised that this could be incorporated into the trouser press to improve its performance.

The new Corby trouser press featured two leg-length electrically-heated pads capable of reaching 60 °C (140 °F) which would press the trousers overnight to remove creases. Corby negotiated with a number of hotel chains to lease the product which was commercially successful. Corby also developed an electric tie-press but this enjoyed less success.

== Later life ==
Corby sold John Corby Ltd in 1977 to Thomas Jourdan plc, which owned the Mary Quant fashion brand. The company was sold a number of times and is now known as Corby of Windsor. By the start of the 21st century the Corby trouser press was being exported to 60 countries.

Since 1974 Corby had been a "name", a private insurance underwriter at Lloyd's of London, and invested the proceeds from the sale of John Corby Ltd into this venture. He was also a non-executive director of a number of companies.

A keen sailor, Corby made several Atlantic crossings in the 1970s, making use of navigational techniques learnt in the RAF. He retired to Cowes on the Isle of Wight in 1980. His house there contained several of his inventions, including a model train layout that lowered from his garage roof.

Corby lost much of his wealth in an insurance industry crisis in the 1990s. He died on 5 August 2021, leaving an estate of just £204,454.
