= Treasure Island (1995 film) =

1995 British television film

- Based on: Treasure Island by Robert Louis Stevenson
- Written by: Ken Russell
- Directed by: Ken Russell
- Starring: Hetty Baynes
- Music by: Adrian Sutton
- Country of origin: United Kingdom
- Original language: English

Production
- Producer: Maureen Murray
- Cinematography: Hong Manley
- Editor: Xavier Russell
- Running time: 63 minutes
- Production company: Dreamgrange

Original release
- Network: Channel 4
- Release: 24 December 1995

Treasure Island is a 1995 British made-for-TV musical film written and directed by Ken Russell, based on the 1883 novel Treasure Island by Robert Louis Stevenson. It stars Russell's then-wife Hetty Baynes as a genderswapped Long John Silver.

== Cast ==
- Hetty Baynes as Long Jane Silver
- Gregory Hall as Jim Hawkins
- Michael Elphick as Billy Bones
- Charles Augins as Blind Pew
- Osmund Bullock as Captain Smollett
- Martin Burns as Itchy
- Jeanette Driver as Lani
- Bob Goody as Dr. Livesey
- Georgina Hale as Mum
- John Halstead
- Royce Mills
- Joe Bradley
- Michael Chmielewski
- Martin Francis
- Barry Lowe
- Erick Rainey
- Stephen Tiller
- Scott Woods

== Production ==
Russell said he made the film "to prove a point and enjoy myself at the same time. For it is my contention that most of the literary classics we see on television are generally too long, too slow, too samey, too costly and just too, too twee."

Russell wanted to make a literary adaptation that was low budget and done with a small crew. He pitched the idea to Channel Four who were enthusiastic. Russell put forward 12 titles and they selected Treasure Island because it could be programmed as a Christmas movie.

Russell adored the novel as a boy and made a film of it while young. He wrote "My aim is to tell the story from Jim's point of view, which is where I begin to part company with the novel, which splits much of the narrative equally between Jim and Dr Livesey - a senior member of the expedition. To my way of thinking, this is one of the major flaws in the book and I feel I'm doing Robert Louis a favour in rectifying it."

Russell made a number of other changes including casting Long John Silver as a woman and making Jim more of a "scamp".

== Songs ==
- "The Scrubbing Song" composed by Larrington Walker
- "Sexy" composed by Adrian Sutton, Barry Kirsch & Gary Shail. Lyrics by Ellie Bird
- "More Than Just a Friend" Music by Jonathan Parry-Price, Lyrics by Rufus Stone
- "The Pirates' Song" composed by Adrian Sutton, Barry Kirsch & Gary Shail. Lyrics by Ellie Bird
- "Sexy" (reprise)
- "Finale"
