= Xanthe Elbrick =

English actress

- Born: Xanthe Eleanora Marie Davina Elbrick; 1 December 1978 (age 46); London, England
- Occupation: Actress

Xanthe Eleanora Marie Davina Elbrick (born 1 December 1978) is an English Tony Award-nominated stage actress. The youngest of four children, Xanthe (pronounced 'Zanthee') was born in London, England, and attended Benenden School.

She was trained at RADA (London) and at the Actors Studio (New York City). She graduated with a Masters in philosophy from the University of Edinburgh in 2000, where she was director of the Edinburgh Footlights Theatre Company.

In 2007, she appeared as Young Alexander Ashbrook and Aaron in the Broadway production of Helen Edmundson's Coram Boy.

She has voiced the female Sith Inquisitor player character in Star Wars: The Old Republic since the game's launch in 2011.
