= Catrin Aaron =

Welsh actress

- Born: Rhyl, Clwyd, Wales
- Education: Rhyl High School; Royal Welsh College of Music and Drama
- Occupation: Actress
- Years active: 2002–present

Catrin Aaron is a Welsh actress who trained at the Royal Welsh College of Music and Drama. She is an associate for Theatr Clwyd and has been part of the Globe Ensemble at Shakespeare's Globe since 2018. She lives in London.

== Early life ==
Aaron was born and raised in Rhyl, Clwyd, where she attended Ysgol Bryn Hedydd and Rhyl High School. As a child, she often visited Theatr Clwyd with her mother.

== Career ==
In 2002, Aaron made her professional debut in Silas Marner at Theatr Clwyd. Since then, she has returned to Clwyd often, where she rose to fame as LV in The Rise and Fall of Little Voice in 2017. Wales Arts Review wrote of her performance: "Aaron’s beautiful renditions of classic songs were indistinguishable from the originals, the most moving being her performance of Edith Piaf’s ‘Non, je ne regrette rien’."

In 2015, Aaron was nominated for Best Female Performance in the English Language by the Welsh Theatre Awards for her role as The Manager in Contractions at the Chapter Arts Centre. The accolade was ultimately awarded to her Contractions co-star Sara Lloyd-Gregory, who played Emma.

Aaron is also a familiar face at Shakespeare's Globe, where she made her debut in the double-bill Hamlet and As You Like It, as Horatio and Phebe / Corin respectively. Her most recent performance there was in the Sam Wanamaker Playhouse, the Globe's indoor theatre, as the Widow in All's Well That Ends Well.

== Theatre ==
Year(s)	Title	Role	Theatre	Ref.
2002	The Cherry Orchard	Anya	Royal Welsh College of Music and Drama	
2002	Silence	Silence	Sherman Theatre	
2002	ImMortal	Performer	NoFit State Circus Theatre	
2002	Silas Marner	Eppie	Theatr Clwyd	
2003	Full Circle	Mrs E/Sherpa	Hijinx Theatre	
2003	Tartuffe	Marianne	Basingstoke Haymarket Theatre	
2004	The Three Musketeers	Constance	Basingstoke Haymarket Theatre	
2004	One Flew Over the Cuckoo's Nest	Nurse Flinn	Theatr Clwyd	
2004	Living Together	Annie	Basingstoke Haymarket Theatre	
2004	Round And Round The Garden	Annie	Basingstoke Haymarket Theatre	
2004	Hobson's Choice	Vickey	Theatr Clwyd	
2005	Flights of Fancy	Various	Theatr Clwyd	
2006	The Way It Was	Beryl	Theatr Clwyd	
2006	The Voyage	Mari	Theatr Clwyd	
2006	The Grapes of Wrath	Rose of Sharon	Theatr Clwyd	
2007	Of Mice And Men	Curley's Wife	Theatr Clwyd	
2007	Tales From Europe	Various	Theatr Clwyd	
2007	The Timeless Myths of the Mabinogi	Branwen	Theatr Clwyd	
2007	A Toy Epic	Mrs Blackwell/Miss Todd/Anne/Iorwerth's Mother	Theatr Clwyd	
2008	Macbeth	Third Witch	Theatr Clwyd	
2009	Twilight Tales	Various	Theatr Clwyd	
2009	Mary Stuart	Margaret Kurl	Theatr Clwyd	
2009	The Norman Conquests	Ruth	Torch Theatre	
2009	Festen	Mette	Theatr Clwyd	
2010	A Small Family Business	Harriet	Theatr Clwyd	
2010	Dancing At Lughnasa	Christina Mundy	Theatr Clwyd	
2011	Gaslight	Bella Manningham	Theatr Clwyd	
2011	Taking Steps	Elizabeth	Theatr Clwyd	
2011	Roots	Pearl Bryant	Theatr Clwyd	
2012	A Doll's House	Kristine Linde	Theatr Clwyd	
2012	What People Do (Let's Get Visceral)	Jane	The Old Vic Tunnels	
2012	God of Carnage	Annette	Theatr Clwyd	
2012	Humbug	Various	Theatr Clwyd	
2013	XX (Festopia)	Barbara	Theatre503	
2013	Salt, Root and Roe	Menna	Theatr Clwyd	
2013	Aristocrats	Alice	Theatr Clwyd	
2014	Contractions	The Manager	Chapter Arts Centre	
2014	The Fever	The Traveller	The Old Fire Station	
2014	Sex and the Three Day Week	Catherine	Liverpool Playhouse	
2015	The Forsythe Sisters	Diane	Gaggle Babble	
2015	The Light of Heart	Fan	Theatr Clwyd	
2015	All My Sons	Ann Deever	Theatr Clwyd	
2016	Cat on a Hot Tin Roof	Mae	Theatr Clwyd	
2016	Henry V	Fluellen	Regent's Park Open Air Theatre	
2017	The Rise and Fall of Little Voice	LV	Theatr Clwyd	
2017	The Wizard of Oz	Miss Gulch / Wicked Witch of the West	Sheffield Crucible	
2018	Hamlet	Horatio	Shakespeare's Globe	
2018	As You Like It	Phebe / Corin	Shakespeare's Globe	
2018/19	Macbeth	Lennox	Sam Wanamaker Playhouse	
2019	Orpheus Descending	Beulah Binnings	Theatr Clwyd / Menier Chocolate Factory	
2019	The Lovely Bones	Abigail Salmon	Birmingham Repertory Theatre / Tour	
2020	Macbeth: A Conjuring	Lennox	Sam Wanamaker Playhouse	
2021	Missing Julie	Christine	Theatr Clwyd	
2021	Isla	Isla / PC Jones	Theatr Clwyd / Royal Court Theatre	
2023	Romeo and Julie	Barb	National Theatre	
2024	Out of Season	Amy	Hampstead Theatre	
2024	Richard III	Hastings / Tyrell	Shakespeare's Globe	
2024	Our Country's Good	Liz Morden	Lyric Hammersmith	
2024/25	All's Well That Ends Well	Widow	Sam Wanamaker Playhouse	
2026	Henry V	Hostess / Queen Isabel / Governor of Harfleur	Royal Shakespeare Company	
2026	Atlantis	Claire	Theatr Clwyd / Chichester Festival Theatre	

== Filmography ==
=== Film ===
Year(s)	Title	Role	Ref.
2018	Apostle	Elaine	
2020	What a Carve Up!		
2022	Isla	Isla / PC Jones	

=== Television ===
Year(s)	Title	Role	Notes	Ref.
2006	Casualty	Kath Barber	Episode: "No Place Like..."	
2013	The Indian Doctor	Mrs. Germin	4 episodes	
2015	The Bastard Executioner	Lady Trula	2 episodes	
2017	First Ladies Revealed	Eleanor Roosevelt		
2023	Carnival Row	Molly Dombey	Episode: "An Unkindness of Ravens"	
2023	Coronation Street	Maggie	2 episodes	
2024	Truelove	Nurse Stephens	Episode 1.6	
2025	Dope Girls	Sylvia Scott	Episode: "Butter Wouldn't Melt"	

=== Radio ===
Year(s)	Title	Role	Station	Notes	Ref.
2023	The Medici	Catherine de' Medici	BBC Radio 4	2 episodes	
2024	The Specialist	Maggie	BBC Radio 4	3 episodes	

== Awards and nominations ==
Year	Award	Category	Nominated work	Result	Ref.
2015	Wales Theatre Awards	Best Female Performance in the English Language	Contractions	Nominated	
