= Anthony Broadwater =

American convicted and later exonerated of rape

Anthony Broadwater (born November 16, 1960) is an African American man who was wrongfully convicted of raping author Alice Sebold in 1982. His conviction was overturned in 2021 after significant flaws in the evidence and procedures used during his trial were brought to light. Broadwater's case has become a prominent example of the issues within the criminal justice system, particularly regarding wrongful convictions based on unreliable eyewitness testimony and discredited forensic methods.

== Early life and background ==
Anthony Broadwater was born in Syracuse, New York, near Syracuse University, where his father worked as a janitor. When he was five years old, his mother died of pneumonia. He dropped out of his high school, Henninger High School, to serve in the U.S. Marine Corps. Stationed at Twentynine Palms and Camp Pendleton, he was discharged after developing a cyst on his wrist. He returned to Syracuse to visit his father, who was ill with stomach cancer.

== Sebold case ==
=== Case and conviction ===
On May 8, 1981, Alice Sebold, a freshman at Syracuse University, was assaulted and raped while walking through Thornden Park in Syracuse. On October 5, 1981, she claimed to have recognized Broadwater on the street as her attacker. At the time, Broadwater was talking to a police officer he knew. Sebold stated that Broadwater called to her: “Hey, girl. Don’t I know you from somewhere?”

However, during a police lineup, Sebold did not initially identify Broadwater; she pointed to a different man. Despite this, Broadwater was prosecuted based on Sebold's courtroom identification and microscopic hair analysis, which was later discredited by the FBI.

In 1999, Sebold published her memoir, Lucky, in which she described every aspect of the rape in graphic detail. She used the fictitious name "Gregory Madison" for the rapist.

Broadwater was convicted in 1982 and sentenced to 8 1/3 to 25 years in prison. He served 16 years before being released in 1998, but his life continued to be heavily affected by the conviction as he was required to register as a sex offender, which severely limited his job prospects and social interactions.

=== Exoneration ===
Broadwater tried five times to have the conviction overturned, with at least as many groups of lawyers. When Timothy Mucciante began working as executive producer on a project to adapt Lucky to film, he noticed discrepancies in the portion of her book describing the trial. He later told The New York Times: "I started having some doubts—not about the story that Alice told about her assault, which was tragic, but the second part of her book about the trial, which didn't hang together". He ultimately was fired from the project when he did not provide funding as he had originally agreed, and subsequently hired a private investigator to review the evidence against Broadwater.

In November 2021, Broadwater was exonerated by a New York Supreme Court justice, who determined there had been serious issues with the original conviction. The conviction had relied heavily on two pieces of evidence: Sebold's testimony and microscopic hair analysis, a forensic technique the United States Department of Justice later found to be unreliable.

At the police lineup, which included Broadwater, Sebold had identified a different person as her rapist. When police told her she had identified someone other than Broadwater, she said the two men looked "almost identical". Defense attorneys arguing for Broadwater's exoneration asserted that, after the lineup, the prosecutor lied to Sebold, telling her that the man she had identified and Broadwater were friends, and that they both came to the lineup to confuse her. They also stated that Sebold wrote in Lucky that the prosecutor coached her into changing her identification. In 2021, Broadwater's new attorneys argued that this influenced Sebold's testimony. Onondaga County District Attorney William J. Fitzpatrick, who joined the motion to overturn the conviction, argued that suspect identification is prone to error, particularly when the suspect is a different race from the victim; Sebold is white and Broadwater is black.

After his exoneration, Broadwater said: "I'm not bitter or have malice towards her." A week later, Sebold publicly apologized for her part in his conviction, saying she was struggling "with the role that I unwittingly played within a system that sent an innocent man to jail" and that Broadwater "became another young black man brutalized by our flawed legal system. I will forever be sorry for what was done to him." The manner of Sebold's apology drew criticism from some observers, who noted that it was largely made in the passive voice and did not acknowledge any direct responsibility for Broadwater's conviction. Scribner, the publisher of Lucky, released a statement following Broadwater's exoneration that distribution of all formats of the book would cease.

After his conviction was vacated, Broadwater sued the state of New York in state court. In 2023, the state settled with Broadwater, awarding him US$5.5 million. Broadwater also filed a federal civil rights lawsuit against Onondaga County, the city of Syracuse, and an assistant district attorney and a police officer who were involved in prosecuting him. In 2024, the judge in the federal case refused a request from the former assistant district attorney, Gail Uebelhoer, allowing the case to proceed to discovery.

A documentary on the case was partly produced, but production was placed on indefinite hold after relations between Broadwater and Mucciante declined. In addition, the two production companies behind the documentary entered into a legal dispute with each other, with Unlucky Film Inc. filing a complaint in Michigan federal court alleging breach of contract and breach of fiduciary duty against Red Hawk Films. Unlucky Films accused Red Hawk Films of withholding documentary footage, and asked the court for damages and to enjoin Red Hawk Films from sharing or using the footage.

Broadwater endorsed Fitzpatrick for re-election as Onondaga County District Attorney in 2023, crediting him for his work on the exoneration.
