= Janne Stigen Drangsholt =

Norwegian writer (born 1974)

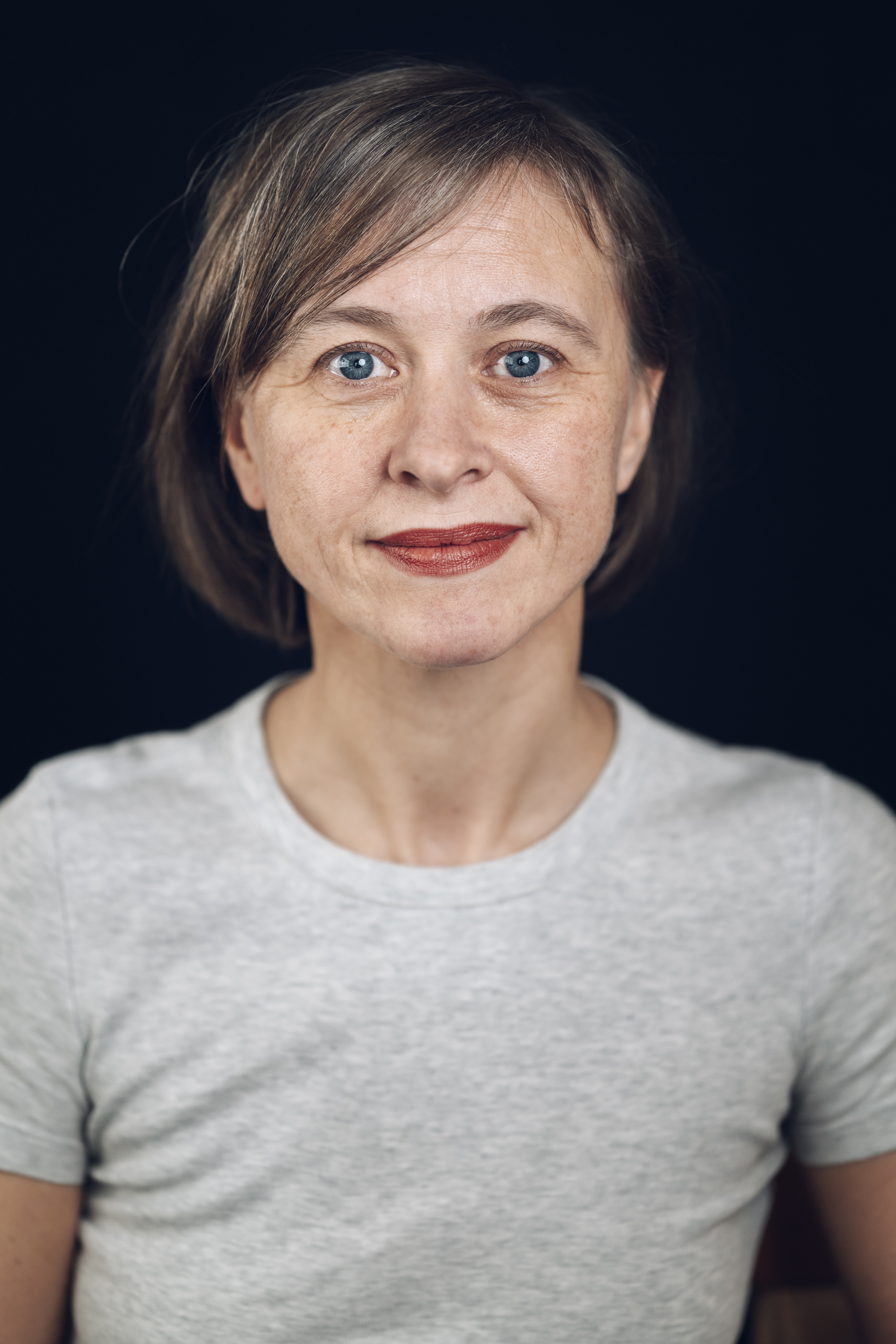
Drangsholt in 2020

Janne Stigen Drangsholt (born 1974) is a Norwegian philologist and novelist.

She grew up in Sandnes. As a philologist, she is a professor of English at the University of Stavanger since 2007.

More known as a novelist, she made her literary debut with Humlefangeren, published in 2011 on Tiden Norsk Forlag. She then started the series about professor and mother Ingrid Winter, also released on Tiden, initially with Ingrid Winters makeløse mismot (2015), Winter i verdens rikeste land (2016) and Winterkrigen (2018). The trilogy was expanded with Winterferie (2023). Writing for Store norske leksikon, Jakob Lothe characterizes her novels about Ingrid Winter as campus novels in the vein of Kingsley Amis.

Drangsholt was invited to NRK P1 where she co-hosted the Janne og Jostein-show. She also summarized literary classics in 4 minutes in the programme Utakt and published book with brief introductions to classics: Fra Shakespeare til Knausgård: 66 klassikere du naturligvis har lest (2020) and Fra Snorre til Skaranger: 66 norske klassikere du naturligvis har lest (2024). These books too were published by Tiden. She is also a subject editor in Store norske leksikon.
