= Adrian Sutton =

British composer (1967–2025)

Adrian Geoffrey Sutton (15 August 1967 – 10 October 2025) was a British composer, best known for his theatre music but also widely known for his symphonic and chamber music for the concert hall. He composed the scores for a series of well received National Theatre productions, including War Horse (2007) and The Curious Incident of the Dog in the Night-time (2011). In September 2022, Sutton was diagnosed with an incurable cancer from which he died in 2025.

== Life and career ==
Sutton was born on 15 August 1967 in Tenterden near Ashford, Kent. His family then moved to Zimbabwe and later to South Africa where he grew up. Returning to London he studied music at Goldsmiths. Before his success at the National Theatre, Sutton spent 15 years as a composer of "applied music", especially music for television commercials. He also composed the score for Ken Russell's 1995 film Treasure Island. After working with radio presenter Chris Morris on the music for his BBC Radio Blue Jam series (1997-99), Sutton was introduced to his brother, the theatre director Tom Morris. That led to a commission from the National Theatre in 2005 to write the score for Helen Edmundson's "play with music" Coram Boy, for which Sutton adapted and extended the music of Handel.

The score for War Horse two years later is interspersed with simple folk songs on which Sutton collaborated with John Tams. The orchestral sections combine an English folk idiom (folk songs as the spirit of the village) with symphonic material referencing both English and German traditions, drawing on his interest in English orchestral music of the early and mid-twentieth century (notably Elgar, Vaughan Williams and Walton). The Curious Incident score of 2011 was influenced by another enthusiasm - the electronic studio music of Mike Oldfield and Aphex Twin. While at Goldsmiths, Sutton studied electronic music, working on the Fairlight CMI digital sampling synthesizer.

Other scores for the National Theatre included Nation and The Revenger's Tragedy (both 2009), Husbands And Sons (D. H. Lawrence, adapted by Ben Power, 2015), Rules for Living (2015), and Angels in America (2018). For other theatres Sutton provided music for Cyrano de Bergerac (Bristol Old Vic, 2019), Dr. Semmelweis (Bristol Old Vic, 2022, adapting Schubert), and Murder On The Orient Express (Chichester, 2022).

After his diagnosis, Sutton worked exclusively on concert works. In June 2023 his Violin Concerto and other orchestral pieces, including an extended suite for orchestra constructed from the War Horse score, were performed at the Southbank Centre with the Royal Philharmonic Orchestra, soloist Fenella Humphreys, and subsequently recorded by Chandos Records.

Sutton was married to Matthew Gough, his longtime associate and producer. He died at home on 10 October 2025, at the age of 58.

== List of works ==
=== Orchestral ===
- Sinfonietta (2012)
- Some See Us (2014)
- A Fist Full Of Fives (2016)
- Montana Peaks (2018, rev. 2025)
- Short Story (2022)
- Concerto for Violin and Orchestra (2023)
- Five Theatre Miniatures (2005, 2023)
  1. 'The Departure' (2023)
  2. 'Intermezzo' (2023)
  3. 'Gigue' (2005)
  4. 'Polperro Beach' (2023)
  5. 'Contagion' (2023)
- Not Norwegian Dance (2023)
- War Horse orchestral suite (2023)
- Sap And Sinews (2024)

=== Orchestral-choral ===
- The Griffin And The Grail (2014)
- Some See Us (2014)
- War Horse: The Story In Concert (2018)
- An Advent Calendar (2024)

=== Ensemble ===
- Aerobatics Over Lake Wanaka (1998) for six pianos
- Bicycle Dance In Lanes Of Leaves And Light (1998) for two pianos
- Paxo Tango (2003) for soprano, baritone, string trio and piano
- Theatre Miniatures III: 'Gigue' (2005) for string ensemble
- Montana Peaks (2018, rev. 2025) for 11 players
- Trio Dances (2021) for string trio

=== Solo/duo ===
- Nostalgium (2008) for violin and piano
- Spring Masque (2011) for solo violin
- Arpeggiare Variations (2015) for solo violin
- Consolation (2017) for violin and piano
- Blackheath Crosslight (2019) for piano
- Pagvar (2020) for solo violin
- Eulogy (2021) for violin and piano

=== Choral ===
- Sweet Powell (2016)

=== Theatre ===
- Coram Boy (2005)
- War Horse (2007)
- Nation (2009)
- The Revenger's Tragedy (2009)
- Husbands And Sons (2015)
- Rules For Living (2015)
- Angels In America (2018)
- Cyrano de Bergerac (2019)
- Dr. Semmelweis (2022)
- Murder On The Orient Express (2022)
