= Charlotte Keatley =

English playwright

Charlotte Keatley (born 5 January 1960, London) is an English playwright. She studied drama at the Victoria University of Manchester and as a postgraduate at the University of Leeds. She has worked as a journalist for Performance magazine, The Yorkshire Post, the Financial Times and the BBC. She co-devised and performed in Dressing for Dinner, staged at the Theatre Workshop, Leeds, in 1983, and set up the performance art company, Royal Balle, in 1984.

Her first play, My Mother Said I Never Should, which she wrote in 1985, was first performed at the Contact Theatre, Manchester, in 1987, and won both the Royal Court/George Devine Award and the Manchester Evening News Theatre Award for Best New Play.The play was revised for a successful run at the Royal Court Theatre in 1989, and in 1990 she was nominated for the Laurence Olivier Most Promising Newcomer Award.

My Mother Said I Never Should was published in the UK by Methuen in 1988, and has been studied as an A-level set text for a number of years. It has subsequently been translated into 22 languages and has become the most performed play in the English language written by a woman. Waiting for Martin, a short monologue about the Falklands War, was produced by the English Shakespeare Company in 1987.

Charlotte Keatley was Judith E. Wilson Fellow in English at Cambridge University in 1989 and Writer in Residence for the New York Stage and Film Company in 1991. Later that year she co-directed at the Edinburgh Festival the first stage adaptation of Heathcote Williams' hefty polemical poem Autogeddon. It won an Edinburgh Festival Fringe First award.

She wrote the screenplay to Falling Slowly, for Channel 4, and the children's drama, Badger, for Granada Television. Her work for radio includes ten episodes of the BBC series Citizens, the play Is Green The Same For You (1989), and an adaptation of Mrs Gaskell's novel North and South.

In 2003, Charlotte Keatley was commissioned by the Royal Shakespeare Company to write an epic play set in Georgia and the Caucasus entitled All the Daughters of War.
