= Trouser press =

Electrical appliance for reshaping trousers

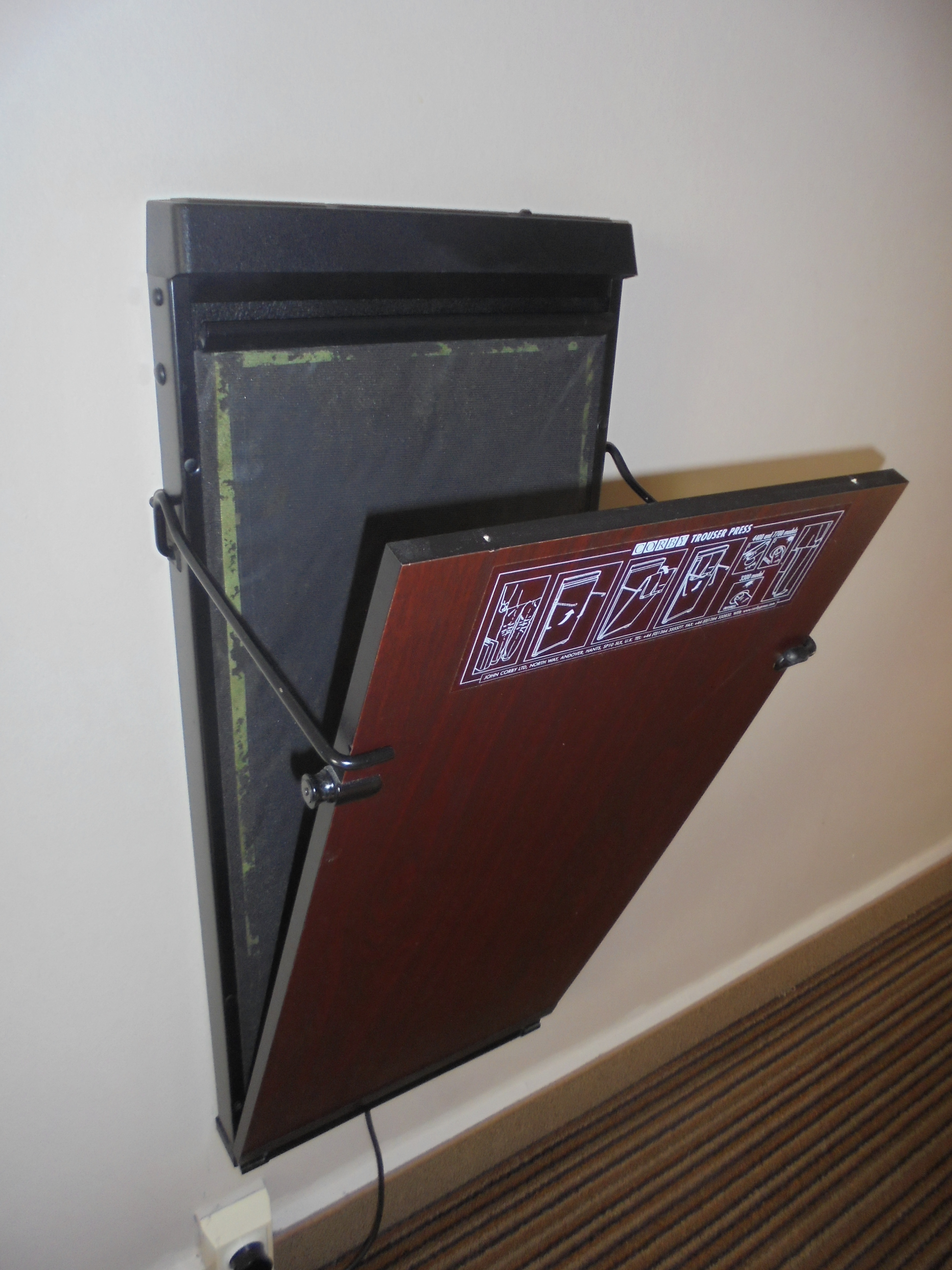
Wall-mounted Corby trouser press, open

A trouser press, also referred to by the trademarked name Corby trouser press, is an electrical appliance used to smooth the wrinkles from a pair of trousers. They are commonly provided in hotel rooms worldwide, though may also be purchased for home use; they are generally associated with use by businessmen who require a formal appearance to their suit.

RAF veteran Peter Corby, the inventor of the press, died in August 2021, at the age of 97.

== Trouser pressing process ==
Most trousers creases occur on the bottom two-thirds of trouser legs, particularly around the back of the knee. Trouser presses are typically the tool for removing these creases without damaging the trousers. On a typical trouser press, the side levers are raised; and the trousers placed between the pressing plate and the cushioned heating pad. The press is slowly closed, the trousers gently pulled so that they align properly and the press dial turned on for heat. The press heats to around 60 °C (140 °F) regardless of model type. It can take roughly 15 to 45 minutes to press the trousers depending on the model type and the thermostatically controlled heating pad will warm up and gently press out creases and wrinkles without scorching the trousers.

== Corby Trouser Press ==
The Corby Trouser Press brand is the generic trademark for the product. John Corby Limited was established by John Corby in Windsor, Berkshire, in 1930 as a manufacturer of valet stands. These were later improved with the addition of a pressing area and the first Corby trouser press was launched. These subsequently became electrically heated during the 1960s.

In 1977, John Corby Limited became part of what is now Jourdan plc and relocated to Andover, Hampshire in 1986. In 2005, the company moved manufacturing to the premises of a sister company, Suncrest Surrounds Limited in Peterlee, Co Durham. All sales, marketing and service operations continue to operate from Andover, though the business was acquired in 2009 by Fired Up Corporation Ltd, based in Huddersfield. The brand was later re-launched, reverting to its founding name of "Corby of Windsor".

== In popular culture ==
During the 1960s the trouser press was an aspirational product for the British middle classes, and this led to a thread of satire and cultural references. The Bonzo Dog Doo-Dah Band recorded the song, "Trouser Press", for their 1968 album The Doughnut in Granny's Greenhouse, satirising 1960s consumerism, and making numerous references to the trouser press as emblematic of middle class life. Author and journalist Ira Robbins founded an influential alternative music magazine titled Trouser Press after the Bonzo's song, and his book The Trouser Press Record Guide: The Ultimate Guide to Alternative Stone is a reference work on alternative and outlandish music first published in 1983 and the fourth edition was published in 1991 (ISBN 0-02-036361-3).

The ubiquitous presence of the trouser press in British commercial hotels has made them a recurring theme, along with "tea and coffee making facilities", in British comedian Bill Bailey's monologues. The Tea, Coffee and Trouser Press Census tour diary along is included as an extra feature on his Part Troll DVD. Bailey's Tinselworm show has a spoof infomercial in the style of Kraftwerk, Hosenbügler (German for trouser press), which sees Bailey and Kevin Eldon riding around the stage on Segways with trouser presses mounted on them. It has also been featured in the British comedy I'm Alan Partridge during the episode "Basic Alan" in which Alan dismantles a Corby Trouser Press in his bored desperation.

== See also ==
- Clothes iron
- Dadeumi, a mechanical way to smooth clothing, once traditional in Korea
- Ironing
- Mangle (machine)
