= Jamila Gavin =

British writer, born 1941

Jamila Gavin MBE FRSL
- Born: 9 August 1941 (age 85); Mussoorie, British India
- Occupation: Author
- Writing career
- Notable work: Coram Boy (2000)
- Notable awards: Whitbread Children's Book Award (2000)

Jamila Gavin MBE FRSL (born 9 August 1941) is a British writer who is known mainly for children's books, including several with Indian contexts.

== Life ==
Gavin was born on 9 August 1941 in Mussoorie in the United Provinces of India, in the present-day state of Uttarakhand in the Western Himalayas. Her Indian father and English mother had met as teachers in Iran. She learned to describe herself as "half and half". She says online that from her mixed background "I inherited two rich cultures which ran side by side throughout my life, and which always made me feel I belonged to both countries."

Gavin first visited England when she was six and settled there when she was 11. As an adult she worked in the music department of the BBC before becoming a writer. She wrote her first book, The Magic Orange Tree and Other Stories, in 1979. After her first child was born, she became aware that there were few children's books reflecting the experience of multi-racial children. She has also written books reflecting her childhood in India, particularly her Surya trilogy.

Gavin is a patron of the Shakespeare Schools Festival, a charity that allows schoolchildren across the UK to perform Shakespeare in professional theatres.

Gavin settled in Stroud, Gloucestershire before 1990 and was still living there in 2012. In 2016, she became one of the founders of the Stroud Book Festival, together with Cindy Jefferies.

== Writer ==
The Surya trilogy – The Wheel of Surya (1992), The Eye of the Horse (1994) and The Track of the Wind (1997) – is a family saga that follows two generations of Indian Sikhs and shows the impact of the British Empire and the Partition of India on their lives. All three books made Guardian Children's Fiction Prize shortlists; The Wheel of Surya was special runner-up.

Coram Boy won the 2000 Whitbread Prize as Children's Book of the Year. It is set in the 18th century, being based on the Foundling Hospital established in London by sea Captain Thomas Coram. According to a local newspaper, the story "has links to Gloucestershire." Coram Boy has been adapted for the stage by Helen Edmundson and produced by the Royal National Theatre in 2005–2006, garnering Edmundson an Olivier Award. It also ran on Broadway in 2007.

Three Indian Goddesses and Three Indian Princesses are collections of short stories based around Indian legends. Nine other short stories were collected as The Magic Orange Tree and Other Stories.

Grandpa Chatterji is a series for younger children, named after its first book, which was adapted for television in 1997. Other books in the series are Grandpa Chatterji's Third Eye and Grandpa's Indian Summer. The first book made the Smarties Prize shortlist for reader ages 6–8.

Jamila Gavin has also written The Robber Baron's Daughter, Forbidden Memories, I Want to be An Angel, Kamla and Kate, Someone's Watching, Someone's Waiting, The Hideaway and The Wormholers.

== Awards and honors ==
Gavin became a Fellow of the Royal Society of Literature in 2015. In the 2024 King's Birthday Honours, she was appointed a Member of the Order of the British Empire, for services to children's literature.

Awards for Gavin's writing
| Year | Title | Award | Result | Ref. |
|---|---|---|---|---|
| 1992 | The Wheel of Surya | Guardian Children's Fiction Prize | Shortlist | |
| 1994 | The Eye of the Horse | Guardian Children's Fiction Prize | Shortlist | |
| 1997 | The Track of the Wind | Guardian Children's Fiction Prize | Shortlist | |
| 2000 | Coram Boy | Whitbread Children's Book Award | Winner | |
| 2001 | The God at the Gate | Richard Imison Memorial Award | Shortlist | |
| 2014 | Blackberry Blue | Neustadt Prize for Children's Literature | Finalist | |

== Publications ==
- The Magic Orange Tree and other stories (1979)
- Three Indian Princesses (1987)
- The Singing Bowls (1989)
- See No Evil (2008)
- Grandpa Chatterji (1993)
- Surya trilogy
  - The Wheel of Surya (Methuen, 1992)
  - The Eye of the Horse (Methuen, 1994)
  - The Track of the Wind (Mammoth, 1997)
- Grandpa's Indian Summer (1995)
- The Wormholers (1996)
- The Girl Who Rode on a Lion
- The Temple by the Sea
- The Lake of Stars
- Our Favorite Stories (1997)
- The Monkey in the Stars, self-adapted as a play for children, Monkeys in the Stars (2001)
- Coram Boy (2000)
- Grandpa Chatterji's Third Eye (2006)
- Fine Feathered Friend (1996)
- Three Indian Goddesses (2001)
- Star Child on Clark Street
- Danger By Moonlight (2002)
- Out of India: Walking on My Hands
- Out of India: An Anglo Indian Childhood (1997)
- The Whistling Monster
- Celebration Stories, Coming Home
- An Interview With Jamila Gavin
- From Out of the Shadows
- The Blood Stone (2003)
- The Robber Baron's Daughter
- Deadly Friend (1994)
- I Want to be An Angel (1990)
- Forbidden Memories
- Kamla and Kate (1983)
- Kamla and Kate Again
- Someone's Watching, Someone's Waiting
- The Hideaway (1987)
- Double Dare
- Storyworlds (Heinemann, 1996), illustrated by Rhian Nest James
  - Grandma's Surprise
  - The Mango Tree
  - Presents
  - Who Did It?
- Digital Dan
- Ali and the Robots (1986)
- Stories From the Hindu World (1986)
- The Bow of Shiva
- The Turning Point
- Alexander the Greatest (Walker, 2009), illustrated by Sumito Sakakibara
- Fox
- Derka Derb
- Alexander the Great: Man, Myth, or Monster? (Walker, 2012), illustrated by David Parkins
- The Paradise Carpet
