= Cable Beach, Bahamas =

Beach and resort destination in the Bahamas

Coordinates: 25°04′40″N 77°24′42″W

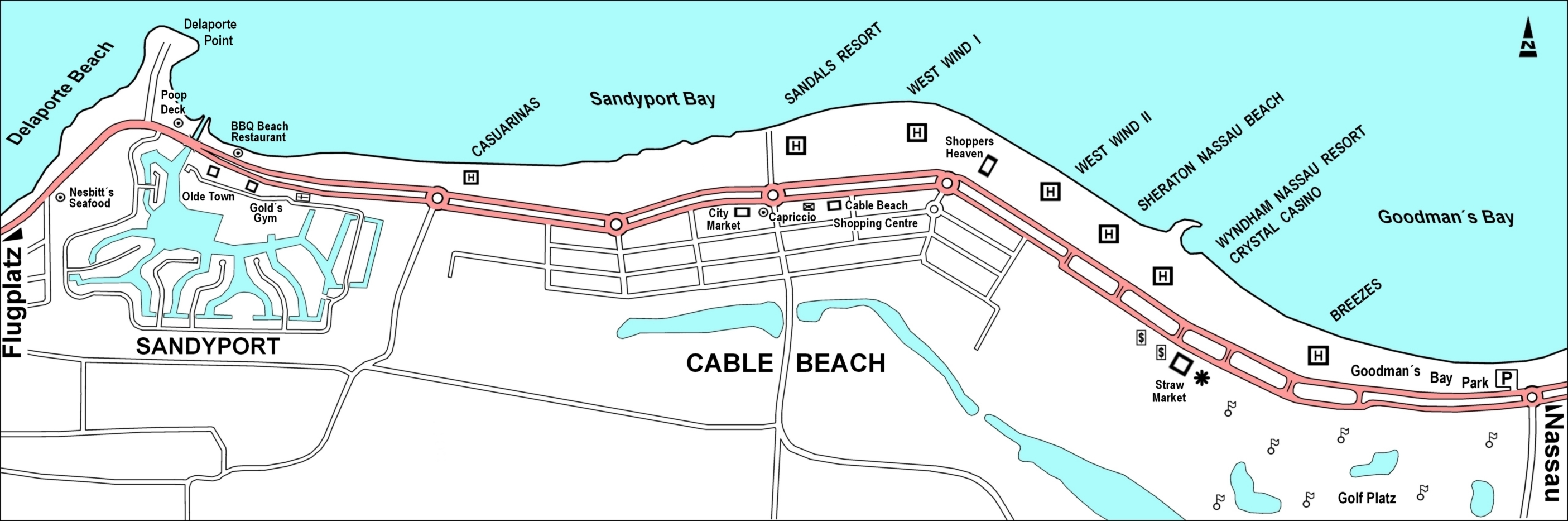
2009 map

Cable Beach is a beach, resort destination, and populated place on the northern coast of New Providence Island in the Bahamas west of Nassau. It spans two and a half miles. It is home to Pompey Market.

== History ==
It is said Cable Beach owes its name to an 1892 submarine telegraph cable linking Jupiter, Florida to Goodman's Bay.

Tourism in the area dates back as early as the 1940s, and by the 1950s, it had become a centre for hotel development. It was called the Bahamian Riviera.

The Emerald Beach Hotel, opened in 1954, was the first air conditioned hotel and opened the largest casino in the Bahamas. Although the hotel is defunct and has been replaced more than once, the casino is still in use to this day.

Howard Deering Johnson's first venture outside of the United States opened in 1958 in Cable Beach.

By the 1950s the area had become a centre for hotel development. Following a wave of redevelopment in the late 1980s, including the opening of the Crystal Palace Resort and Casino, the area was promoted as the "Bahamian Riviera".

Cable Beach experienced a period of instability in the wake of Bahamian independence and liberation as well as the rise of the newer Paradise Island and other tourism competitors. The PLP government headed by Lynden Pindling began buying failing hotels. A number of these were re-privatised in the 1990s when the FNM came into power.

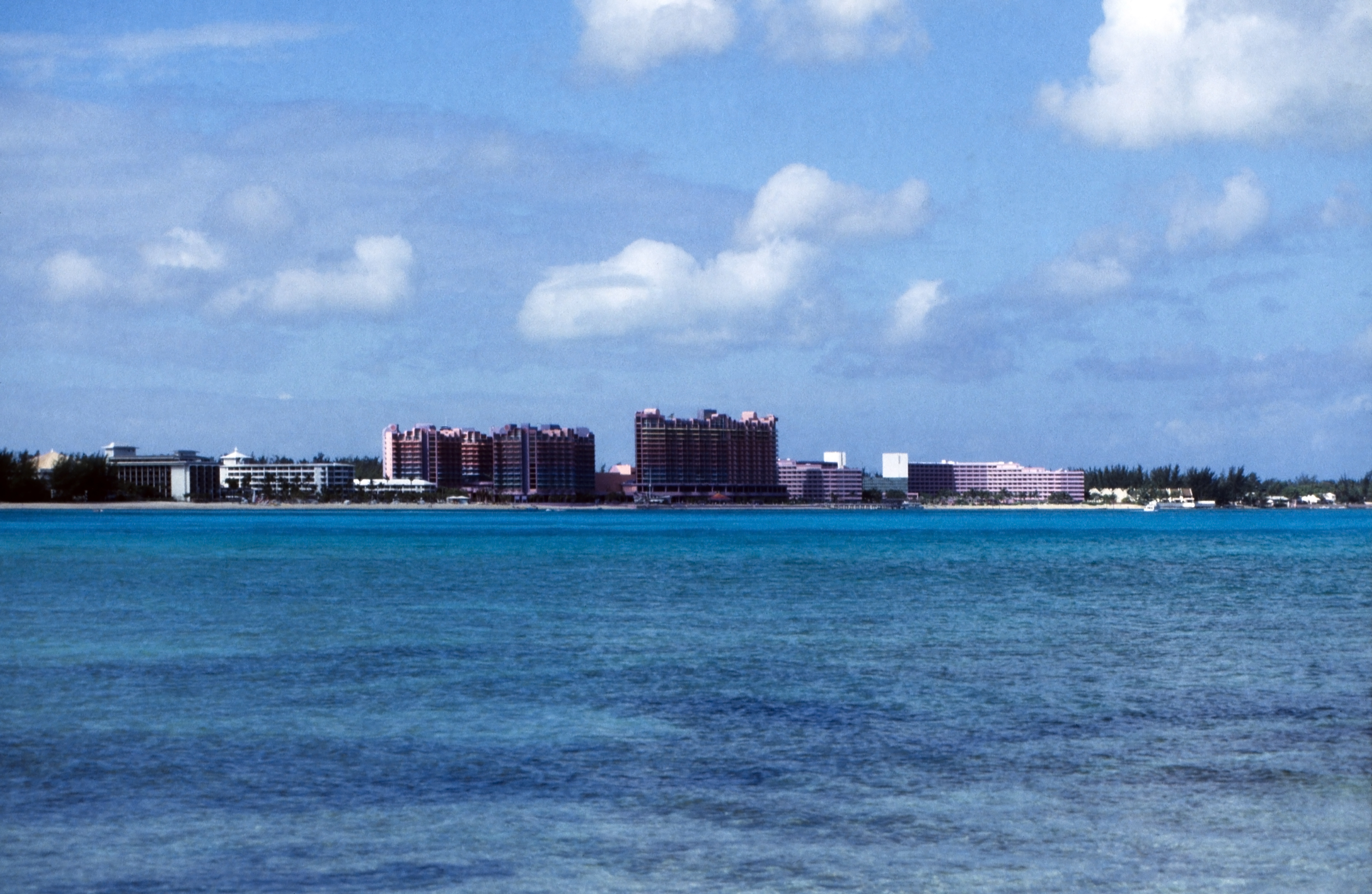
Skyline in 1988

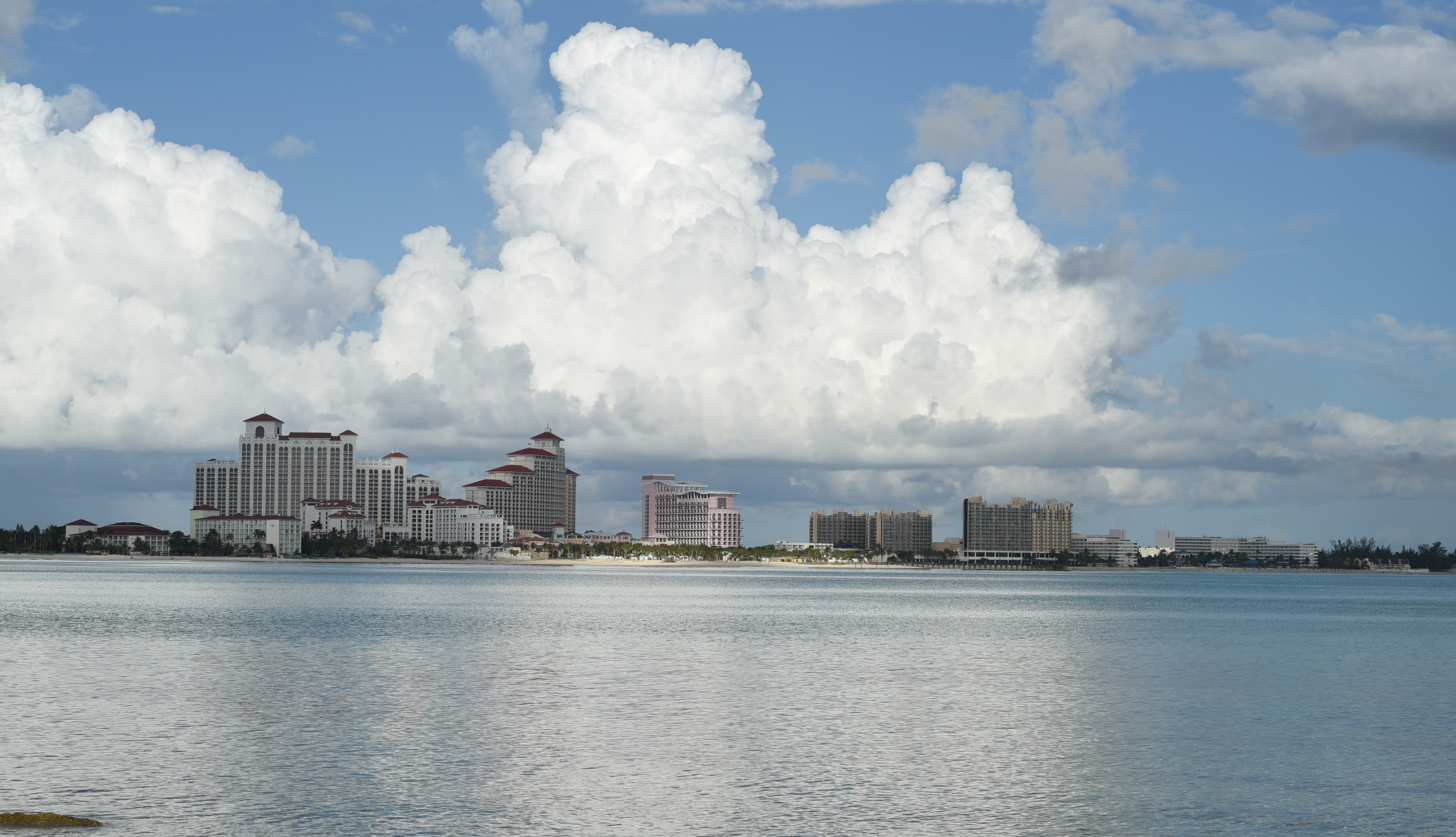
Skyline in 2015

== Resorts and hotels ==
- Goldwynn Resort and Residences
- Baha Mar
- Breezes
- Casuarinas
- Marley Resort and Spa
- Meliá Nassau Beach
- Ocean West Boutique Hotel
- Sandals Royal Bahamian
- Westwind Club

=== Defunct ===
- Ambassador Beach Hotel
- The Balmoral
- Crystal Palace Resort (replaced by Baha Mar)
- Hyatt Emerald Beach Hotel (replaced by Crystal Palace)
- Nassau Beach Lodge (replaced by Baha Mar)
- Sheraton Nassau Beach Resort (replaced by Meliá)
- Sonesta Beach Hotel
