= The Lovely Bones =

2002 novel by Alice Sebold

- Author: Alice Sebold
- Cover artist: Yoori Kim (design); Daniel Lee (photo-illustration)
- Language: English
- Genre: Novel
- Publisher: Little, Brown
- Publication date: 2002
- Publication place: United States
- Media type: Print (hardback and paperback); audiobook
- Pages: 328
- ISBN: 0-316-66634-3
- OCLC: 48495099
- Dewey Decimal: 813/.6 21
- LC Class: PS3619.E26 L68 2002

The Lovely Bones is a 2002 novel by American writer Alice Sebold. It is the story of a teenage girl who, after being raped and murdered, watches from a personal heaven as her family and friends struggle to move on with their lives while she comes to terms with her own death. The novel received critical praise and became an instant bestseller.

A film adaptation, directed by Peter Jackson, who personally purchased the rights, was released in 2009. The novel was also later adapted as a play of the same name, which premiered in England in 2018 and toured in several cities.

== Title ==
The novel's title is taken from a quotation at the novel's conclusion, when Susie ponders her friends' and family's newfound strength after her death:

These were the lovely bones that had grown around my absence: the connections—sometimes tenuous, sometimes made at great cost, but often magnificent—that happened after I was gone. And I began to see things in a way that let me hold the world without me in it. The events my death brought were merely the bones of a body that would become whole at some unpredictable time in the future. The price of what I came to see as this miraculous body had been my life.

== Plot ==
On December 6, 1973, 14-year-old Susie Salmon takes a shortcut home from school through a cornfield in Norristown, Pennsylvania. George Harvey, her 36-year-old neighbor, a bachelor who builds doll houses for a living, persuades her to look at an underground kid's hideout he constructed in the field. After she goes into the hideout, he rapes and murders her. He puts her remains in a safe that he dumps in a sinkhole, and throws her charm bracelet into a pond. Susie's spirit flees toward her personal Heaven; it rushes past her classmate, social outcast Ruth Connors, who sees Susie's ghostly spirit.

The Salmon family initially refuses to believe that Susie is dead, until a neighbor's dog finds Susie's elbow. The police talk to Harvey, finding him odd but not suspicious. Susie's father, Jack, gradually suspects Harvey. Jack's surviving daughter, Lindsey, eventually shares this sentiment. Jack takes an extended leave from work. Meanwhile, another of Susie's classmates, Ray Singh, who had a crush on Susie in school, develops a friendship with Ruth, drawn together by their connection with Susie.

Later, Detective Len Fenerman tells the Salmons that the police have exhausted all leads and are dropping the investigation. That night, Jack peers out of his den window and sees a flashlight in the cornfield. Believing Harvey is returning to destroy evidence, Jack runs out to confront him, armed with a baseball bat. The figure is not Harvey, but Clarissa, Susie's best friend who is dating Brian, one of Susie's classmates. As Susie watches in horror from heaven, Brian—who was going to meet Clarissa in the cornfield—nearly beats Jack to death, and Clarissa breaks Jack's knee, as they believed he was after them. While Jack recovers from knee replacement surgery, Susie's grieving mother, Abigail, begins an affair with the widowed Det. Fenerman.

Trying to help her father prove his suspicions, Lindsey sneaks into Harvey's house and finds a diagram of the underground den. She leaves when Harvey unexpectedly returns. The police do not arrest Lindsey for breaking and entering. Harvey flees from Norristown. Later, evidence is discovered that links Harvey to Susie's murder and those of several other girls. In heaven, Susie meets Harvey's other victims and sees into his traumatic childhood.

Abigail leaves Jack and eventually takes a job at a winery in California. Abigail's mother, Grandma Lynn, moves into the Salmons' home to care for Lindsey and Buckley (the younger brother). Eight years later, Lindsey and her boyfriend, Samuel Heckler, become engaged after finishing college. They find an old house in the woods, owned by a classmate's father, and decide to fix it up and live there. Sometime after the celebration, while arguing with his son Buckley, Jack suffers a heart attack. The emergency prompts Abigail to return from California, but the reunion is tempered by Buckley's lingering bitterness for her having abandoned the family for most of his childhood.

Meanwhile, Harvey returns to Norristown, which has become more developed. He explores his old neighborhood and notices the school is being expanded into the cornfield where he murdered Susie. He drives by the sinkhole where Susie's body rests and where Ruth and Ray are standing. Ruth senses the women Harvey has killed and is physically overcome. Susie, watching from heaven, is also overwhelmed with emotion. She feels that she and Ruth transcend their present existence; her spirit enters Ruth's body. Ray senses her and is stunned. The two have sex as Susie has longed to do after seeing her sister and Samuel's love. Afterward, Susie returns to heaven and Ruth to her earthly body.

Susie moves to a larger part of Heaven, but occasionally watches earthbound events. Lindsey and Samuel have a daughter they name Abigail Suzanne. While stalking a young woman in New Hampshire, Harvey is hit on the shoulder by an icicle and falls to his death down a snow-covered slope into the ravine below. At the end of the novel, a Norristown couple finds Susie's charm bracelet but don't realize its significance. Susie closes the story by wishing the reader "a long and happy life".

== Characters ==
- Susie Salmon, a 14-year-old girl who is raped and murdered in the first chapter. She narrates the novel from Heaven, witnessing the events on earth and experiencing hopes and longings for daily life.
- Jack Salmon, her father, works for an insurance agency in Chadds Ford, Pennsylvania. After her death, he is consumed with guilt for having failed to save his daughter.
- Abigail Salmon, Susie's mother, had dreams frustrated by her growing family responsibilities. After her daughter's death, she leaves the family and moves to California, not returning for years.
- Lindsey Salmon, Susie's younger sister by one year. She tries to help her father investigate Harvey.
- Buckley Salmon, Susie's younger brother by 10 years. His unplanned birth had forced Abigail to cancel her plans for a teaching career. He sometimes sees Susie while she watches him.
- Grandma Lynn, Abigail's mother, an eccentric alcoholic, comes to live with the Salmons when Jack asks her for help after Susie's death. After Abigail leaves, Lynn helps raise her grandchildren.
- George Harvey, the Salmons' neighbor who murders Susie. He is revealed as a serial killer of young girls. Susie refers to him in the novel as Mr. Harvey, as she had addressed him in life.
- Ruth Connors, a classmate whom Susie's spirit touches. Ruth becomes fascinated with Susie, despite having barely known her, and begins writing about seeing visions of the dead.
- Ray Singh, a boy from India, the first and only boy to kiss Susie, who becomes Ruth's friend. He is an initial suspect in Susie's death, but proves his alibi. Years after her death, Susie's spirit spends a brief time with him.
- Ruana Singh, Ray's mother, with whom Abigail Salmon sometimes smokes cigarettes.
- Samuel Heckler, Lindsey's boyfriend and later husband.
- Hal Heckler, Sam's older brother who runs a motorcycle repair shop.
- Len Fenerman, the police detective in charge of investigating Susie's death. His wife had committed suicide some time before the events of the novel. He has an affair with Abigail.
- Clarissa, Susie's best friend. Susie had admired her because of Clarissa's freedom to do things, such as smoke and wear platform shoes, which Susie could not.
- Nate, Buckley's best friend.
- Brian Nelson, Clarissa's boyfriend. He sees Jack Salmon holding a bat with a distraught-looking Clarissa nearby. He assumes Clarissa is Jack's victim, and severely beats Jack.
- Holly, Susie's best friend in heaven. It is implied she is Vietnamese American. She took her American name from the character Holly Golightly, played by Audrey Hepburn in Breakfast at Tiffany's.
- Franny, a woman who worked as a social worker. She becomes Susie and Holly's mentor in their Heaven.
- Mr. Dewitt, the boys' soccer coach at school. Mr. Dewitt encourages Lindsey, a successful athlete, to try out for his team.
- Mrs. Dewitt, Mr. Dewitt's wife, an English teacher at Susie's school. She teaches both Susie and Lindsey.
- Principal Caden, the principal of Susie and Lindsey's school.

== Reception ==
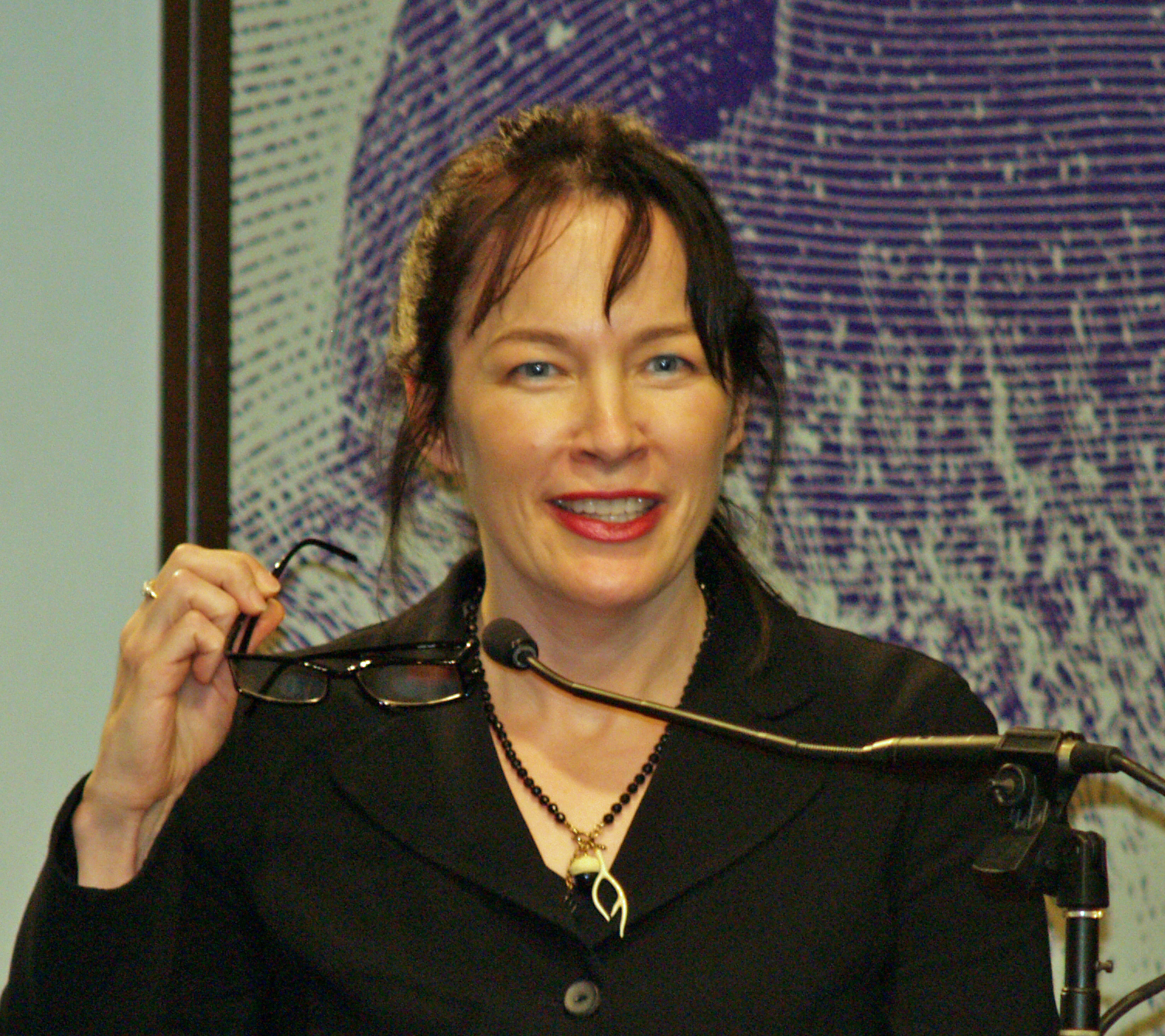
Alice Sebold in 2007

"This is a high-wire act for a first novelist, and Alice Sebold maintains almost perfect balance", wrote Katherine Bouton in The New York Times Book Review.

Ali Smith of The Guardian wrote that The Lovely Bones "is a determined reiteration of innocence, a teeth-gritted celebration of something not dismembered or shattered at all, but continuous: the notion of the American family unit, dysfunctional, yes, but pure and good nonetheless." The Observer's Philip Hensher considers that the novel was "very readable" but "ultimately it seems like a slick, overpoweringly saccharine and unfeeling exercise in sentiment and whimsy". Hensher notes too that "It's a very God-free heaven, with no suggestion that anyone has been judged, or found wanting".

Sebold has said that she did not intend the book to be religious, "but if people want to take things and interpret them, then I can't do anything about that. It is a book that has faith and hope and giant universal themes in it, but it's not meant to be, 'This is the way you should look at the afterlife'".

== Film adaptation ==
Director Peter Jackson secured the book's film rights. In a 2005 interview, he said the reader has "an experience when you read the book that is unlike any other. I don't want the tone or the mood to be different or lost in the film." In the same interview, regarding Susie's heaven, he said the movie version would endeavor to make it appear "somehow ethereal and emotional, but it can't be hokey". The film stars Saoirse Ronan as Susie Salmon, Mark Wahlberg as Jack Salmon, Stanley Tucci as George Harvey, Rachel Weisz as Abigail Salmon, Susan Sarandon as Susie's Grandmother Lynn, and Rose McIver as Lindsey Salmon.

The film opened to a limited release in three U.S. theaters on December 11, 2009, and received international and wide release on January 15, 2010. It was met with mixed reviews, but garnered an Academy Award nomination for Best Supporting Actor (Tucci), and other praise for his and Ronan's acting.

== Stage adaptation ==
A stage adaptation of the novel, adapted by Bryony Lavery and directed by Melly Still, made its world premiere at the Royal & Derngate, Northampton on 1 September 2018. It also toured to Everyman Theatre, Liverpool, Northern Stage, Birmingham Repertory Theatre and New Wolsey Theatre.
