= Alice Sebold =

American writer (born 1963)

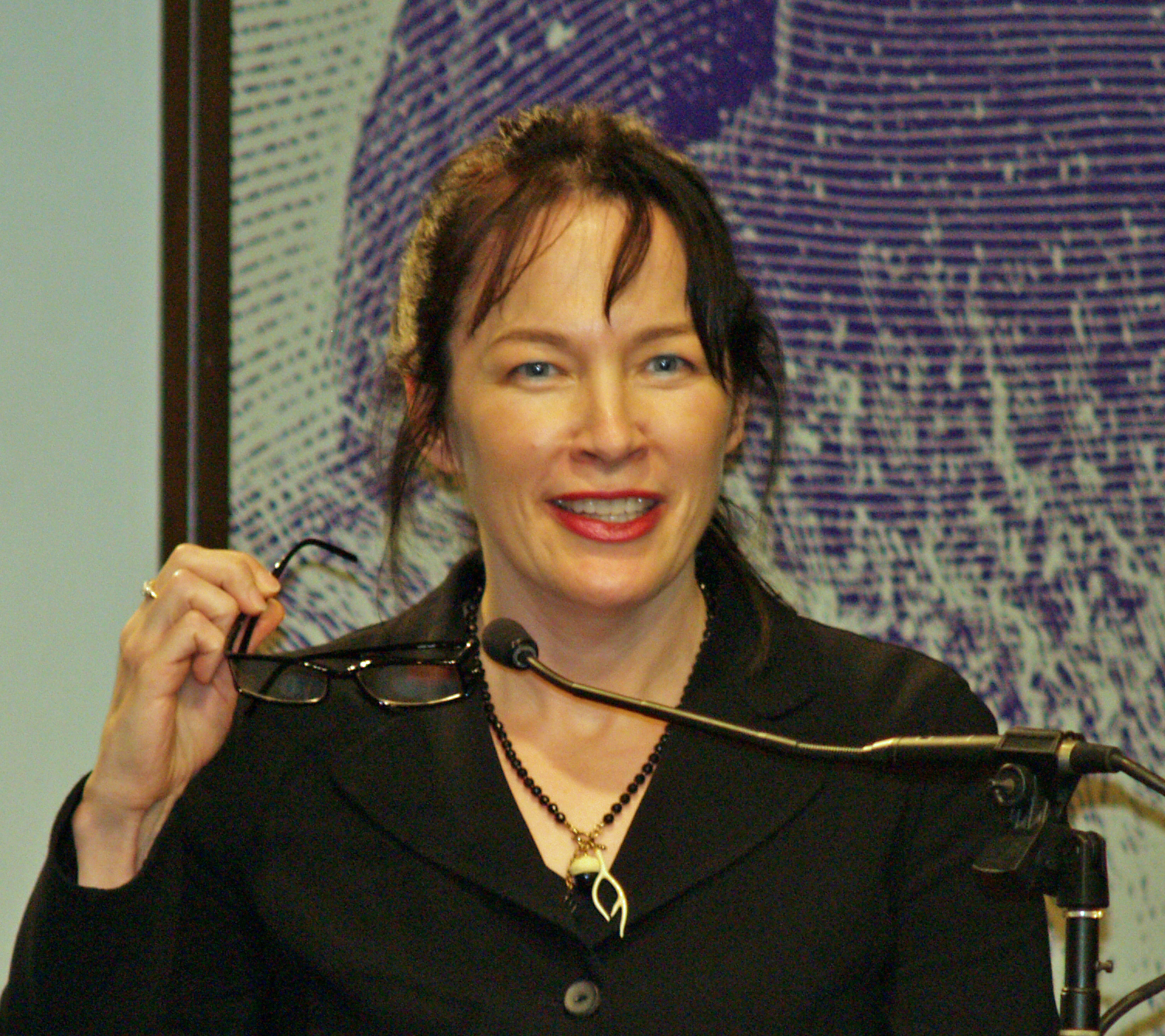
- Born: September 6, 1963 (age 63); Madison, Wisconsin, U.S.
- Education: Syracuse University (BA); University of Houston; University of California, Irvine (MFA)
- Occupation: Writer
- Spouse: Glen David Gold (m. 2001; div. 2012)
- Writing career
- Genres: Literary fiction, memoir
- Notable works: Lucky (1999); The Lovely Bones (2002); The Almost Moon (2007)

Alice Sebold (born September 6, 1963) is an American author. She is known for her novels The Lovely Bones and The Almost Moon, and a memoir, Lucky. The Lovely Bones was on The New York Times Best Seller list and was adapted into a film by the same name in 2009.

Her memoir, Lucky, sold over a million copies and describes her experience in her first year at Syracuse University, when she was raped. She falsely accused Anthony Broadwater of being the perpetrator. Broadwater spent 16 years in prison. He was exonerated in 2021, after a judge overturned the original conviction. Consequently, the publisher of Lucky announced that the book would no longer be distributed.

== Early life and education ==
Sebold was born in Madison, Wisconsin. She grew up in the Paoli suburb of Philadelphia, where her father taught Spanish at the University of Pennsylvania. While they were young, Sebold and her older sister, Mary, often had to take care of their mother, a journalist for a local paper, who suffered from panic attacks and drank heavily.

Sebold graduated from Great Valley High School in Malvern, Pennsylvania, in 1980. Sebold attended Syracuse University, where she earned her bachelor's degree. Among her professors was Tess Gallagher, who became one of Sebold's confidantes. Also among her professors were Raymond Carver, Tobias Wolff, and Hayden Carruth.

After graduating in 1984, she briefly attended the University of Houston in Texas, for graduate school, then moved to Manhattan for the next 10 years. She held several waitressing jobs while pursuing a writing career, but neither her poetry nor her attempts at writing a novel came to fruition.

Sebold left New York for Southern California, where she became a caretaker of an artists' colony, earning $386 a month and living in a cabin in the woods without electricity. She earned an MFA from the University of California, Irvine, in 1998.

== Rape and writing of memoir Lucky ==
In the early hours of May 8, 1981, while she was a freshman at Syracuse University, Sebold was assaulted and raped while walking home along a pathway that passed a tunnel to an amphitheatre near campus. She reported the crime to campus security and the police, who took her statement and investigated, but could not identify any suspects. Five months later, while walking down a street near the Syracuse campus, she encountered a man whom she mistakenly believed to be the rapist and contacted the police, saying she may have seen her attacker. Although she identified a different man in a police lineup, the police arrested Anthony Broadwater, and Sebold later identified Broadwater in court as the perpetrator. Broadwater ultimately served 16 years in prison, during which he maintained his innocence. Because he would not admit to the attack, he was denied parole five times.

=== Writing of Lucky ===
In 1996 or 1997, she began writing a novel about the rape and murder of an adolescent girl based upon this experience. The interim title was Monsters. She found herself struggling to finish it, and abandoned several other novels she had also started. Eventually, she realized she needed to write about the rape and its impact on her first.

Lucky was published in 1999, in which she described every aspect of the rape in graphic detail. She used the fictitious name "Gregory Madison" for the rapist. The title of her memoir stemmed from a conversation with a police officer who told her that another woman had been raped and murdered in the same location, and that Sebold was "lucky" because she hadn't been killed. Sebold wrote that the attack made her feel isolated from her family, and that for years afterwards, she experienced hypervigilance. She resigned from her night job, fearing danger in darkness. She was depressed, suffered from nightmares, drank heavily and snorted heroin for three years. Eventually, after reading Judith Lewis Herman's Trauma and Recovery, she realized she had developed post-traumatic stress disorder.

Initially, Lucky received positive reviews. After Sebold became successful with her 2002 novel, The Lovely Bones, interest in the memoir picked up and it went on to sell over one million copies.

=== Exoneration of Broadwater ===
Broadwater tried five times to have the conviction overturned, with at least as many groups of lawyers. When Timothy Mucciante began working as executive producer on a project to adapt Lucky into a film, he noticed discrepancies in the portion of her book describing the trial. He later told The New York Times: "I started having some doubts—not about the story that Alice told about her assault, which was tragic, but the second part of her book about the trial, which didn't hang together". He ultimately was fired from the project when he did not provide funding as he had originally agreed, and subsequently hired a private investigator to review the evidence against Broadwater.

In November 2021, Broadwater was exonerated by a New York Supreme Court justice, who determined there had been serious issues with the original conviction. The conviction had relied heavily on two pieces of evidence: Sebold's testimony and microscopic hair analysis, a forensic technique the United States Department of Justice later found to be unreliable.

At the police lineup, which included Broadwater, Sebold had identified a different person as her rapist. When police told her she had identified someone other than Broadwater, she said the two men looked "almost identical". Defense attorneys arguing for Broadwater's exoneration asserted that, after the lineup, the prosecutor lied to Sebold, telling her that the man she had identified and Broadwater were friends, and that they both came to the lineup to confuse her. They also stated that Sebold wrote in Lucky that the prosecutor coached her into changing her identification. In 2021, Broadwater's new attorneys argued that this influenced Sebold's testimony. Onondaga County District Attorney William J. Fitzpatrick, who joined the motion to overturn the conviction, argued that suspect identification is prone to error, particularly when the suspect is a different race from the victim; Sebold is white and Broadwater is black.

=== Aftermath ===
After his exoneration, Broadwater said: "I'm not bitter or have malice towards her." A week later, Sebold publicly apologized for her part in his conviction, saying she was struggling "with the role that I unwittingly played within a system that sent an innocent man to jail" and that Broadwater "became another young black man brutalized by our flawed legal system. I will forever be sorry for what was done to him." The manner of Sebold's apology drew criticism from some observers, who noted that it was largely made in the passive voice and did not acknowledge any personal responsibility for Broadwater's conviction.

The film adaptation of Lucky was canceled after losing its funding in mid-2021. Scribner, the publisher of Lucky, released a statement following Broadwater’s exoneration that distribution of all formats of the book would cease while Sebold and the publisher determined how to revise the work.

== The Lovely Bones ==
Once Lucky was finished, Sebold was able to complete her novel, Monsters. She sent the manuscript to her mentor, Wilton Barnhardt, who passed it to his agent. The work was eventually published as The Lovely Bones in 2002. It is the story of a teenage girl who is raped and murdered at age 14. In an interview with Publishers Weekly, Sebold said, "I was motivated to write about violence because I believe it's not unusual. I see it as just a part of life, and I think we get in trouble when we separate people who've experienced it from those who haven't. Though it's a horrible experience, it's not as if violence hasn't affected many of us."

A reviewer for the Houston Chronicle described the novel as "a disturbing story, full of horror and confusion and deep, bone-weary sadness. And yet it reflects a moving, passionate interest in and love for ordinary life at its most wonderful, and most awful, even at its most mundane." A reviewer for The New York Times wrote that Sebold had "the ability to capture both the ordinary and the extraordinary, the banal and the horrific, in lyrical, unsentimental prose". The Lovely Bones remained on The New York Times Best Seller list for over one year and by 2007, had sold over ten million copies worldwide. In The Guardian, Philip Hensher called it "a slick, overpoweringly saccharine and unfeeling exercise in sentiment and whimsy."

In 2009, it was adapted into a film of the same name by Peter Jackson, starring Saoirse Ronan, Susan Sarandon, Stanley Tucci, Mark Wahlberg, and Rachel Weisz.

== Other writing ==
Sebold's second novel, The Almost Moon, describes an art class model who murders her mother. It begins with the sentence: "When all is said and done, killing my mother came easily" and continues a key theme of her two other books in describing acts of violence. Sebold uses the killing as the starting point from which to examine dysfunctional relationships between parents and their daughters. The book received mixed reviews.

Sebold guest-edited The Best American Short Stories 2009.

== Awards and recognition ==
The Lovely Bones won the Bram Stoker Award for First Novel and the Heartland Prize in 2002, and the American Booksellers Association's Book of the Year Award for Adult Fiction in 2003. Sebold held MacDowell fellowships in 2000, 2005, and 2009. In 2016, Emerson College awarded Sebold with an honorary degree.

== Personal life ==
In 2001, Sebold married the novelist Glen David Gold; the couple divorced in 2012.

== Works ==
- Lucky (memoir, 1999), Scribner, ISBN 0-684-85782-0
- The Lovely Bones (novel, 2002), Little, Brown, ISBN 0-316-66634-3
- The Almost Moon (novel, 2007), Little, Brown, ISBN 0-316-67746-9
