= Baron Beaverbrook =

Barony in the Peerage of the United Kingdom

Barony of Beaverbrook
- Argent two barrulets wavy azure between in chief two maple leaves slipped and in base a thistle eradicated gules, a bordure sable charged with eight bezants
- Creation date: 2 January 1917
- Created by: King George V
- Peerage: Peerage of the United Kingdom
- First holder: Sir Max Aitken, 1st Baronet
- Present holder: Maxwell Aitken, 3rd Baron Beaverbrook
- Heir apparent: The Hon. Maxwell Francis Aitken
- Remainder to: 1st Baron's heirs male of the body lawfully begotten
- Seat: Denchworth Manor
- Former seat: Cherkley Court
- Motto: Res mihi non me rebus (Latin for 'Possessions for me, not me for possessions')

Baron Beaverbrook, of Beaverbrook in the Province of New Brunswick in the Dominion of Canada and of Cherkley in the County of Surrey, is a title in the Peerage of the United Kingdom. It was created in 1917 for the prominent media owner and politician Sir Max Aitken, 1st Baronet. He had already been created a baronet, of Cherkley in the County of Surrey, on 3 July 1916. When Aitken died, his son disclaimed the barony three days later, stating that "there shall only be one Lord Beaverbrook in my lifetime". Since 1985, the title has been held by the latter's son, the third baron.

The first Baron Beaverbrook's daughter, Janet Gladys Aitken, was the mother of John Edward Aitken Kidd. He is the father of Jemma Wellesley, Marchioness of Douro, and Jodie Kidd. Another member of the Aitken family is the Conservative politician Jonathan Aitken, who is the great-nephew of the first Baron Beaverbrook.

The family seat is Denchworth Manor, near Wantage in Oxfordshire. Replicas of the first baron's two favourite cats can be viewed in the public research room of the Provincial Archives of New Brunswick.

== Barons Beaverbrook (1917) ==
- William Maxwell "Max" Aitken, 1st Baron Beaverbrook (1879–1964)
- John William Maxwell "Max" Aitken, 2nd Baron Beaverbrook (1910–1985) (disclaimed 1964)
- Maxwell William Humphrey Aitken, 3rd Baron Beaverbrook (b. 1951)

The heir apparent is the present holder's son, The Hon. Maxwell Francis Aitken (b. 1977). The heir apparent's heir apparent is his son, Maxwell Alfonso Aitken (b. 2014).

== Line of succession ==
- William Maxwell Aitken, 1st Baron Beaverbrook (1879–1964)
  - Sir John William Maxwell Aitken, 2nd Baronet (1910–1985) (disclaimed 1964)
    - Maxwell William Humphrey Aitken, 3rd Baron Beaverbrook (born 1951)
      - (1) The Hon. Maxwell Francis Aitken (b. 1977)
        - (2) Maxwell Alfonso Aitken (b. 2014)
      - (3) The Hon. Alexander Rory Aitken (b. 1978)
  - Captain The Hon. Peter Rudyard Aitken (1912–1947)
    - (4) Timothy Maxwell Aitken (b. 1944)
      - (5) Theodore Maxwell Aitken (b. 1976)
      - (6) Charles Howard Filstead Aitken (b. 1979)
    - (7) Peter Michael Aitken (b. 1946)
      - (8) James Aitken
      - (9) Jason Aitken

== Arms ==
Coat of arms of Baron Beaverbrook
Coronet A Coronet of a Baron Crest Upon a drum proper a cock Gules membered combed and wattled Or Escutcheon Argent two barrulets wavy Azure between in chief two maple leaves and in base a thistle Gules, all within a bordure Sable bezanté Supporters Two beavers regardant each holding in the mouth a fish proper Motto RES MIHI NON ME REBUS (Latin for 'I suit life to myself, not myself to life')

== Bibliography ==
- Hesilrige, Arthur G. M. (1921). Debrett's Peerage and Titles of courtesy. London: London: Dean & son, limited. p. 104.
