= Maxwell Aitken, 3rd Baron Beaverbrook =

British politician

Air Vice-Marshal The Right Honourable The Lord Beaverbrook
- Born: 29 December 1951 (age 74)
- Education: Charterhouse School; Pembroke College, Cambridge; Royal College of Defence Studies
- Occupation: Politician
- Spouse: Susan Angela More O'Ferrall (m. 1974)
- Children: 4
- Parent(s): Sir Max Aitken, 2nd Baronet; Violet de Trafford
- Military career
- Allegiance: United Kingdom
- Branch: Royal Air Force
- Service years: 2004–2019
- Rank: Air Vice-Marshal
- Unit: Royal Auxiliary Air Force
- Commands: Royal Auxiliary Air Force

Maxwell William Humphrey Aitken, 3rd Baron Beaverbrook (born 29 December 1951) is a British peer, retired senior Royal Auxiliary Air Force officer and politician.

== Family ==
Maxwell Aitken is the grandson of The 1st Baron Beaverbrook and the only son of Sir Max Aitken, by his third marriage to Violet de Trafford. He was educated at Charterhouse and Pembroke College, Cambridge, and the Royal College of Defence Studies.

Aitken married Susan Angela More O'Ferrall, a member of an aristocratic Irish family and granddaughter of Sir Henry Mather-Jackson, 6th Baronet, on 19 July 1974. They have four children:

- Maxwell Francis Aitken (born 17 March 1977) married Inés Nieto Gómez-Valencia on 9 November 2007. They have two children.
  - Giuletta Ines Susanna Aitken (born 1 December 2011)
  - Maxwell Alfonso Aitken (born 16 December 2014)
- Alexander Rory Aitken (born 1978) married Alexandra Meredyth Anne Proby on 10 February 2007. They have three daughters.
- Charlotte Susanna Aitken (born 1982) married Charles Innes-Ker, Marquess of Bowmont and Cessford on 22 July 2011 and were divorced on 24 May 2012. Married Francesco Bellasi on 30 March 2019. They have a son.
- Sophia Violet Angela Aitken (born 1985) married Marchese Ugolino Bourbon di Petrella on 23 April 2016. They have a son, Tommaso (born 2018), and a daughter, Maddalena (born 2020).

== Political career ==
Lord Beaverbrook was a Lord in Waiting (1986–1988) and the Treasurer of the Conservative Party and the European Democrat Union (1990–1992).

== Military career ==
In 2004, Lord Beaverbrook was appointed Honorary Air Commodore of No. 4626 Squadron in the Royal Auxiliary Air Force (RAuxAF). In 2009 he was promoted to be Honorary Inspector General, RAuxAF, in the rank of air vice-marshal. In May 2016 he was appointed to the new post of Commandant General RAuxAF, with attendance at the Air Force Board. He retired in July 2019.

== Beaverbrook Foundation ==
He is Chairman of the Beaverbrook Foundation and has been a trustee since 1974. In 2003 The Beaverbrook Foundation claimed that 133 valuable paintings in the Beaverbrook Art Gallery given to the gallery by the first Lord Beaverbrook were not donated, but were instead on long-term loan from the Beaverbrook Foundation. The paintings were estimated to be worth approximately C$100 million. On 26 March 2007, the arbiter in the case, retired Supreme Court Justice Peter Cory, ruled that 85 paintings donated to the gallery before opening in the 1950s belong to the gallery, but that 48 paintings transferred after the opening belong to the Beaverbrook Foundation. The arbitration ruling was appealed and a settlement was reached in 2010. Another case between the Beaverbrook Canadian Foundation, chaired by Lord Beaverbrook's son, Max, and the Beaverbrook Art Gallery has also been settled.

== Other activity ==
He was a director of the British Racing Drivers Club from 2006 to 2008, and elected again from September 2015. He is currently a Vice President of the British Powerboat Racing Club. He won the European GT Championship in 1998 with Porsche, and competed in the FIA World GT Championship in 1999, and in the American Le Mans series in 2000. He won the Harmsworth Trophy (offshore powerboating) in 2004.

He was a member of the Council of the Homeopathic Trust 1987–1992; and remains a Vice President of Ambition UK, and is a Patron of London's Air Ambulance.

Political offices
Preceded by The Lord Brabazon of Tara	Lord-in-waiting; 1986–1988	Succeeded by The Lord Strathclyde
Peerage of the United Kingdom
Disclaimed Title last held by Max Aitken	Baron Beaverbrook; 1985–present	Incumbent; Heir apparent: Maxwell Aitken
Military offices
New title	Commandant General Royal Auxiliary Air Force; 2016–2019	Succeeded by Ranald Munro
