= Barrie Heath =

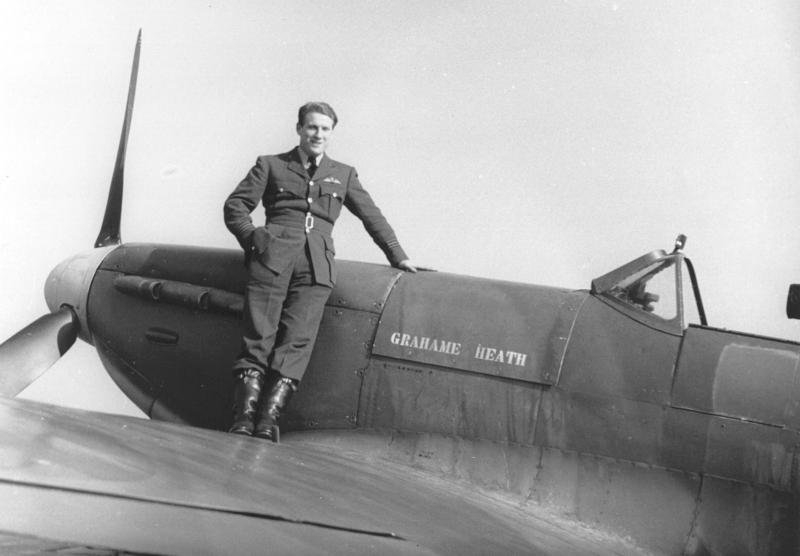
- Barrie Heath photographed on the wing of Spitfire IIa P7883 "Grahame Heath", which had been donated by his parents in memory of his older brother, a pilot in the Royal Flying Corps who was killed in the First World War
- Born: 11 September 1916; Kings Norton, Warwickshire, England
- Died: 22 February 1988 (aged 71); Buckinghamshire, England
- Military career
- Allegiance: United Kingdom
- Branch: Royal Air Force
- Service years: 1938–1946
- Rank: Wing commander
- Units: No. 611 Squadron RAF; No. 43 Squadron RAF
- Commands: No. 324 Wing RAF
- Conflicts: Second World War: Battle of Britain
- Awards: Knight Bachelor; Distinguished Flying Cross; Air Efficiency Award
- Other work: Triplex Safety Glass Ltd employee (1960); Pilkington Brothers director (1967); Chairman of GKN (1975)

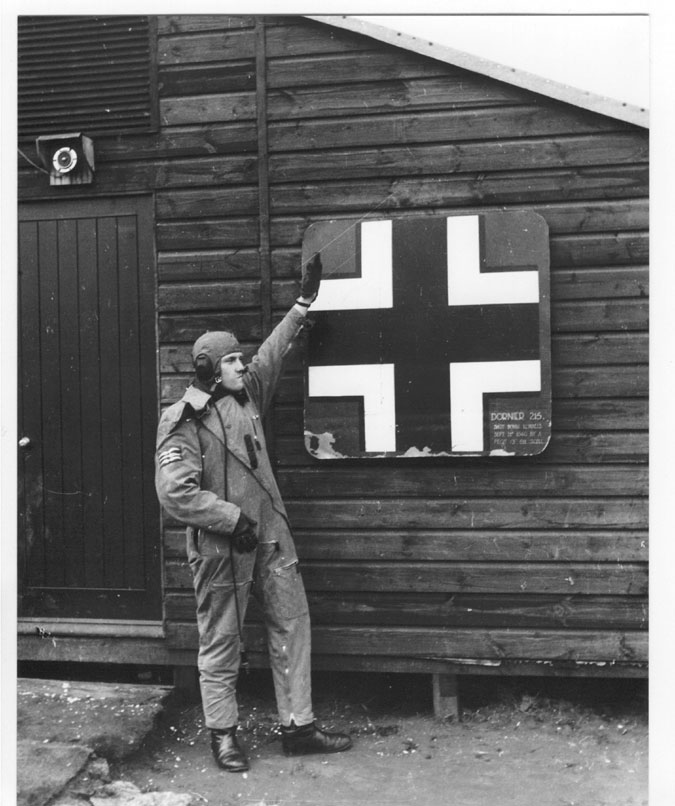
Barrie Heath poses in front of a section of a downed German aircraft, 1941.

Sir Barrie Heath, DFC, AE (11 September 1916 – 22 February 1988) was a Royal Air Force Spitfire pilot who fought in the Battle of Britain, and was awarded the Distinguished Flying Cross. Heath shot down four enemy aircraft (including two "probables") and damaged two others. After the Second World War he had a successful career in industry, rising to become chairman of the industrial conglomerate GKN. In 1978 he received a knighthood for services to export.

== Early life ==
Heath was born in Kings Norton, Warwickshire, on 11 September 1916. His older brother Grahame was a pilot in the Royal Flying Corps and was killed in action in the First World War.

== Second World War ==
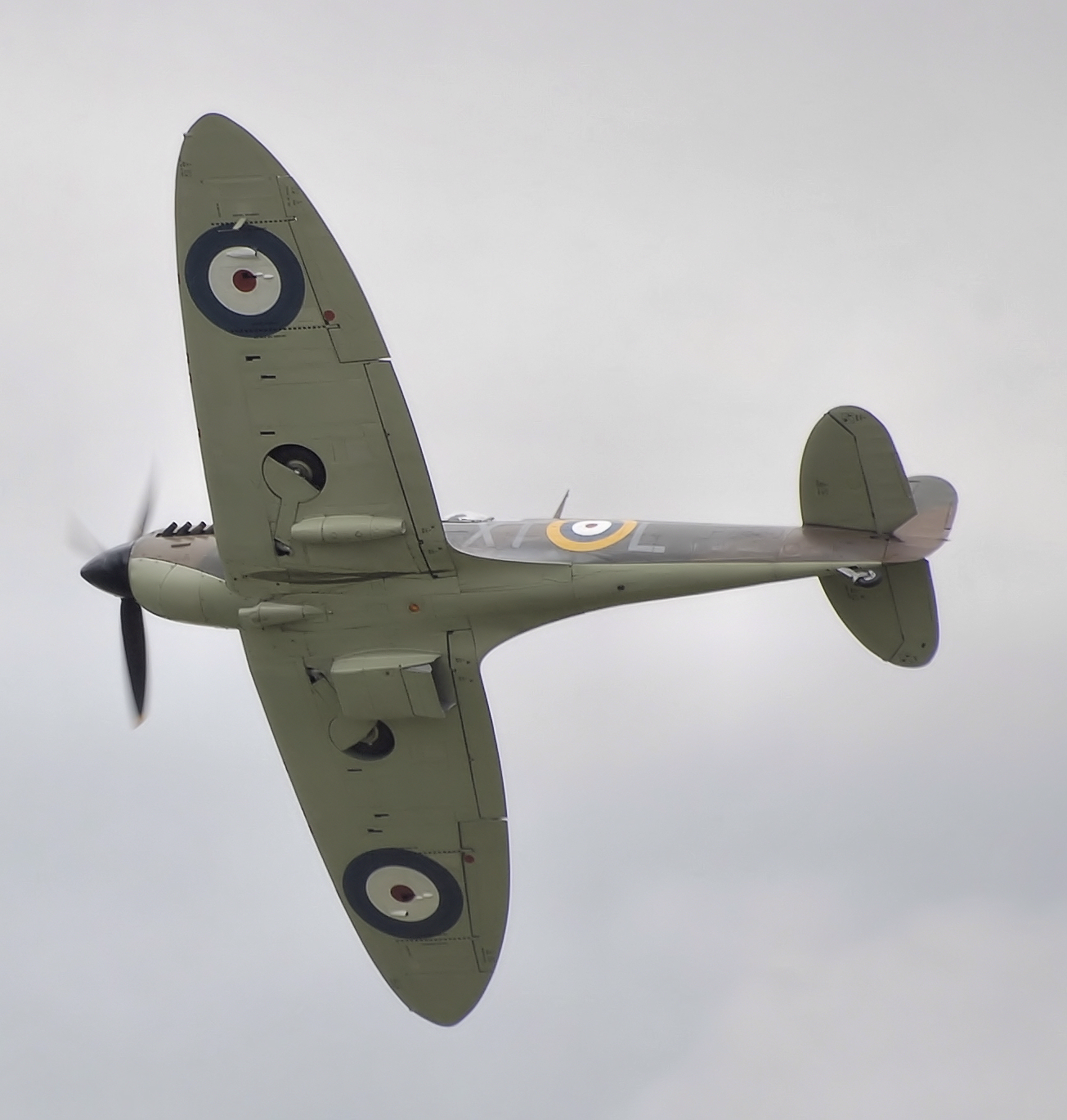
Spitfire Mk IIa P7350 of the BBMF is the only existing airworthy Spitfire that fought in the Battle of Britain.

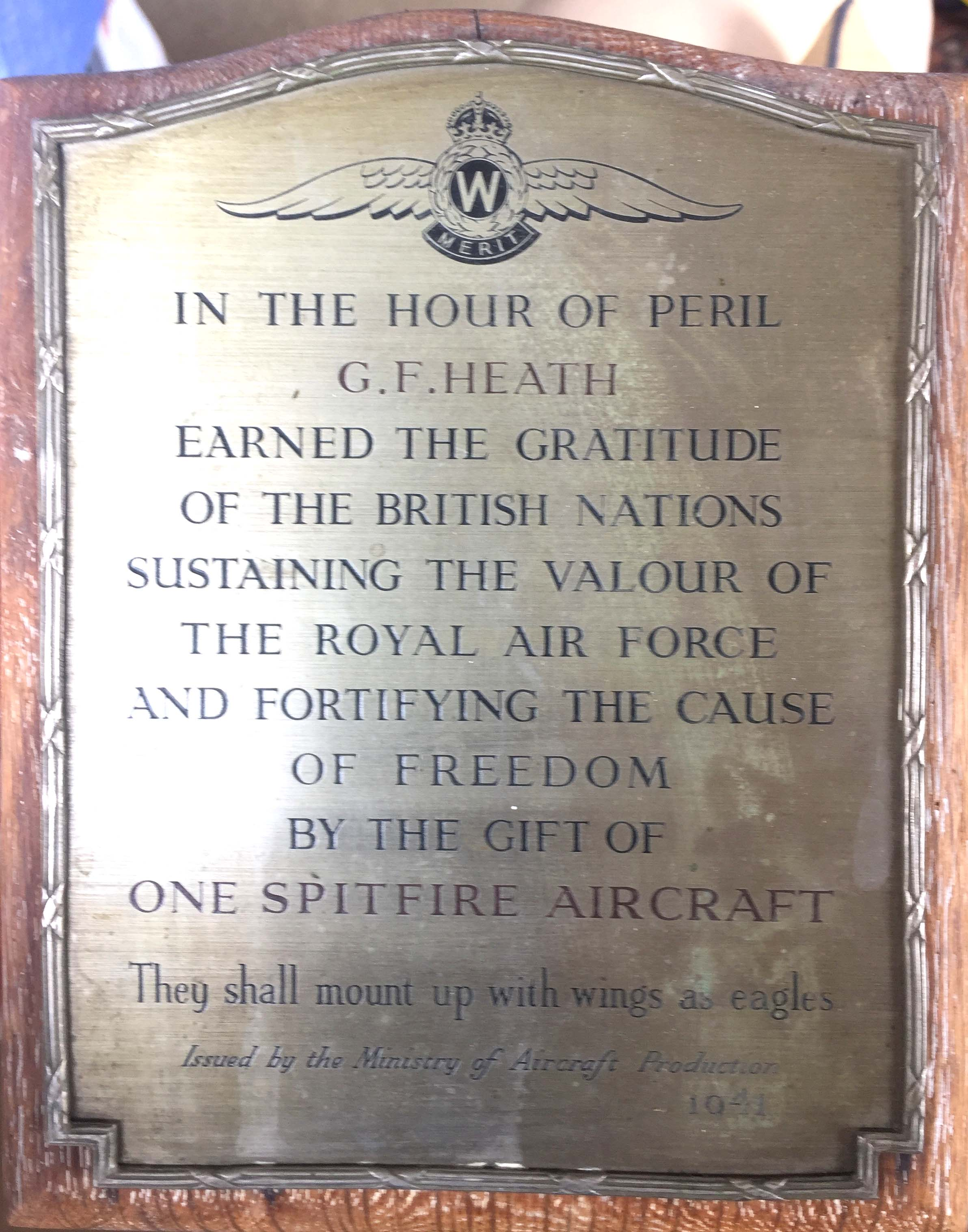
Plaque awarded to G.F. Heath to commemorate his "Presentation Spitfire"

Heath saw active service in 1940 with No. 611 Squadron RAF, flying in Spitfire IIa P7883 "Grahame Heath", which had been donated by his father G.F. Heath in memory of his son Grahame.

Such donations were not uncommon at the time; many patriotic individuals as well as towns and other organisations were encouraged to donate the cost of an airframe. The cost of a Spitfire was set by the government at £5,000, a very large sum at the time, although the real cost of manufacturing the aircraft was more than £10,000. By way of honouring the donation, the aircraft was permitted to bear the name of the donor himself, or any other name they chose. Approximately 1500 "presentation" Spitfires were donated during the course of the war, representing about 17% of total production.

Criticised by squadron commanding officer, Squadron Leader James Ellis McComb, for damaging his Spitfire on landing, Heath is said to have replied: "this is my Spit and I'll fly it any bloody way I like".

According to the official No. 611 Squadron RAF website, between June 1940 and February 1941, Heath shot down 4 enemy aircraft (including two "probables") and damaged two others. On 2 June 1940 he took off 07.05 hrs. for sortie over Dunkirk and his Spitfire Mk.Ia N3061 was hit by bullet in the mast.

He was made 'B' Flight Commander in November 1940. Early in 1941 he was posted to No. 64 Squadron, becoming CO in March 1941. He was rested in September 1941, transferring to Fighter Command HQ, and in late 1942 was Wing Commander, Tactics. In 1944, he became Wing Leader, 244 Wing in Italy, later commanding 324 Wing.

| Dates | Aircraft | Result |
|---|---|---|
| 2 June 1940 | Junkers Ju 87 | Destroyed |
| 21 August 1940 | Dornier Do 17 | Probable |
| 11 October 1940 | Dornier Do 17 | Probable |
| 21 December 1940 | Dornier Do 17 | Damaged |
| 29 December 1940 | Dornier Do 17 | Damaged |
| 5 February 1941 | Messerschmitt Bf 109 | Destroyed |

In 1944, as the tide of war turned in favour of the Allies, Heath (by now Wing Commander Heath) served with No. 43 Squadron RAF in France, known by its squadron insignia as the "fighting cocks", or "les coqs Anglais" as the local French population dubbed it. By now the squadron's main role was ground attack, strafing and occasionally dive bombing enemy targets.

On 9 September 1944, Heath, now commander of No. 324 Wing RAF and flying Spitfire IX MJ628, led a formation on the squadron's first sortie into German territory, strafing motor transport and railway communications.

== Postwar career ==
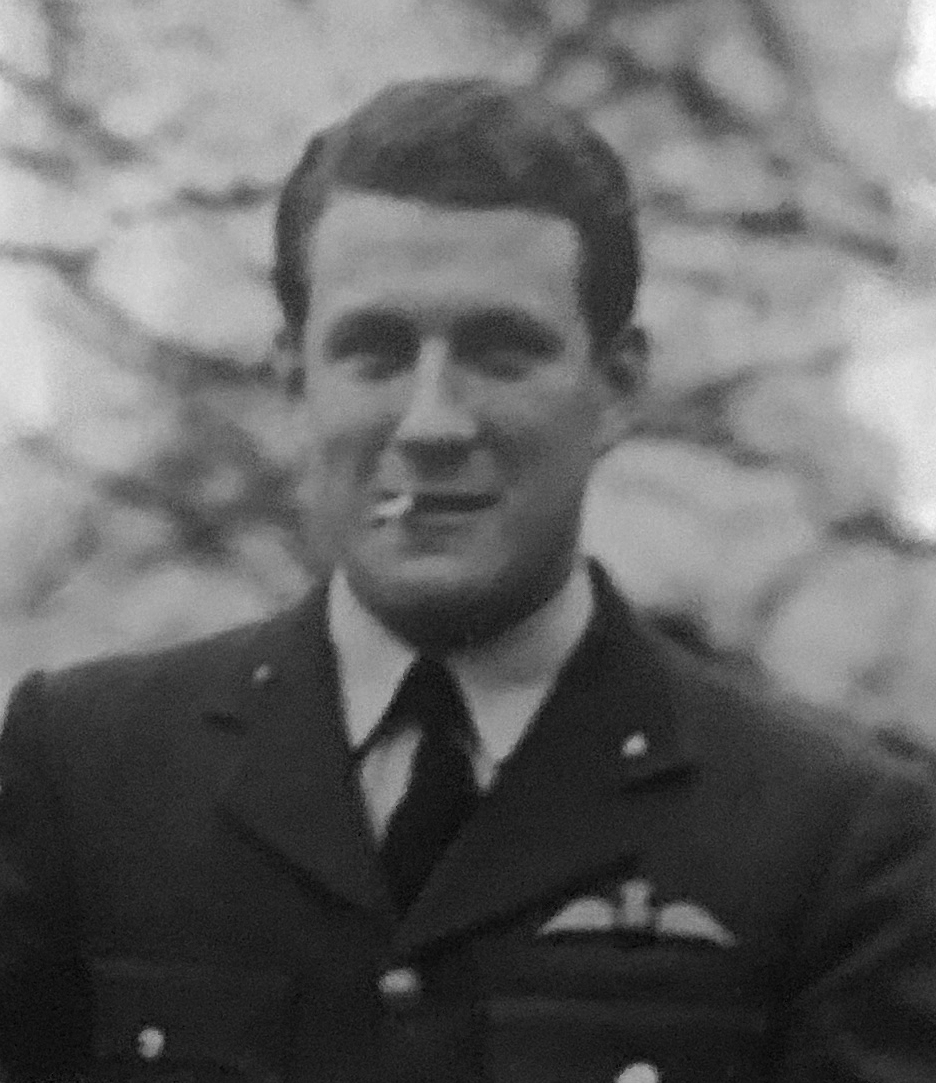
Barrie Heath in RAF Uniform, c. 1940

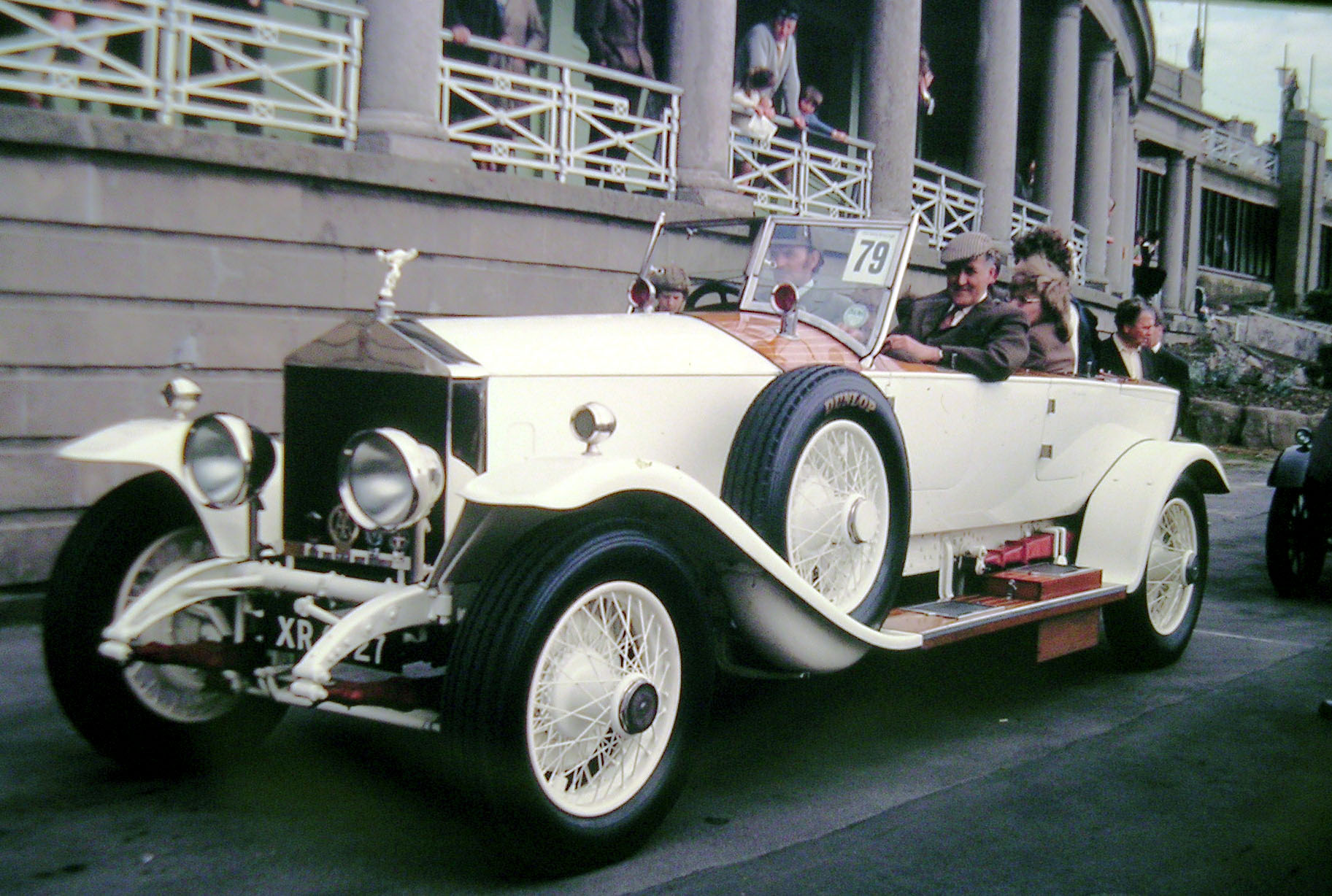
Vintage Rolls-Royce being driven by Barrie Heath

After the war, Heath pursued a successful career in manufacturing industry. In 1946 he left the RAF and was appointed to the board of Hobourn aero components, Coventry. In 1960 he joined Triplex Safety Glass Ltd as their managing director and, in 1967, joined the board of the parent company Pilkington Brothers. In 1975 he took over from Sir Raymond Brookes to become chairman of the industrial conglomerate GKN, and in 1978 he received a knighthood. Among the problems Heath had to contend with as chairman were hyperinflation, the oil crisis, and declining demand for steel and automotive parts.

In an article in Time magazine in May 1979 he was described as "one of Britain's most respected business leaders", and as having "advised the new Conservative government 'not to rush in and try to bring in laws to restrict the unions. Such a course of action would be the death knell for British industry'."

Tony Jeeves, a former colleague at GKN, described him as "a great boss, incredibly kind and generous but certainly did not suffer fools gladly ... people either loved or hated him". He retired from GKN in 1980.

Barrie Heath and his wife, Joan, lived at Penn, Buckinghamshire, where, after his death, Lady Heath moved to a smaller property, swapping homes with her friend and neighbour, cookery writer Dame Mary Berry.

Their son, Duncan, is a talent agent. Son Ian Heath (died 1996) was married to actress Vicki Hodge (daughter of Sir John Rowland Hodge, 2nd Baronet) from 1969 to 1980.

== Honours and awards ==
- 29 April 1941 – Acting Squadron Leader Barrie Heath (90818), Auxiliary Air Force, No. 611 Squadron is awarded the Distinguished Flying Cross for gallantry and devotion to duty in the execution of air operations.
- 3 June 1978 – Barrie Heath, DFC, AE, group chairman of Guest Keen and Nettlefolds Limited is awarded the Honour of Knighthood for services to export which was presented on 12 July 1978.

== Bibliography ==
- Saunders, Andy. (2003). No 43 Squadron (Aviation Elite Units) Osprey Publishing. ISBN 978-1-84176-439-9
