= Hodge baronets =

Baronetcy in the Baronetage of the United Kingdom

There have been two baronetcies created for persons with the surname Hodge, both in the Baronetage of the United Kingdom. One creation is extant as of 2010.

The Hodge, later Hermon-Hodge Baronetcy, of Accrington in the County of Lancaster, was created in the Baronetage of the United Kingdom on 24 July 1902. For more information on this creation, see Baron Wyfold.

The Hodge Baronetcy, of Chipstead in the County of Kent, was created in the Baronetage of the United Kingdom on 3 March 1921 for the shipbuilder Rowland Hodge. As of 2010 the title is held by his grandson, the third Baronet, who succeeded his father in 1995.

== Hodge, later Hermon-Hodge baronets of Accrington (1902) ==
- see Baron Wyfold

== Hodge baronets, of Chipstead (1921) ==
- Sir Rowland Frederic William Hodge, 1st Baronet (1859–1950)
- Sir John Rowland Hodge, 2nd Baronet (1913–1995). Hodge was married four times; his second wife Joan Wilson (1919–2005) was mother of three daughters, including Wendy Madeleine Hodge, second wife of John Kidd, and mother of Jemma Wellesley, Countess of Mornington, supermodel Jodie Kidd and polo player Jack Kidd. Another daughter was model Vicki Hodge (b. 1946), one-time girlfriend of both John Bindon and Prince Andrew, Duke of York. Their third daughter was model Sally Joan Hodge (b. 1943), mother of Anthony Joseph Hodge Clavien (b. 1977) and Alana Nicole Hodge Sindelar (b. 1983)
- Sir Andrew Rowland Hodge, 3rd Baronet (born 1968)

.
