= Lady Jeanne Campbell =

British socialite, actress, and journalist (1928–2007)

- Born: 10 December 1928
- Died: 4 June 2007 (aged 78); New York City, U.S.
- Occupations: Socialite, actress, foreign correspondent
- Spouses: Norman Mailer (m. 1962; div. 1963) John Sergeant Cram III (m. 1967; div. 1968)
- Children: Kate Mailer; Cusi Cram
- Parent(s): Ian Campbell, 11th Duke of Argyll; Janet Gladys Aitken
- Relatives: Max Aitken (grandfather)

Lady Jeanne Louise Campbell (10 December 1928 – 4 June 2007) was a British socialite and foreign correspondent who wrote for the Evening Standard in the 1950s and 1960s.

== Early life ==
Campbell was the daughter of Ian Douglas Campbell, 11th Duke of Argyll (1903–1973) and his first wife, the Hon. Janet Gladys Aitken (1908–1988), whose own father was Max Aitken, 1st Baron Beaverbrook. After their divorce in 1934, her father remarried three times, including to Margaret, Duchess of Argyll. Her father inherited the dukedom from his first cousin once removed, Niall Diarmid Campbell, 10th Duke of Argyll upon his death in 1949. Her mother remarried to the Hon. Drogo Montagu (1908–1940), the second son of George Montagu, 9th Earl of Sandwich, who died during World War II.

Through her mother, she was a granddaughter of the Canadian-born press baron Lord Beaverbrook, who was the owner of the Evening Standard. Through her father, she was the great-niece of Queen Victoria's daughter Louise, who married John Campbell, 9th Duke of Argyll, the fourth Governor General of Canada.

== Career ==
In the 1950s and 1960s, Campbell went to New York City, where she became a foreign correspondent for the Evening Standard, which was owned by her grandfather, Lord Beaverbrook. She covered John F. Kennedy's funeral in 1963, writing that Jackie "Kennedy has given the American people the one thing they have always lacked: majesty."

In January 1974, her half-brother, Ian Campbell, 12th Duke of Argyll, set up the Clan Campbell Society of the United States in New York City. She was appointed by him to serve as the Society's High Commissioner, which, essentially, was the personal representative of the head of the Campbell Clan in the United States.

Campbell, a friend of Tennessee Williams, was interested in acting, joined The Old Vic, and contributed to a production of "Gravediggers of 1971" at La MaMa, an Off-Off Broadway theater.

== Personal life ==
Campbell was twice married and known for her many lovers. Reportedly, she had affairs with Nikita Khrushchev, Fidel Castro, U.S. President John F. Kennedy, (Note: According to her daughter Cusi, these claims by James C. Humes are not accurate. Campbell never met Castro nor went to Havana; she interviewed Khrushchev, but there is no evidence that she had an intimate relationship with him; she had a relationship with Kennedy but it was reportedly "mostly a friendship.") Randolph Churchill, the son of Prime Minister Winston Churchill, Oswald Mosley, Ian Fleming, and Henry Luce II, the founder of Time magazine. She was first married to the American writer Norman Mailer (1923–2007) in 1962. He described her as "a remarkable girl, almost as interesting, complex and Machiavellian" as himself. Gore Vidal asked her why she became involved with Mailer and she replied "Because I never slept with a Jew before." Before their 1963 divorce, (Note: Lady Jeanne was represented by Whitman Knapp, the future Senior Judge of the United States District Court for the Southern District of New York, in her divorce proceedings.) they were the parents of Kate Mailer (b. 1962), who is a writer and an actress.

In 1967, she married her second husband, John Sergeant Cram III (1932–2007), a grandson of John Sergeant Cram and Anthony Joseph Drexel Jr., and great-grandson of railroad tycoon Jay Gould. They divorced in 1968 after becoming the parents of Cusi Cram (b. 1967), who is also an actress, a Herrick-prize-winning playwright, and an Emmy-nominated writer for the children's animated television program, Arthur. However, it was later revealed that Cusi was not Cram's daughter, but, in fact, the daughter of a Bolivian ambassador to the United Nations.

Campbell died on 4 June 2007. Her funeral was held at St. Joseph's Church on 6th Avenue in New York City.

== In popular culture ==
Campbell was the basis for "the bitch" in Norman Mailer's 1965 novel, An American Dream. The novel was controversial at the time for its portrayal and treatment of women, including the protagonist's murder of his estranged wife, a high society woman.

In the 2021 mini-series A Very British Scandal, she was played by Albertine Kotting McMillan.
