= No. 611 Squadron RAuxAF =

No. 611 (West Lancashire) Squadron RAuxAF
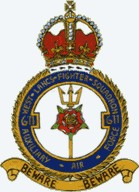
- No. 611 Squadron badge
- Active: 10 February 1936 – 15 August 1945; 10 May 1946 – 10 March 1957; 2013 – current
- Country: United Kingdom
- Branch: Royal Auxiliary Air Force
- Part of: Royal Auxiliary Air Force
- Base: RAF Woodvale
- Nickname: West Lancashire
- Motto: Beware Beware

Commanders
- Honorary Air Commodore: G.L. Pilkington
- Notable commanders: Roland "Bee" Beamont

Insignia
- Squadron Badge: In front of a trident, a rose The rose points to the County of Lancaster and the trident to Liverpool
- Squadron Codes: GZ (May 1939 – Sep 1939); FY (Sep 1939 – Aug 1945 and 1949 – Apr 1951); RAR (May 1946 – 1949)
- Post-1950 squadron roundel

No. 611 (West Lancashire) Squadron is a British Royal Air Force squadron. It was first formed in 1936 and was disbanded in 1957 after seeing combat as a fighter unit during the Second World War. It was reformed as a reserve squadron in 2013.

== History ==
=== Early years ===
The squadron was formed at RAF Hendon, Middlesex on 10 February 1936 as a day bomber unit. The squadron set up its permanent base at RAF Speke (now Liverpool John Lennon Airport) on 6 May and began recruiting personnel from Liverpool and the surrounding area. Its first Hawker Hart light bombers arrived in June, being replaced by Hawker Hinds from April 1938.

=== Wartime operations ===
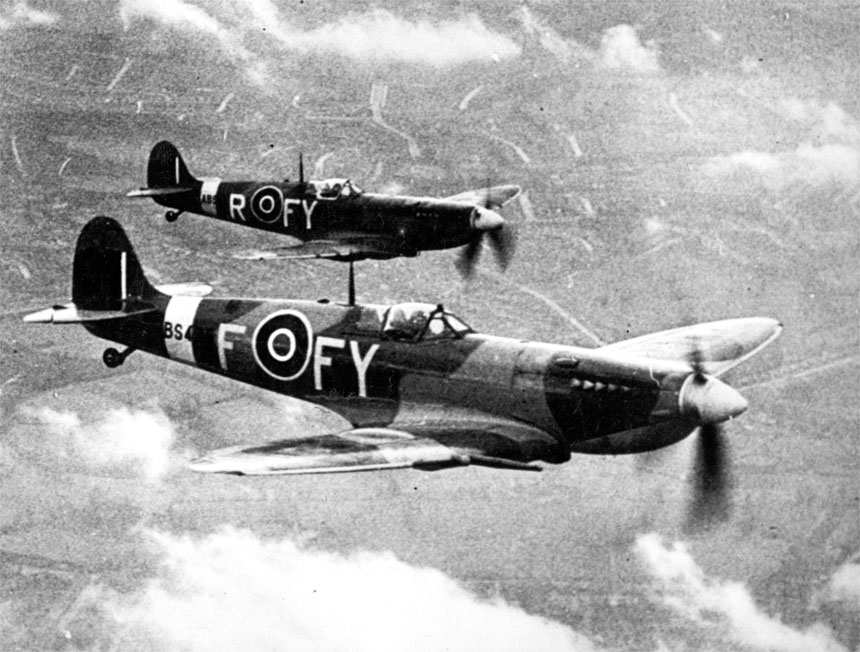
Two Spitfire Mk.IX of 611 Sqn. over Biggin Hill in 1943.

On 1 January 1939, the unit became a fighter squadron, receiving its first Supermarine Spitfire Mk.I's in May. The squadron left for RAF Duxford on 13 August, as part of the Fighter Command's No. 12 Group, After a period of defensive duties on the east coast, No. 611 became fully operational from its RAF Digby base in Lincolnshire in May 1940, firstly over Dunkirk and then taking part in the Battle of Britain campaign with the Duxford Wing, 12 Group's 'Big Wing' formation. The squadron commenced offensive sweeps over occupied northern France in January 1941, based at RAF Hornchurch, moving to RAF Drem in Scotland for recuperation in November 1941. The unit moved south again in June 1942 to RAF Kenley for deployment on shipping reconnaissance, escort and defensive missions. For Operation Overlord (the Allied invasion of Normandy) it was equipped with the Spitfire V LF as part of Air Defence of Great Britain, though under the operational control of RAF Second Tactical Air Force. No. 611 provided covering patrols for the invasion from its base at RAF Deanland. The squadron then moved to south-west England for a short period.

Long-range escort missions began to be flown from RAF Bradwell Bay, Essex, from late August 1944, until No. 611 moved to RAF Skeabrae in Orkney on 3 October. After converting to Merlin powered North American Mustang Mk.IV's the squadron again moved south, this time to RAF Hawkinge in Kent and resumed escort duties for the rest of the war. The squadron disbanded as an RAF squadron on 15 August 1945 at RAF Peterhead.

=== Postwar operations ===
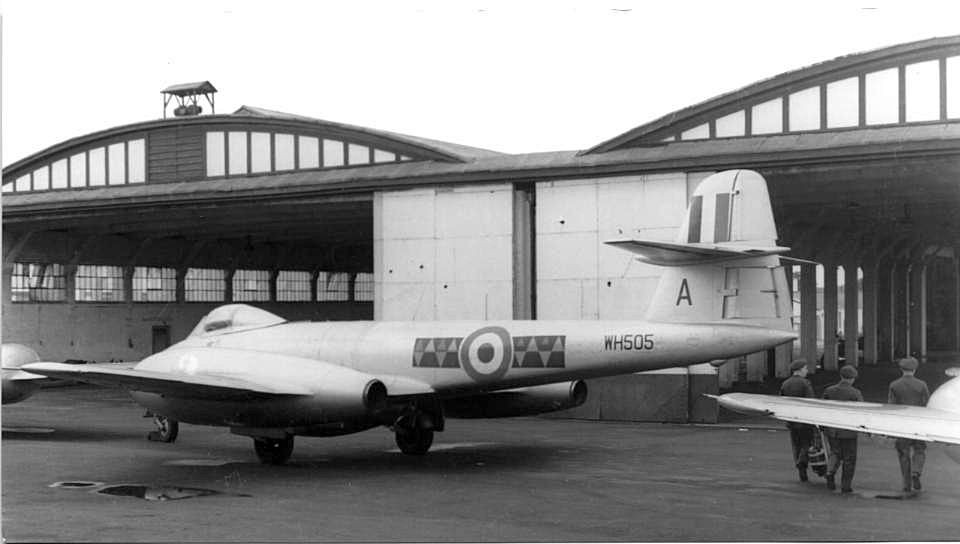
No. 611 Squadron Meteor F.8 WH505 'A' outside the Belfast Truss hangars at RAF Hooton Park in September 1952

The squadron reformed again at Liverpool's Speke airport on 10 May 1946 as a fighter squadron within the Royal Auxiliary Air Force. Because of growing airliner movements at Speke, the unit moved to RAF Woodvale near Southport on 22 July 1946 equipped with Spitfire F.14's and from June 1948 with the higher performance Spitfire F.22. Gloster Meteor F.4 jet fighters were received in May 1951, these requiring a move to the longer runways at RAF Hooton Park on the Wirral on 9 July. Re-equipment with updated Meteor F.8's came in December 1951 and these were flown from Hooton Park until the squadron disbanded on 10 March 1957, together with all other RAuxAF flying units.

611 Squadron was reformed at RAF Woodvale during 2013 in line with the expansion of the Royal Auxiliary Air Force recommended by the Future Reserves 2020 (FR20) Commission and endorsed by the Air Force Board Standing Committee. The commission was set up by the Prime Minister in 2010 to examine the shape and role of the Reserve Forces as part of the Strategic Defence and Security Review. The role of the squadron is to provide trained personnel to other RAF units.

== Notable Pilots ==
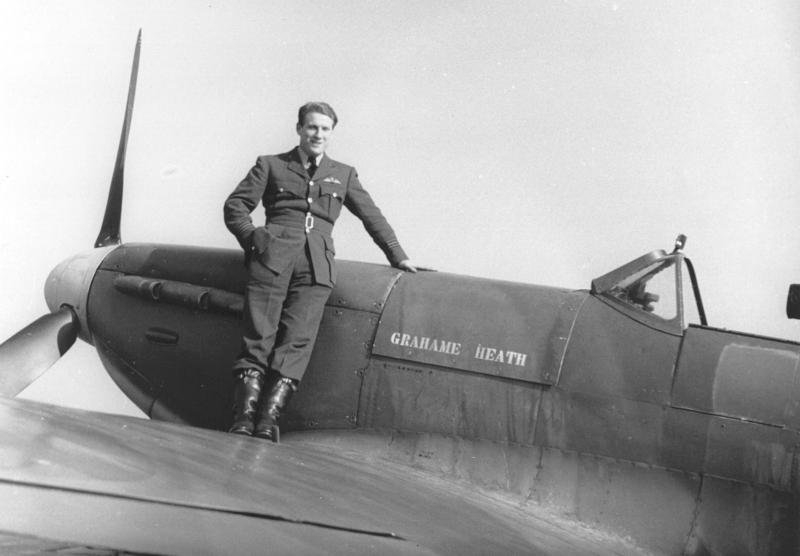
Flight Lieutenant Barrie Heath of 611 Squadron, photographed in 1940 on the wing of Spitfire IIa P7883 "Grahame Heath", named after his brother.

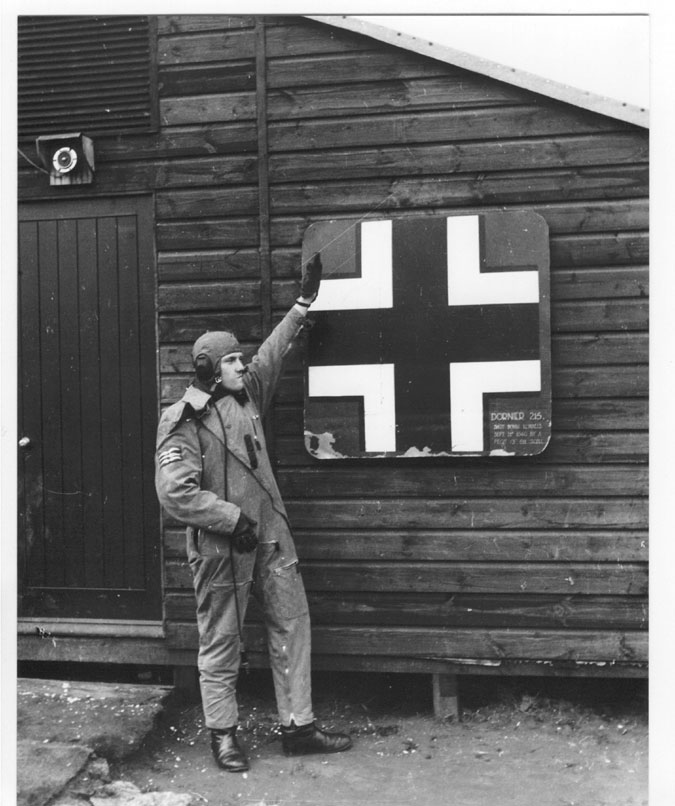
Barrie Heath with a piece of a Dornier Do 215.

- Eric Lock. July – November 1941 Top scoring British born pilot during the Battle of Britain and 26 confirmed victories during just six months of flying time.
- Barrie Heath. Heath shot down four German aircraft between 1940 and 1941. After the war he went on to become the chairman of the engineering giant GKN.
- Roland "Bee" Beamont. Famous test pilot.

== Aircraft operated ==
Aircraft operated by no. 611 Squadron RAF, data from
From	To	Aircraft	Version
June 1936	April 1938	Hawker Hart	
April 1938	June 1939	Hawker Hind	
May 1939	September 1940	Supermarine Spitfire	Mk.I
Aug 1940	October 1940	Supermarine Spitfire	Mk.IIa
October 1940	March 1941	Supermarine Spitfire	Mk.I
February 1941	May 1941	Supermarine Spitfire	Mk.IIa
May 1941	July 1941	Supermarine Spitfire	Mk.Va
June 1941	November 1941	Supermarine Spitfire	Mk.Vb
November 1941	February 1942	Supermarine Spitfire	Mks.IIa, IIb
January 1942	July 1942	Supermarine Spitfire	Mk.Vb
July 1942	July 1943	Supermarine Spitfire	Mk.IX
July 1943	July 1944	Supermarine Spitfire	LF.Mk.Vb
July 1944	March 1945	Supermarine Spitfire	Mk.IX
December 1944	December 1944	Supermarine Spitfire	Mk.VII
March 1945	August 1945	North American Mustang	Mk.IV
November 1946	August 1949	Supermarine Spitfire	FR.14
February 1949	November 1951	Supermarine Spitfire	F.22
May 1951	April 1952	Gloster Meteor	F.4
March 1952	February 1957	Gloster Meteor	F.8

== Squadron bases ==
Bases and airfields used by no. 611 Squadron RAF, data from
From	To	Base
10 February 1936	6 May 1936	RAF Hendon, Middlesex
6 May 1936	13 August 1936	RAF Speke, Lancashire
13 August 1936	10 October 1939	RAF Duxford, Cambridgeshire
10 October 1939	14 December 1940	RAF Digby, Lincolnshire
14 December 1940	27 January 1941	RAF Rochford, Essex
27 January 1941	20 May 1941	RAF Hornchurch, Essex
20 May 1941	16 June 1941	RAF Rochford, Essex
16 June 1941	13 November 1941	RAF Hornchurch, Essex
13 November 1941	3 June 1942	RAF Drem, East Lothian, Scotland
3 June 1942	13 July 1942	RAF Kenley, Surrey
13 July 1942	20 July 1942	RAF Martlesham Heath, Suffolk
20 July 1942	27 July 1942	RAF Redhill, Surrey
27 July 1942	1 August 1942	RAF Ipswich, Suffolk
1 August 1942	23 September 1942	RAF Redhill, Surrey
23 September 1942	1 July 1943	RAF Biggin Hill, Kent
1 July 1943	31 July 1943	RAF Matlaske, Norfolk
31 July 1943	4 August 1943	RAF Ludham, Norfolk
4 August 1943	6 September 1943	RAF Coltishall, Norfolk
6 September 1943	13 September 1943	RAF Southend, Essex
13 September 1943	8 February 1944	RAF Coltishall, Norfolk
8 February 1944	19 February 1944	RAF Ayr, Ayrshire, Scotland
19 February 1944	29 February 1944	RAF Coltishall, Norfolk
29 February 1944	23 June 1944	RAF Deanland, Sussex
23 June 1944	3 July 1944	RAF Harrowbeer, Devon
3 July 1944	17 July 1944	RAF Predannack, Cornwall
17 July 1944	30 August 1944	RAF Bolt Head, Devon
30 August 1944	3 October 1944	RAF Bradwell Bay, Essex
3 October 1944	31 December 1944	RAF Skeabrae, Orkney, Scotland
31 December 1944	3 May 1945	RAF Hawkinge, Kent
3 May 1945	7 May 1945	RAF Hunsdon, Hertfordshire
7 May 1945	15 August 1945	RAF Peterhead, Aberdeenshire, Scotland
10 May 1946	26 June 1946	RAF Speke, Lancashire
26 June 1946	22 July 1946	RAF Hooton Park, Cheshire
22 July 1946	9 July 1951	RAF Woodvale, Lancashire
9 July 1951	10 March 1957	RAF Hooton Park, Cheshire
2013	present	RAF Woodvale, Merseyside

== Commanding officers ==
Officers commanding no. 611 Squadron RAF, data from
From	To	Name
8 February 1939	4 September 1939	S/Ldr. G.L. Pilkington
4 September 1939	19 October 1940	S/Ldr. J.E. McComb, DFC
19 October 1940	18 May 1941	S/Ldr. E.R. Bitmead, DFC
18 May 1941	28 June 1941	S/Ldr. F.S. Stapleton, DFC
28 June 1941	17 November 1941	S/Ldr. E.H. Thomas, DFC
17 November 1941	12 September 1942	S/Ldr. D.H. Watkins, DFC
12 September 1942	17 February 1943	S/Ldr. H.T. Armstrong, DFC
17 February 1943	22 April 1943	S/Ldr. C. 'Wag' Haw, DFM, Order of Lenin
22 April 1943	26 August 1943	S/Ldr. E.F.J. Charles, DFC
26 August 1943	26 August 1944	S/Ldr. W.A. Douglas, DFC
26 August 1944	17 January 1945	S/Ldr. P.R. McGregor, CdG
17 January 1945	13 July 1945	S/Ldr. D.H. Seaton, DFC
13 July 1945	15 August 1945	S/Ldr. P.C.P. Farnes, DFM
10 May 1946	31 August 1948	S/Ldr. W.J. Leather, DFC
31 August 1948	6 November 1951	S/Ldr. R.P. Beamont, DSO, DFC
6 November 1951	May 1952	S/Ldr. H.R.P. Pertwee, DFC
May 1952	May 1952	S/Ldr. D.P. Sampson, DFC
May 1952	15 January 1954	S/Ldr. S.G. Nunn, DFC
15 January 1954	1 June 1956	S/Ldr. S. Kirtley
1 June 1956	10 March 1957	S.Ldr. S. Walker

== See also ==
- List of Royal Air Force aircraft squadrons
- List of Royal Air Force stations
- List of former Royal Air Force stations
