= Cherkley Court =

Mansion and estate in Leatherhead, Surrey, England

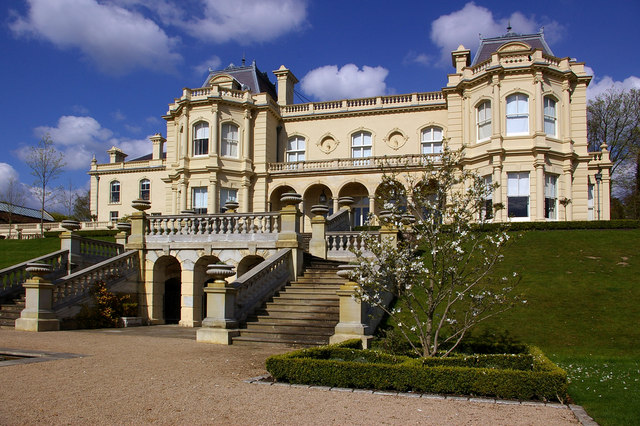
- Cherkley Court

- Location within Surrey
- 51°16′36″N 0°18′45″W
- Location: Leatherhead, Surrey
- OS grid reference: TQ 17816 54449

History
- Built: 1866-70

Site notes
- Architectural style: Neo-classical
- Owner: Longshot Cherkley Court Limited

Listed Building – Grade II
- Official name: Cherkley Court, with attached garden walls
- Designated: 24 August 1990
- Reference no.: 1028629

Cherkley Court, at the extreme southeast of Leatherhead, Surrey, in England, is a late Victorian neo-classical mansion and estate of 370 acres (1.5 km^{2}), once the home of Canadian-born press baron Lord Beaverbrook. The main house is listed Grade II on the National Heritage List for England.

== History ==
The house was built in 1866–70 for Birmingham exporter of metal goods Abraham Dixon (1815–1907) and rebuilt for him in 1893 after a fire, being lived in by his wife until her death in 1909. Cherkley Court was acquired in 1910 by Lord Beaverbrook, politician and owner of the Express Newspapers group, and he lived there for the next fifty years. During Beaverbrook's time, the house attracted many famous weekend guests including Winston Churchill, Bonar Law, Rebecca West, H. G. Wells, Harold Macmillan and Rudyard Kipling.

Beaverbrook passed the house on to his son Max some years before his death in 1964. After the death of Beaverbrook's second wife in 1994, the house became the property of the Beaverbrook Foundation, a charitable foundation set up by Lord Beaverbrook. Lord Beaverbrooks's daughter, Janet Gladys Aitken, served as a trustee of the foundation.

=== Later use ===
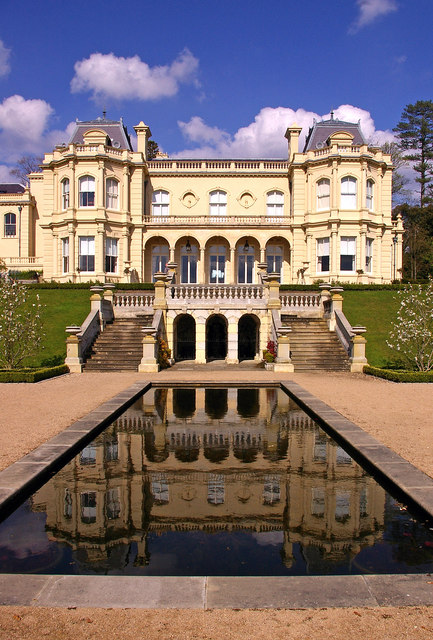
Cherkley Court

By 2002 Cherkley Court had fallen into disrepair but over seven years the Beaverbrook Foundation restored the property, using the architectural design of Christopher Smallwood, with the intention of opening it to the public in the same way as the great houses owned by the National Trust.

On 1 April 2007 it opened its 16 acres (65,000 m^{2}) of formal gardens and walks to paying visitors. As well as grand terraces, garden pavilions, a stone grotto and an Italianate garden there are wild flower meadows, a walnut grove and woodland walks.

However, in December 2009 it was announced that the house would no longer be open to the public from 2010, the Foundation having decided that it could not be profitable. In September 2010 the house and estate were put on the market at £20 million and purchased by a company called Longshot Cherkley Court, whose plans to turn the main house into a hotel and part of the estate into a golf course were being opposed by the Campaign to Protect Rural England (CPRE) from before the purchase was completed.

In April 2012, the local planning committee considered the proposals in detail and concluded that the opportunity to safeguard the historic building and protect the integrity of the estate, together with the employment prospects that the hotel, spa, golf course and woodland management would provide, outweighed such opposition, and instructed its planning officers to negotiate conditions with the new owners.

In September 2012, planning permission was granted to Longshot Cherkley Court to create a hotel including a health club and spa, plus an 18-hole golf course. This decision met with strong opposition from some and in August 2013 campaigners, including the CPRE, the Surrey Green Party and the Leatherhead Residents' Association, won a High Court appeal to overturn that decision, on the basis that the project would have an adverse effect on a landscape and area of outstanding natural beauty, and that Surrey did not need another golf course, having 141 already. The CPRE said it expected the developer to repair damage caused by work already started.

However, in May 2014, the Court of Appeal reversed the High Court decision, reinstating planning permission to Longshot. In October 2014, a request for a second judicial review, by The Cherkley Campaign, now leading opposition to the development, was rejected by a High Court judge. The group vowed to pursue further legal action to prevent the development of the golf course going ahead, but this proved impossible.

The new golf course opened in September 2016, with a "no day tickets or guest players" policy. Cherkley Court itself reopened in 2017 as the "Beaverbrook", a 5-star hotel and private leisure estate and the golf course club house finally opened in 2018. The club house was significantly damaged by a fire in March 2022.

== Features ==
=== Garden and grounds ===
The formal garden of the house is dwarfed by its hilltop woods, which reach the borders of Mickleham and Headley. Paths into the widest part of North Downs to the east adjoin, and the North Downs Way is fairly close.

The yews trees around the house were formerly famous, with a notable closed-canopy yew wood in the little valley immediately to the south of the house. Some of the trees were ancient. However, major storm damage began in the late 19th century and continued until the great storms of 1987 and 1990 cause massive destruction. Some scattered trees survive, in the valley mentioned and along the back driveway towards Mickleham.

The garden has three, separately listed, original features:

- Garden pool, or pond, long and in two terraced parts.
- A lower terrace with a balustrade wall parapet
- Wide terrace steps with loggia (half-open façade gallery)

=== Building ===
The building is of eclectic style with classical features, notably Tuscan columns. It is made of mostly stuccoed brick, with some uniformly cut stone blocks (ashlar), and slate roofs. It has semi-hexagonal protruding side wings, an irregular plan with a large service block attached at the north-east corner and a flat-roofed pavilion at the south-east corner.

== Location ==
Cherkley Court is off the A24 (where it forms the Leatherhead bypass) and its main drive begins near the Beaverbrook roundabout (grid reference TQ178544: Landranger Sheet 187, or Explorer 146). The back drive begins north of the William IV pub in Mickleham, but is not used for guests or the golf course.
