= Triplex Safety Glass =

Brand of toughened glass

Triplex Safety Glass Company Limited
- Company type: Subsidiary
- Industry: Automotive, Aerospace
- Founded: 9 September 1929
- Founder: Reginald Delpech
- Defunct: 24 September 2019
- Fate: Dissolved
- Headquarters: Eccleston, St Helens, United Kingdom
- Products: Laminated glass Toughened glass
- Number of employees: 1700 (1980s)
- Parent: Pilkington

Triplex Safety Glass was a British brand of toughened glass and laminated glass. Their marque is often seen on vehicle and aircraft windscreens.

== History ==
The Triplex Safety Glass Company Ltd was founded in 1912 by Kent-born Reginald Delpech (30 March 1881 - 29 May 1935). The company was established in 1912 to produce laminated windscreens in the UK, under a licence from French Société du Verre Triplex established by French chemist Édouard Bénédictus (1878–1930) who invented laminated glass. Triplex glass was reportedly first applied to automobiles during World War I.

On 9 September 1929 Triplex formed a joint venture company with Pilkington in St Helens. The company is now part of Pilkington Automotive.

In the 1960s Triplex bought its main competitor British Indestructo Glass, giving it a monopoly in British laminated glass production.

In the 1980s, around 1,000 people worked at the Triplex site in St Helens and about 700 at the site in Kings Norton.

Pilkington retired the Triplex brand in August 1993. The company was formally dissolved in September 2019.

=== Key people ===
- Sir Graham Cunningham, Chairman
- Alan Brooke, 1st Viscount Alanbrooke, Chairman, 1954–1956
- Derek Cook, Chairman, 1984–1985
- Sir Barrie Heath DFC, Managing Director, 1960–1968
- Kenneth Horne, sales director

== Structure ==
The company was headquartered at Eccleston, St Helens, at a factory built in 1928. It had its main plant at Kings Norton in the West Midlands.

The St Helens factory now manufactures under the GKN (Aerospace Transparency Systems) brand. Aerospace glass continues to be made at the site. It is believed that the automotive building fell out of use with the collapse of MG Rover in 2005 (when Pilkington downsized operations), although closure quite possibly predated this.

The Eccleston Site has since been demolished and a new housing estate built on the land.

== Products ==
Triplex made laminated and toughened windscreens and windows for the automotive, rail, marine and aerospace sectors. Particularly widespread is the use of so-called "triplex" adhesives, which result from the bonding of two or more glasses – single or safety – usually via polyvinylbutyric (PVB) membranes. The glazing is welded by heating and later pressing.

Triplex glasses exhibit the maximum impact resistance. This glazing system is distinguished for the optimal use of safety in use since, if it breaks, the glass pieces are held in place by means of the intermediate membranes, preventing serious injury.
