= A Matter of Degrees =

- Theatrical release poster
- Directed by: W.T. Morgan
- Screenplay by: Randall Poster; Jack Mason; W.T. Morgan
- Produced by: Roy Kissin; Randall Poster
- Starring: Arye Gross; Judith Hoag; Tom Sizemore; John Doe
- Cinematography: Paul Ryan
- Edited by: Curtiss Clayton
- Production companies: Backbeat Productions; Fox Lorber Features
- Distributed by: 20th Century Fox
- Release dates: January 22, 1990 (Sundance Film Festival); September 13, 1991 (United States)
- Running time: 88 minutes
- Country: United States
- Language: English

A Matter of Degrees is a 1990 American comedy film directed by W.T. Morgan, written by Morgan, Randall Poster, and Jack Mason, and produced by Poster and Kissin. The film stars Arye Gross, Judith Hoag (in her film debut), Tom Sizemore, and Wendell Pierce. John Doe has a featured role. The film was released on September 13, 1991, by 20th Century Fox.

== Plot ==
As a baby in a playpen, Max Glass screams when his parents suggest he'll grow up to become a lawyer. Twenty years later, he is a graduating senior at an unnamed college in Providence, Rhode Island who is struggling to figure out his future. He doesn't want to go to law school and is disappointed to get an acceptance letter from Columbia University, which throws him into an existential crisis.

Max is an indifferent student who lives with two quirky roommates—Kate Blum and Zeno Stefanos. He spends much of his time at the college's progressive rock station, WXOX, hanging out with his friend, Wells Dennard. Other DJs include Moonboy and Bambi. WXOX's main disc jockey and founder, Peter Downs, is a hero to Max. The station is threatened by developers who wish to raze it and the surrounding block. Peter initially battles against this, but then surrenders to the inevitable and leaves town.

Max continues to fight against the developers, thereby angering the college's administration and risking his chances of graduating. He also runs into trouble with the police after he breaks into the apartment of Lisa, with whom he had had a brief affair.

Wells and Katie participate in the college's commencement, but Max disrupts the ceremony by taking over WXOX and blasting his anti-corporate message over a public-address speaker. His final message is, "Rock and roll can save you." The film ends with him in the radio station's studio and his future is uncertain.

== Cast ==
- Arye Gross as Maxwell Glass
- Judith Hoag as Kate Blum
- Tom Sizemore as Zeno Stefanos
- John Doe as Peter Downs
- Wendell Pierce as Wells Dennard
- Sarah Bork as Cynthia
- Margaret Stassa as Lisa
- Tom Gilroy as "The Scuzz"
- Jim Dunbar as Frank Dell
- Benny Benowitz as Smart Student
- Harry Cooper as "Babe"
- Christina Haag as Isabelle Allen
- Michael Imperioli as Zeno's Assistant
- Michael Balcanoff as Professor Eliot Eastman
- Fred Schneider as "Moonboy"
- Kate Pierson as Bambi
- Gilbert McCauley as Roger
- Kate Mailer as Nan
- Wayne Chou as Stu
- John F. Kennedy Jr. as Guitar Playing Romeo
- Hope Nicholls as Band Leader
- Fetchin' Bones as The Band
- Jon Campbell as "Swede"

== Production ==
The film was largely shot on the Brown University campus and its story was inspired by the switch of WBRU, a Brown station, from a free-form format to a commercial one.

The film features appearances from members of rock bands, such as John Doe of X (in the role of Peter Downs) and Fred Schneider and Kate Pierson of The B-52's (as DJs Moonboy and Bambi). John F. Kennedy Jr. also makes a brief cameo as a guitar-playing coed at a party.

== Release ==
A Matter of Degrees had its world premiere at the 1990 Sundance Film Festival. It also screened at the Chicago International Film Festival in October 1990. It was given a limited release in the United States on September 13, 1991.

== Reception ==
Marc Savlov of the Austin Chronicle reviewed the film positively and awarded it 3 and 1/2 stars out of 5. He wrote its depiction of young people caught between their college years and the adult world was accurate and relatable, and noted the film "continues mining [the] vein of early-90s, twenty-something angst, though Morgan is less of a cynic than many of his indie contemporaries."

Janet Maslin of The New York Times wrote the film "drifts with Max from classroom to junkyard to corporate party, touching all the bases of a counterculture on the verge of extinction but still clinging to a distinctive world view", but noted, "The best of A Matter of Degrees is merely atmospheric and anecdotal. And a lot of it has the drifting feel of a good-natured anecdote without an ending."
