= Edward Charles (RAF officer) =

Canadian flying ace of WWII

Edward Francis John Charles
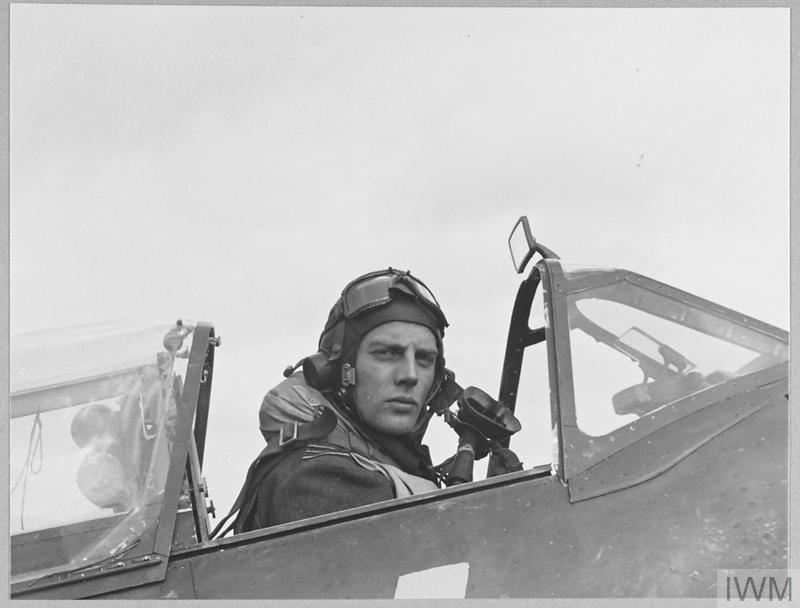
- Charles seated in the cockpit of his Spitfire fighter, 1943
- Born: 6 February 1919; Coventry, England
- Died: 5 November 1986 (aged 67); Vancouver, Canada
- Military career
- Allegiance: Canada
- Branch: Royal Canadian Air Force; Royal Air Force
- Service years: 1938–1939 (RCAF); 1939–1944 (RAF); 1944–1951 (RCAF)
- Rank: Wing Commander
- Commands: RAF Tangmere; Portreath Wing; Middle Wallop Wing; No. 611 Squadron
- Conflicts: Second World War: Battle of Britain; Circus offensive
- Awards: Distinguished Service Order; Distinguished Flying Cross and Bar; Silver Star (United States)

Edward Francis John Charles, DSO, DFC & Bar (6 February 1919 – 5 November 1986) was an English-born Canadian officer and flying ace who served in both the Royal Canadian Air Force (RCAF) and the Royal Air Force (RAF) during the Second World War. During his service with the RAF, he was credited with at least fifteen aerial victories.

Born in Coventry, Charles's family emigrated to Saskatchewan in Canada when he was a child. He joined the RCAF in early 1938 and transferred to the RAF the following year. After his training was completed, he was posted to No. 81 (Communications) Squadron. He volunteered to serve with Fighter Command in August 1940 and was sent to No. 54 Squadron, flying the Supermarine Spitfire fighter. He flew during the later stages of the Battle of Britain, then in the Circus offensive the following year, during which he claimed several aircraft destroyed. Awarded the Distinguished Flying Cross (DFC) in July 1941, he spent the final few months of the year and most of 1942 on instructing duties.

Charles returned to operations in early 1943 and was soon appointed commander of No. 611 Squadron. Later in the year, he flew as a wing leader from Middle Wallop and then Portreath. During this time he was awarded the Distinguished Service Order, having already received a bar to his DFC earlier in the year. He subsequently took up a staff role at No. 10 Group and was later transferred to the RCAF. He later served on the staff of the Allied Expeditionary Air Forces and as commander of Tangmere station. In the postwar period he remained in the RCAF but by 1949 had developed schizophrenia and was discharged from the RCAF on medical grounds two years later. He spent the remainder of his life in hospital care in Vancouver where he died in 1986, aged 67.

== Early life ==
Edward Francis John Charles was born in Coventry, England, on 6 February 1919, the son of a former pilot in the Royal Flying Corps. His family moved to Canada as a child, settling in Lashburn, Saskatchewan. Educated at Lashburn High School, Charles served in the militia from June 1937, as part of the 16th/22nd Saskatchewan Horse, and then in January 1938, he joined the Royal Canadian Air Force (RCAF). The following year he went to the United Kingdom and was granted a five-year short service commission as a pilot officer in the Royal Air Force (RAF), with effect from 15 May 1939. After training at No. 5 Flying Training School at Shotwick and then No. 3 Flying Training School at South Cerney, he went to the School of Army Co-Operation in September 1939.

== Second World War ==
Posted to No. 81 Squadron in December 1939, Charles served with this unit until June 1940. He was transferred to No. 2 Squadron, which operated Westland Lysanders in an Army Co-Operation role, but within a matter of weeks volunteered for Fighter Command. In August, he went to No. 7 Operational Training Unit and the next month was posted to No. 54 Squadron. By this time he was a flying officer, having been promoted to this rank on 3 September. The squadron, operating Supermarine Spitfire fighters, had been intensively engaged in the aerial fighting over the southeast of England during the peak of the Battle of Britain and was now based at Catterick. It carried out the odd scramble to intercept approaching Luftwaffe bombers but otherwise saw little action.

=== Circus offensive ===
In February 1941, No. 54 Squadron relocated to Hornchurch and began to be involved in Fighter Command's circus offensive, regularly flying sweeps to France to draw out Luftwaffe fighters and to escort bombers. On one of these, carried out on 17 April, Charles shot down a Messerschmitt Bf 110 heavy fighter to the east of Manston, his first aerial victory. Following an engagement over Cap Gris-Nez, he claimed a Messerschmitt Bf 109 fighter as probably destroyed on 17 June, beginning a run of successes over the next month. On 21 June, flying as part of the Hornchurch fighter wing, he destroyed a Bf 109 over the English Channel and three days later, over the Pas-de-Calais region, probably destroyed another. While over Lille on 27 June, he shot down a Bf 109 which was followed by a claim for another Bf 109 as probably destroyed on 30 June. Another Bf 109 was claimed as a probable on 4 July and on the same sortie, over Béthune, he definitively destroyed a second. On 8 July, he shared in the probable destruction of a Bf 109 near Lille and the next day shot down a Bf 109 while flying near Saint-Omer. His successes saw him awarded the Distinguished Flying Cross (DFC), the official announcement being made on 15 July. The published citation read:

This officer has displayed exceptional zeal and immense enthusiasm during the many offensive sweeps carried out by his unit. He has destroyed at least three enemy aircraft.

— London Gazette, No. 35219, 15 July 1941

On 20 July, Charles, now flying a Spitfire Mk Vb, shot down a Bf 109 over Le Touquet. He claimed Bf 109s as probably destroyed on 23 July and 17 September. By this time a flight lieutenant, his last aerial victory with No. 54 Squadron was on 27 September, when he shared in the destruction of a Bf 109 off Mardyck. He was posted away to the Central Flying School for training on instructing duties, after which he was sent to No. 9 Service Flying Training School. Most of 1942 was spent as an instructor.

=== Service at Biggin Hill ===
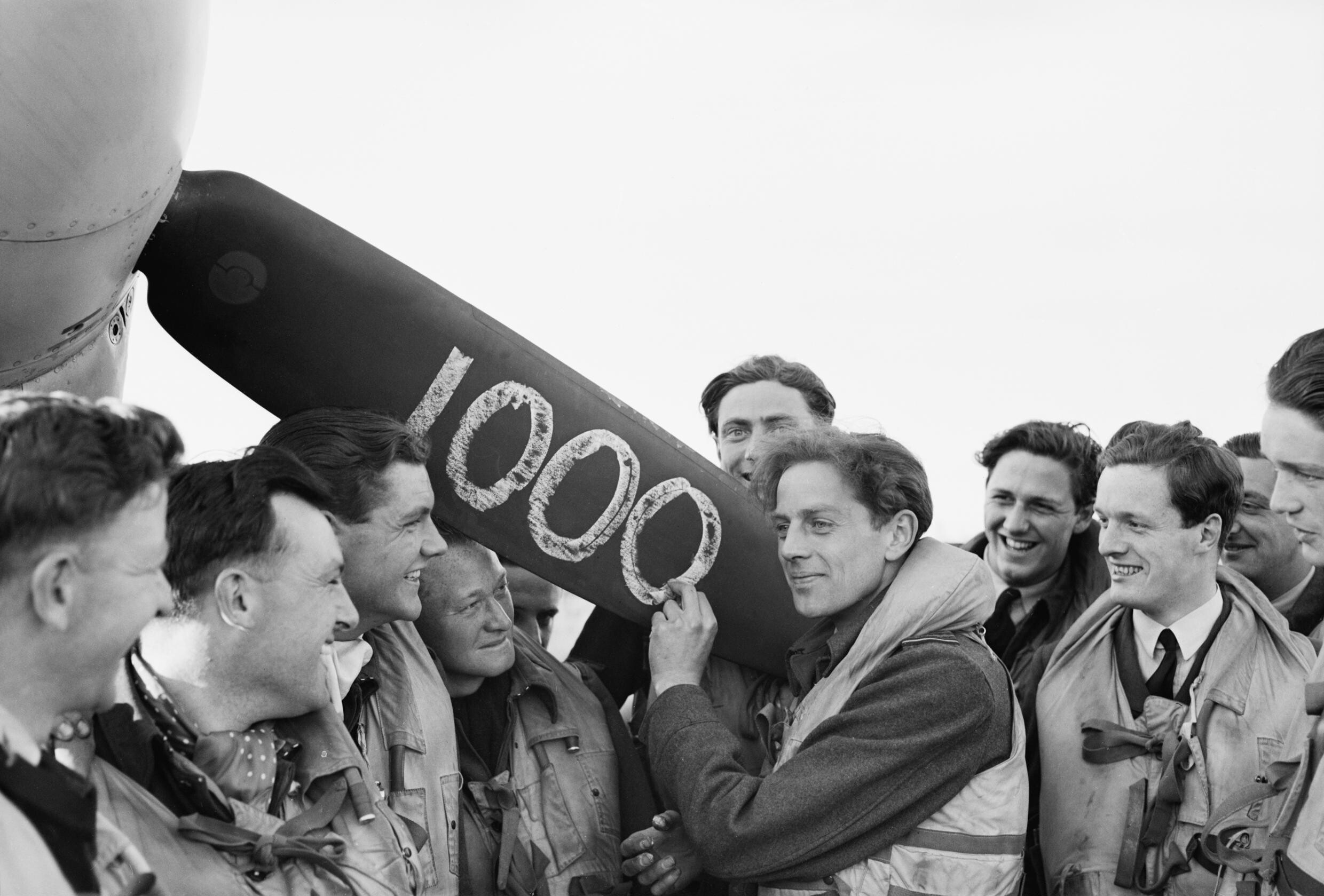
Charles, commanding No. 611 Squadron, in a publicity photograph taken to celebrate Biggin Hill sector's 1,000th aerial victory following a sortie over Normandy on 15 May 1943

Charles returned to operations in January 1943, having been posted to No. 64 Squadron. A Spitfire squadron, this was part of the fighter wing at Hornchurch, tasked with sweeps and escort missions to occupied Europe. After nearly three months, during which he damaged a Focke-Wulf Fw 190 while on a sortie inland of Dunkirk, he was transferred to No. 611 Squadron as a flight commander. His new squadron, using the Spitfire Mk IX, was based at Biggin Hill as part of the fighter wing there. He made his first claim with the unit on 18 April, destroying a Fw 190 over the Bay d'Authie. A few days afterwards he was given command of the unit. He damaged a Fw 190 on 4 May, and three days later repeated the feat, this time with a Bf 109. He shot down a Fw 190 on 14 May and the next day, flying to the southeast of Caen, destroyed a pair of Fw 190s. The second of these may have been the 1,000th aircraft to have been destroyed by a squadron of the Biggin Hill. As Commandant René Mouchotte, the commander of No. 341 Squadron also shot down a Fw 190 at about the same time, the two shared a sweepstake that was running for the pilot that claimed the 1,000th aircraft. Two days afterward, he shot down yet another Fw 190 near Cabourg. He destroyed a further example of the same type on 23 June and claimed a second as damaged on 5 July. His successes was rewarded with an announcement of a Bar to his DFC on 16 July; the published citation read:

This officer is a first class fighter, whose fine leadership, cool judgement and efficiency have set an admirable example. He has destroyed 13 enemy aircraft and damaged several more.

— London Gazette, No. 36094, 16 July 1943

In recognition of the squadron's efforts escorting bombers of the USAAF on raids to France, Charles was awarded the Silver Star, a United States gallantry medal, just five days later. The same day this was announced, Charles shot down a Fw 190 and damaged a Bf 109 while flying a sortie over Amsterdam. Later in the month the squadron moved north to re-equip with Spitfire Mk LF. Vbs.

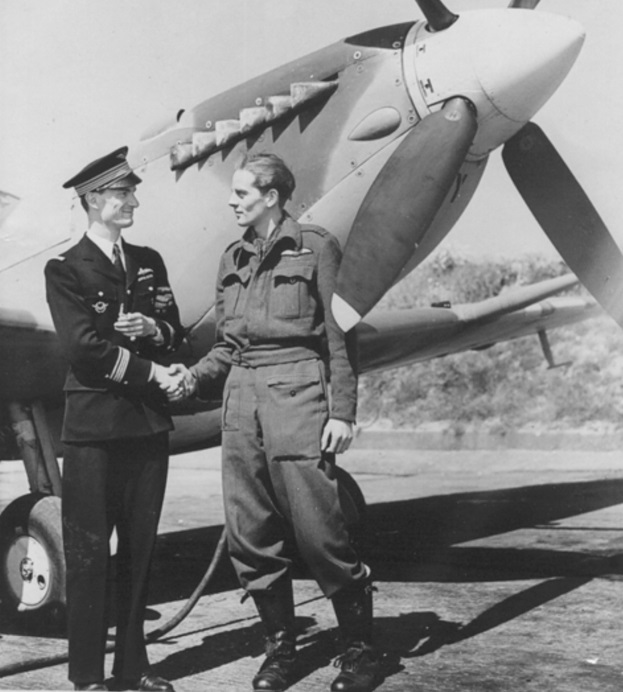
Charles with the Free French pilot and commander of No. 341 Squadron René Mouchotte; the two claimed what were Biggin Hill's 999th and 1,000 aerial victories

In August, Charles, promoted to wing commander, was appointed leader of the fighter wing at Middle Wallop. In this capacity he destroyed a Fw 190 near Île de Batz. The next month, he became commander of the fighter wing at Portreath. On a sortie while leading the wing he shot down a Bf 110 west of Brest. He was taken off operations at the end of the month and sent to the headquarters of No. 10 Group, Fighter Command. At the end of October, Charles was awarded the Distinguished Service Order. The published citation read:

Wing Cdr Charles is an inspiring leader, whose great skill and tenacity have contributed materially to the successes obtained by the formations with which he has flown. In September, 1943, he led a formation of fighters which acted as escort to a bomber force detailed to attack an airfield in Northern France. During the operation, 12 enemy fighters were engaged and, in the ensuing combats, four of the hostile aircraft were shot down, one of them by Wing Cdr. Charles. This officer has destroyed at least 15 enemy aircraft and has displayed great courage and unflagging devotion to duty.

— London Gazette, No. 36226, 29 October 1943

=== Later war service ===
Returning to Canada at the start of 1944, Charles embarked on a lecture tour of the country before returning to Europe in April. The next month, his short service commission with the RAF ended and he transferred back to the RCAF. He took up a staff role at the Allied Expeditionary Air Forces before becoming the commander of Tangmere Station. He ended the war credited with having shot down fifteen German aircraft, with a sixteenth shared, and six and one shared as probably destroyed. He is also credited with damaging five aircraft.

== Later life ==
After the war, Charles returned to Canada and continued to serve in the RCAF but within a few years became mentally unwell. In 1949, he was diagnosed with schizophrenia. The stresses of his service during the Second World War may have contributed to the condition. Although this was successfully treated, he suffered a recurrence of the condition and was discharged from the RCAF on the grounds of ill health in 1951. He was hospitalised at Shaughnessy Veterans' Hospital in Vancouver, and remained here for the rest of his life receiving treatment. He died at the hospital on 6 November 1986, aged 67.
