= Cusi Cram =

American dramatist (born 1967)

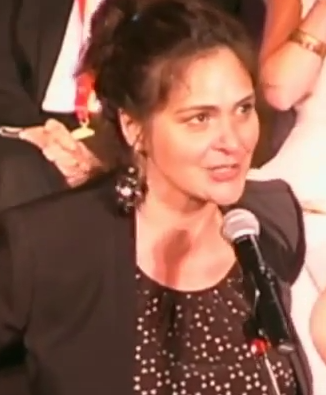
- Cram at the June 2015 Lilly Awards
- Born: September 22, 1967 (age 59); Manhattan, New York, U.S.
- Education: Brown University (BA); Juilliard School (GrDip)
- Occupations: Playwright, screenwriter, actress, model, director, educator
- Spouse: Peter Hirsch
- Parent: Lady Jeanne Campbell (mother)
- Relatives: Kate Mailer (half-sister); Ian Campbell, 11th Duke of Argyll (maternal grandfather); Janet Gladys Aitken (maternal grandmother); Max Aitken, 1st Baron Beaverbrook (great-grandfather)
- Writing career
- Years active: 1980–present

Cusi Cram (born September 22, 1967) is an American playwright, screenwriter, actress, model, director, educator, and advocate for women in the arts.

== Early life ==
Cusi Cram was born in Manhattan, New York, on September 22, 1967, to Lady Jeanne Campbell, daughter of Ian Campbell, 11th Duke of Argyll and Janet Gladys Aitken, and granddaughter of Max Aitken, 1st Baron Beaverbrook; Lady Jeanne was married at the time to John Cram III, a descendant of railroad developer Jay Gould. Her biological father, however, was Bolivian and worked at the United Nations. She identifies as Latina and has written extensively about her Latin roots in her plays.

Cram's first foray into the world of theater came at age six when she played the role of Moth in a production of A Midsummer Night's Dream at the Alabama Shakespeare Festival. Campbell had previously been married to Norman Mailer, with whom she remained friends after their divorce. Mailer's later wife Norris Church, a former actress and model, suggested that Cram try out modelling. At age 13, she did, becoming the youngest model ever to sign with Wilhelmina Models, Church's former agency. At the time, Cram attended the Chapin School in Manhattan. Of her modeling days she has said, "And at the time—and I think times have changed a lot—[the look] was very blonde and blue eyed, so I was considered very, very ethnic looking ..."

== Career ==
While working with Wilhelmina, Cram modeled for a variety of publications including Interview, Seventeen, Brides, and Young Miss. While still 13, she joined the cast of the soap opera One Life to Live on ABC. She originated the role of Cassie Callison, a job that required her to leave the Chapin School for the Professional Children's School which allowed her time to both study and participate in filming. She eventually transitioned from acting to playwriting during her twenties, graduated from Brown University in 1990, and landed a job writing for the animated PBS show Arthur.

Cram worked in regional theaters in Massachusetts, California, and Colorado, and had some of her work produced Off-Off-Broadway. Her work on Arthur inspired her 2009 play Dusty and the Big Bad World. The Arthur spinoff Postcards from Buster was subject to a controversy that eventually involved United States Secretary of Education Margaret Spellings after an episode depicted a Vermont family with two lesbian mothers. Dusty, which premiered at the Denver Center for the Performing Arts, was a comic retelling of the controversy. Cram's Off-Broadway debut also came in 2009 when her play A Lifetime Burning, based on the experiences of author Margaret Seltzer and the discovery of her partially fictitious memoir Love and Consequences, was produced at 59E59 Theaters by Primary Stages.

Aside from Arthur, Cram has also written for the Cbeebies children's television series The Octonauts, and contributed two episodes to the Showtime comedy-drama The Big C. As of January 2014, she teaches playwriting as part of the joint Fordham University – Primary Stages Master of Fine Arts program.

=== Production history ===
| Title | Date premiered | Theater | Notes | Ref. |
|---|---|---|---|---|
| Landlocked | November 11, 1999 | Miranda Theatre | | |
| The End of It All | June 15, 2000 | South Coast Repertory | Part of the Pacific Playwrights Festival | |
| Normal | March 1, 2003 | Actors Theatre of Louisville | One-act play, anthologized in Trepidation Nation | |
| Corduroy | January 11, 2004 | Theatreworks USA | Musical, with book by Cram and music by Scott Davenport Richards Based on the children's book of the same name by Don Freeman | |
| Predator | June 29, 2004 | Echo Theater Company | One-act play | |
| Fuente | July 9, 2005 | Barrington Stage | Recipient of the 2004 Herrick Theater Foundation New Play Prize Previewed beginning June 30 | |
| All the Bad Things | February 15, 2006 | The Public Theater | Produced by LAByrinth Theater Company | |
| Lucy and the Conquest | July 12, 2006 | Williamstown Theatre Festival | | |
| Dusty and the Big Bad World | January 29, 2009 | Denver Center Theater | | |
| A Lifetime Burning | August 11, 2009 | 59E59 Theaters | Produced by Primary Stages | |
| Fuente Ovejuna: A Disloyal Adaptation | November 11, 2011 | Lewis Center for the Arts | Based on Lope de Vega's Fuenteovejuna | |
| Radiance | November 16, 2012 | Bank Street Theater | One-act play Produced by LAByrinth Theater Company | |

Additionally, Cram's one-act West of Stupid was anthologized in The Best American Short Plays 2000-2001. She has also performed two one-woman shows, Bolivia and Euripidames, at New Georges in New York City.

== Personal life ==
Cram lives with her husband, Peter Hirsch, also a writer on Arthur, in Greenwich Village, New York.
