= Vicki Hodge =

English actress and model

- Born: 17 October 1946 (age 80); Chiddingfold, England
- Occupations: Actress; model

Vicki Alexandra Hodge (born 17 October 1946) is an English actress and model. She appeared in the films Every Home Should Have One (1970), Layout for 5 Models (1972), The Stud (1974), and Confessions of a Sex Maniac (1974), as well as the TV series Hazell. She was interviewed extensively for the "Starring John Bindon" programme in the Real Crime television series about her relationship with John Bindon.

== Life and career ==
Hodge was born at Timbers Chase, her family's country house in Chiddingfold, Surrey, the third daughter of Sir John Rowland Hodge, 2nd Baronet, a Lieutenant Commander in the Royal Navy Volunteer Reserve, second lieutenant in the Oxfordshire and Buckinghamshire Light Infantry, and Fellow of the Royal Historical Society, and his second wife Joan, daughter of Sydney Foster Wilson. She attended the Legat School of Russian Ballet, when it was at Finchcocks, Goudhurst, Kent. She then attended the Lucie Clayton School of Modelling and was photographed by David Bailey, amongst others.

From 1968 to 1981, Hodge was the girlfriend of Fulham gangster and actor John Bindon. She is also a former girlfriend of Prince Andrew, Duke of York; an item about their relationship appeared in the News of the World in 1984.

In 1969, she married (George) Ian Alexander Heath (died 1996), son of Sir Barrie Heath, once a chairman of GKN; they divorced in 1980. Her sister, Wendy Kidd (née Hodge) is mother of Jodie Kidd and Jemma Kidd.
