= Janet Gladys Aitken =

Canadian-British aristocrat and socialite (1908–1988)

The Honourable Janet Gladys Aitken
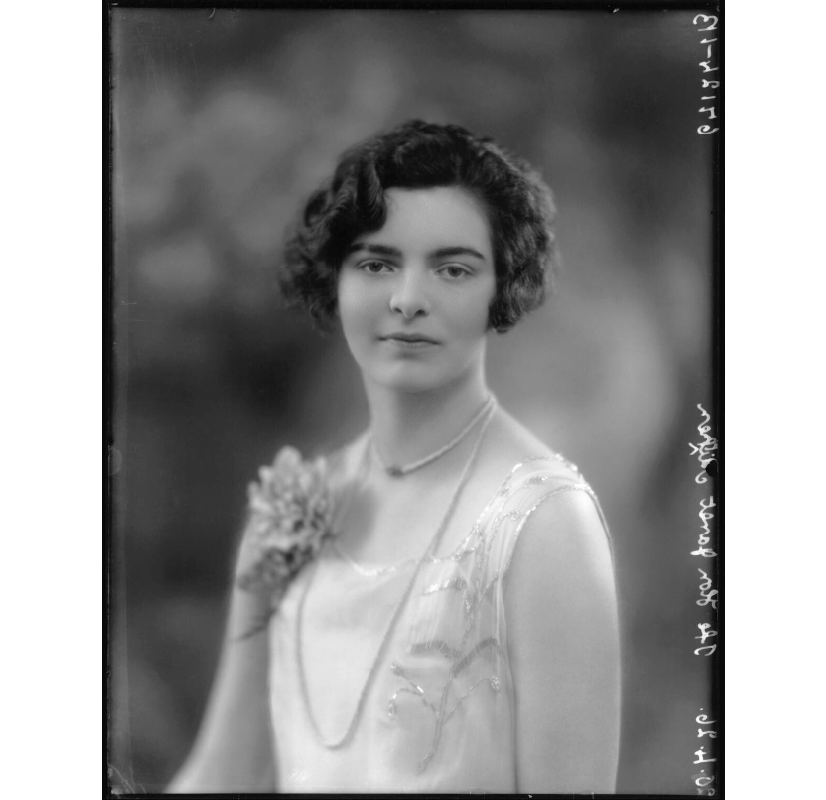
- Aitken in 1926
- Born: 9 July 1908; Halifax, Nova Scotia, Canada
- Died: 18 November 1988 (aged 80); Ewhurst, Surrey, England
- Resting place: St. Michael's Churchyard, Mickleham
- Other names: Janet Campbell; Janet Montagu; Janet Kidd
- Occupations: Socialite; writer; equestrian; pilot; horse breeder
- Spouses: Ian Douglas Campbell (m. 1927; div. 1934) William Drogo Sturges Montagu (m. 1935; died 1940) Thomas Edward Dealtry Kidd (m. 1942; died 1979)
- Children: 4, including Lady Jeanne Campbell
- Father: Max Aitken, 1st Baron Beaverbrook
- Relatives: Sir Max Aitken, 2nd Baronet (brother); Jodie Kidd (granddaughter); Jemma Wellesley, Countess of Mornington (granddaughter); Cusi Cram (granddaughter); Kate Mailer (granddaughter)

Janet Gladys Aitken (later Campbell, Montagu, and Kidd; 9 July 1908 – 18 November 1988) was a Canadian-British aristocrat and socialite. The daughter of Max Aitken, 1st Baron Beaverbrook, she grew up at Cherkley Court in Surrey. She was the first wife of Ian Campbell, later the Duke of Argyll, and the mother of Lady Jeanne Campbell. Her second husband, who was a son of the 9th Earl of Sandwich, died in World War II. She married a third time to the Canadian army officer Major Thomas Edward Dealtry Kidd.

An accomplished equestrian, Aitken served as a director of the All England Jumping Course at Hickstead for over twenty years. In her later life she obtained a license as a helicopter pilot and bred Fjord horses on her farm in Ewhurst, Surrey. A prominent socialite of her time, she was known to entertain members of the international jet set, politicians, and royalty at her second home in Barbados, where she was a friend and neighbour of the American diplomat W. Averell Harriman. In 1987, the year before she died, Aitken authored an autobiography titled The Beaverbrook Girl.

== Early life and family ==
Aitken was born on 9 July 1908 in Halifax, Nova Scotia to Max Aitken, the owner of the Daily Express, and Gladys Henderson Drury. Her paternal grandparents were William Cuthbert Aitken, a Scottish-born Presbyterian minister, and Jane Noble, the daughter of a wealthy farmer and storekeeper. Her maternal grandfather was Major-General Charles William Drury CBE, who was a cousin of Admiral Sir Charles Carter Drury. The Drury family descended from Colonel Charles Drury of Ireland, who immigrated to Saint John, New Brunswick in 1805. She was also descended from the Hazen family of Massachusetts.

Aitken's brother, Wing Commander Sir Max Aitken, 2nd Baronet, was a fighter pilot with No. 601 Squadron RAF during World War II.

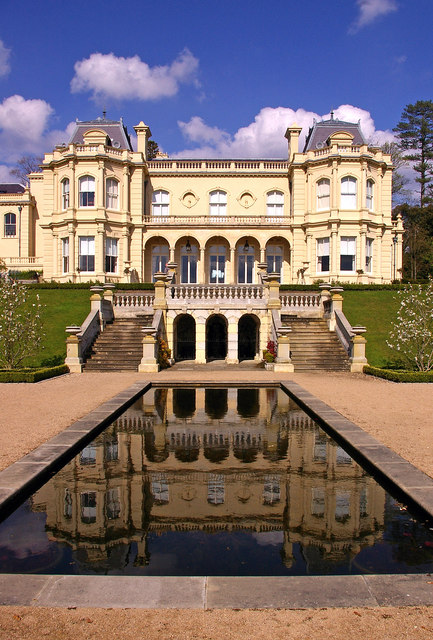
Cherkley Court, Aitken's childhood home in Surrey

In 1910 the family moved from Canada to the United Kingdom, and her father bought Cherkley Court, a mansion in Surrey. She grew up with her family entertaining Sir Winston Churchill, Rudyard Kipling, and David Lloyd George at their home. In July 1916, Aitken's father was created a baronet by George V. On 23 January 1917 her father was elevated to the peerage as 1st Baron Beaverbrook, at which time she was entitled to use the style The Honourable, as the daughter of a baron. After her mother died, her father married Marcia Anastasia Christoforides, the widow of his friend Sir James Dunn.

== Marriages ==
Aitken met Ian Douglas Campbell, a member of Clan Campbell and heir to the 10th Duke of Argyll, at a casino in Le Touquet, France. They married in 1927 and had one daughter, Jeanne. She was Campbell's first wife. She and Campbell divorced in 1934. Through her daughter and son-in-law, Norman Mailer, she is the grandmother of American actresses Cusi Cram and Kate Mailer.

She married a second time, in 1935, to The Honourable William Drogo Sturges Montagu, the second son of George Montagu, 9th Earl of Sandwich and Alberta Montagu, Countess of Sandwich. Her husband, who was a flying instructor with the Royal Air Force, was killed in 1940 while fighting in World War II.

In 1942 she married a third time, to Canadian Army officer Major Thomas Edward Dealtry Kidd MBE, the son of Honorary Major Rev. William Ennis Kidd MC. Her third husband, who was from a prominent Canadian family, was a nephew of Thomas Kidd and a relative of George Nelson Kidd and Edward Kidd. She and Kidd moved to a farm in rural England, where they enjoyed fox hunting and were neighbors of Evelyn Waugh. They had a son, John Edward Aitken Kidd, who was the father of Jodie Kidd and Jemma Madeleine Wellesley, Countess of Mornington. Her third husband died in 1979.

== Later life and death ==
She served as a trustee of the Beaverbrook Foundation from 1954 to 1964.

In 1960, Aitken bought a second home in Barbados, where she was known to entertain members of the international jet set, politicians, and royalty. She was a close friend of the American diplomat W. Averell Harriman, who also had a home in Barbados.

On 9 July 1968, she obtained her helicopter pilot's license.

Aitken was an accomplished equestrian but twice broke her back falling off from horses. After her second back injury, she took up horse-drawn carriage racing and bred Fjord horses on her farm. She served as a director of the All England Jumping Course at Hickstead for over twenty years.

In 1987, she published an autobiography titled The Beaverbrook Girl: An Autobiography.

She died on 18 November 1988 at her home in Ewhurst, Surrey, England. She is buried next to her third husband at St. Michael's Churchyard, Mickleham.

== In popular culture ==
Aitken is portrayed by Sophie Ward in the 2021 historical drama series A Very British Scandal.
