= Kate Mailer =

American actress and writer (born 1962)

- Born: August 18, 1962 (age 63); New York City, U.S.
- Occupation: Actress
- Parent(s): Norman Mailer; Lady Jeanne Campbell
- Relatives: Susan Mailer (half-sister); Michael Mailer (half-brother); Stephen Mailer (half-brother); John Buffalo Mailer (half-brother); Cusi Cram (half-sister)

Kate Mailer (born August 18, 1962) is an American stage and film actress and daughter of American author-playwright Norman Mailer and third wife, journalist Lady Jeanne Campbell, daughter of the 11th Duke of Argyll and his first wife, The Honourable Janet Gladys Aitken. Her work includes roles on stage in the Anton Chekhov play The Cherry Orchard, and on film in Jean-Luc Godard's adaptation of the William Shakespeare play King Lear with Burgess Meredith (1987) and in W. T. Morgan's A Matter of Degrees with Arye Gross (1990). She has since become a writer.
