= Jemma Kidd =

British model and make-up artist (b. 1974)

Jemma, Marchioness of Douro
- Born: Jemma Madeleine Kidd; 20 September 1974 (age 52); Guildford, England
- Occupations: Make up artist; former fashion model
- Spouse(s): Arthur Wellesley, Marquess of Douro (m. 2005; div. 2021)
- Children: 3
- Relatives: Jodie Kidd (sister); Max Aitken, 1st Baron Beaverbrook (great-grandfather)

Jemma, Marchioness of Douro (née Kidd; born 20 September 1974), is a British make up artist and fashion model.

== Career ==
Lady Douro is the daughter of the businessman and former showjumper Johnny Kidd. She is the granddaughter of The Honourable Janet Gladys Aitken. One of Kidd's maternal great-grandfathers was the Canadian press baron Max Aitken, 1st Baron Beaverbrook. Kidd's mother, Wendy Madeleine Kidd (née Hodge), is one of the three daughters of Sir John Rowland Hodge, 2nd Baronet, and runs the Holders Festival on Barbados. Kidd's aunt is the model Vicki Hodge.

Lady Douro was a fashion model before becoming a make-up artist. In 2003, she opened her own "Make-up School" in London.

She was a director of the Jemma Kidd Make-up Limited, which was incorporated in 2005, Ghislaine Maxwell was also a director. The company launched a cosmetics range in 2006, which was available in the UK (in Boots), America, Australia, Hong Kong, and Canada.

Her book Jemma Kidd Make-up Masterclass was published in 2009.

Jemma Kidd Make-up went into administration in October 2012. The business was dissolved in January 2020.

== Personal life ==
Kidd married Arthur Wellesley, Marquess of Douro, son of Charles Wellesley, 9th Duke of Wellington and Princess Antonia of Prussia, on 4 June 2005 at St James Church in Holetown, Barbados.

The couple has twins and a younger son:

- Lady Mae Madeleine Wellesley (born 4 January 2010 at Chelsea and Westminster Hospital in London)
- (Arthur) Darcy Wellesley, Earl of Mornington (born 4 January 2010)
- Lord Alfred Wellesley (born 10 December 2014)

Lord and Lady Douro were divorced in 2021.
