= John Bindon =

English actor and bodyguard (1943–1993)

- Born: John Dennis Arthur Bindon; 4 October 1943; Fulham, London, England
- Died: 10 October 1993 (aged 50); Chelsea, London, England
- Resting place: Putney Vale Cemetery, London, England
- Occupations: Actor; bodyguard
- Years active: 1966–1979
- Height: 6 ft 2 in (1.88 m)

John Dennis Arthur Bindon (4 October 1943 – 10 October 1993) was an English actor and bodyguard who had close links with the London underworld.

The son of a London cab driver, Bindon was frequently in trouble as a youth for getting into fights, and spent two periods in borstal. He was spotted in a London pub by Ken Loach, who asked him to appear in his film Poor Cow (1967). Other film and television productions followed, with Bindon sought after to play gangsters or tough police detectives. He played a violent mobster alongside Mick Jagger in Performance (1970), a London crime boss in Get Carter (1971), and a prisoner with Paul Newman in The Mackintosh Man (1973). Philip Hoare described Bindon as "the archetypal actor-villain, and an all-round 'good geezer'".

Bindon was also known for having many socialite girlfriends, such as Christine Keeler, the former Playboy "Bunny Girl" Serena Williams, and Vicki Hodge, who had a 12-year abusive relationship with Bindon which ended in 1981, and a brief relationship with Mary Brennan. Through Hodge, the daughter of a baronet, Bindon gained access to British aristocratic circles, which culminated with his meeting Princess Margaret in the late 1960s, at her home on Mustique in the Caribbean.

Bindon lived his hard man persona on and off screen. He was believed to be running protection rackets in west London pubs and was alleged to have connections to the Kray twins and the Richardson Gang. In the late 1970s, in addition to acting work, he provided security for actors and musicians, most notoriously for Led Zeppelin on their 1977 US tour, where he was dismissed for brawling backstage.

In 1978, Bindon was tried for the murder of London gangster Johnny Darke. Bindon pleaded self-defence and was acquitted, but the case damaged his reputation, and that, coupled with being seen by directors as difficult to work with, meant his acting career declined. In the 1980s, Bindon became reclusive; he died in 1993.

== Early life ==
John Bindon was born in Fulham, London, and was the son of Dennis Bindon, a merchant seaman and engineer turned cab driver. The second eldest in a working-class family of three children, Bindon attended Henry Compton School in Fulham, but left at the age of 15. He was given the nickname "Biffo" for starting or getting into fights.

As a teenager, he served time in a borstal for possessing live ammunition. After jobs ranging from laying asphalt to dealing in antiques (his best friend for several years was the antiques dealer John Hobbs), Bindon pursued a career in acting.

== Acting and associations ==
Director Ken Loach, spotting him in a London pub in 1966, considered him perfect for the role of a rough husband in the film, Poor Cow (1967). His next big break came the following year with a role in Performance (not released until 1970) alongside Mick Jagger, where he played a violent mobster. His portrayal earned him critical praise and typecast him for future roles. Bindon was awarded the Queen's Award for Bravery, a police bravery medal, for diving off Putney Bridge into the River Thames to rescue a drowning man, in 1968, although some said he had pushed the man in and only rescued him when a policeman appeared.

In 1968, he met Vicki Hodge, a baronet's daughter turned model and actress, who introduced him to British aristocracy. However, he had been previously invited to the Caribbean island resort of Mustique, where Bindon claimed to have had sex with Princess Margaret. A biographer of the Princess, Noel Botham, firmly believed Bindon had an affair with her. Returning to Mustique for a second time in 1969, he took girlfriend Hodge with him.

The princess later denied meeting Bindon, despite pictures of them next to one another. During this time Bindon gained the nickname "Big John", due to the reported size of his penis. Apparently demonstrated on multiple occasions over decades, when inebriated, Bindon was able to hang five half-pint beer glasses from his manhood.

Bindon's name was also linked with a succession of models, including Christine Keeler, the former Playboy "Bunny Girl" Serena Williams, and also Angela Barnett, then girlfriend and future wife of pop star David Bowie.

Bindon's best known film roles were his appearance in Get Carter (1971) and the Who's film Quadrophenia (1979) as a drug dealer. He also appeared in television series such as Public Eye, The Gold Robbers, Department S, Dixon of Dock Green, Z-Cars, Paul Temple, Special Branch, Softly, Softly: Taskforce and Hazell playing out his usual tough-guy roles. Despite a productive film and television career, Bindon felt he needed a break from acting, and went into organising security. It was to be a move which would have disastrous personal and financial consequences.

== Oakland incident ==
In early 1977, Bindon was hired by Peter Grant on advice from tour manager Richard Cole as security coordinator for the rock group Led Zeppelin during their concert tour of the United States. He had previously provided security for actors Ryan and Tatum O'Neal (he had appeared in Barry Lyndon in a scene with Ryan). An incident involving Bindon occurred at the band's concert at the Oakland Coliseum on 23 July 1977, near the end of their US tour. Upon arrival at the stadium, it is alleged that Bindon pushed a member of promoter Bill Graham's stage crew out of the way as the band entered via a backstage ramp. As a result, tension had been simmering between Graham's staff and Led Zeppelin's security team during the day, and as Grant and Bindon were walking down the ramp near the end of the concert, words were exchanged with stage crew chief Jim Downey, which resulted in Bindon knocking Downey unconscious. Bindon maintained that he was goaded into the fight after Graham's crew referred to him as "a weak limey fuck".

Just minutes later a separate off-stage incident occurred. Bill Graham's security man Jim Matzorkis was accused of slapping Peter Grant's 11-year-old son Warren for taking a dressing room sign, and was savagely beaten up. Led Zeppelin's second Oakland show took place only after Bill Graham signed a letter of indemnification, absolving Led Zeppelin from responsibility for the previous night's incident. However, Graham refused to honour the letter and assault charges were laid against Grant, Cole, Bindon and John Bonham when the band arrived back at their hotel. The four received bail and later pleaded no contest, receiving suspended sentences. Bindon was dismissed by the band and returned to England. Grant later said that allowing Bindon to be hired was the biggest mistake he made as manager.

== Darke murder trial ==
In 1978, Bindon became involved in a fight with John Darke, a London gangster, outside the Ranelagh Yacht Club, in Fulham, London. Darke was stabbed nine times, resulting in his death, and Bindon managed to flee to Dublin with his own knife wounds covered up. He gave himself up to police and was subsequently tried at the Old Bailey in October 1979. The prosecution claimed that this was a £10,000 contract killing over drugs, with the fight as a cover for the death. However, the defence argued that Darke's death was in self-defence, saying Bindon was in fear of his life as he was being blackmailed about losing drug money and cocaine worth thousands of pounds.

Bindon was acquitted of Darke's murder in November 1979. It was reported that the "substantial appearance" of actor Bob Hoskins as a character witness at the trial helped sway the jury's verdict and that the judge, Sir William Mars-Jones, "had been sympathetic towards Bindon in his summing-up and unhappy with the ragbag of witnesses produced by the prosecution".

== Later years and death ==
During the 1980s, Bindon became a reclusive figure, spending more of his time at his Belgravia flat. He died on 10 October 1993, aged 50. According to Philip Hoare's obituary in The Independent, he died from cancer.

== References in popular culture ==
In 2002, a Carlton Television documentary of Bindon's life entitled Real Crime: Starring John Bindon was screened in the UK on ITV. It featured archival footage of Bindon behind the scenes and interviews with Angie Bowie, Vicki Hodge, Billy Murray, George Sewell and James Whitaker. Bindon also featured in the Carlton documentary for ITV, The Secret Life of Princess Margaret, broadcast in 2005. Bindon's relationship with Princess Margaret was the subject of Channel 4's documentary The Princess and the Gangster, which was broadcast on 9 February 2009.

In 2010, Bindon was the subject of Ten Men: The Lives of John Bindon, a one-man verse play written and directed by Franklyn McCabe, with Matthew Houghton playing Bindon. The play was performed at the Open House pub theatre as part of the Brighton Fringe Festival in 2010.

Bindon appeared as a character played by the actor Jason Merrells in the stage play A Princess Undone which opened at the Cambridge Arts Theatre in October 2016.

== Filmography ==
- From Russia with Love (1963) – Airport Passerby (uncredited)
- Poor Cow (1967) – Tom
- Inspector Clouseau (1968) – Bull Parker
- Performance (1970) – Moody
- Get Carter (10 March 1971) – Sid Fletcher
- Man in the Wilderness (1971) – Coulter
- The Mackintosh Man (1973) – Buster
- No Sex Please, We're British (1973) – Pete
- Love Thy Neighbour (1973) – White Groom
- Dead Cert (1974) – Walter
- 11 Harrowhouse (1974) (US title: Anything for Love) – Second Guard
- Juggernaut (1974) (US title: Terror On the Britannic) – Driscoll
- Barry Lyndon (1975) – Recruiting soldier
- Trial by Combat (1976) – 2nd Reagan Brother
- Quadrophenia (14 May 1979) – Harry

== Television appearances ==
- The Gold Robbers (1969) – Terry Lardner
- Department S (1969) – Greer
- Z-Cars (1969) – Buzz Bentley
- Special Branch: Intercept (1974) – Harry Beauchamp
- Softly, Softly: Task Force (1976) – Edward Dinsdale
- Hazell (1979) – Jack Horner
- The Racing Game (1979) – Terry Flynn
