= Sir Max Aitken, 2nd Baronet =

Canadian-British fighter pilot (1910–1985)

Sir Max Aitken Bt DSO DFC
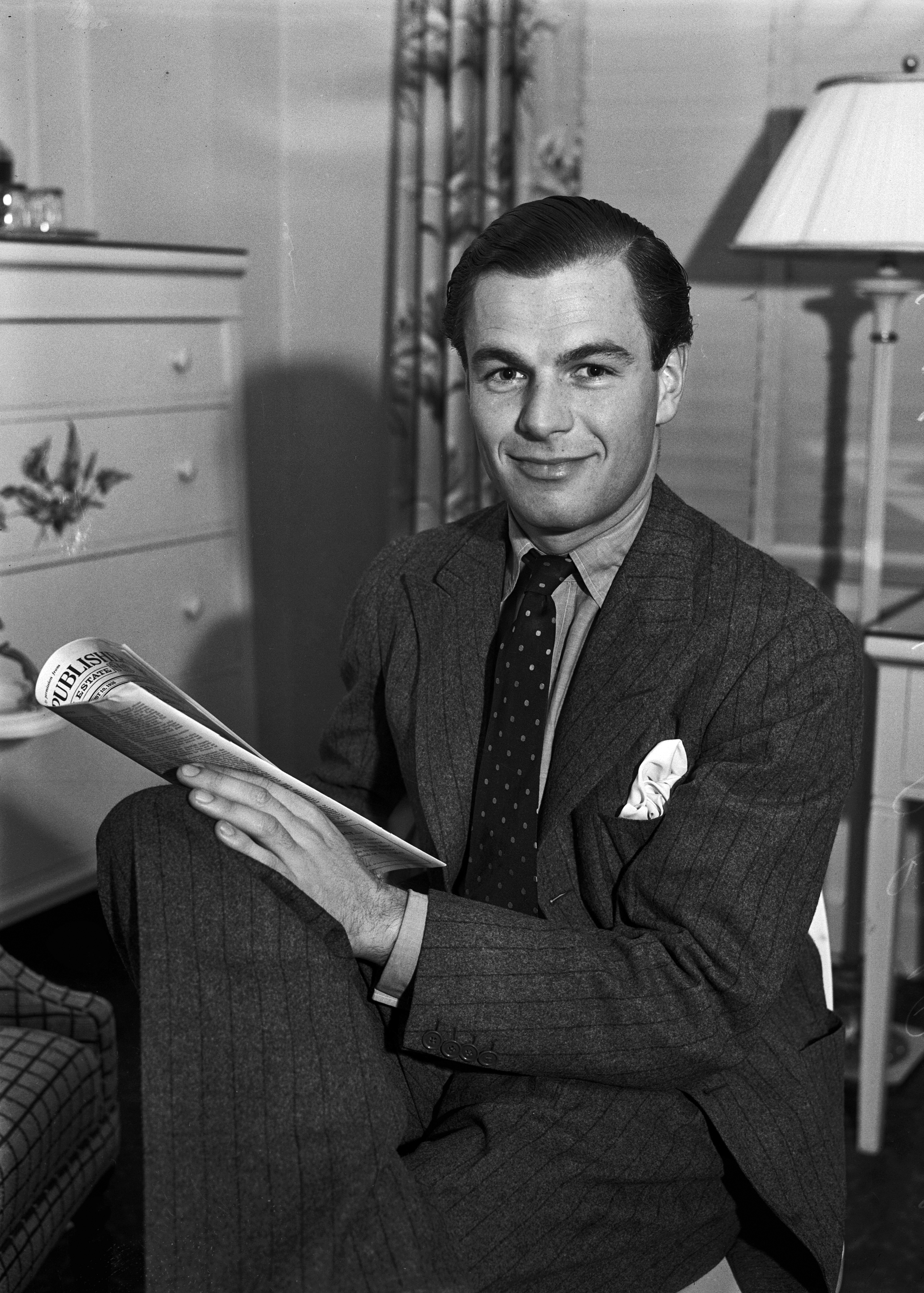
- Aitken in 1936
- Born: John William Maxwell Aitken; 15 February 1910; Montreal, Quebec, Canada
- Died: 30 April 1985 (aged 75)
- Relatives: Max Aitken, 1st Baron Beaverbrook (father); Maxwell Aitken, 3rd Baron Beaverbrook (son); Janet Gladys Aitken (sister)
- Military career
- Allegiance: United Kingdom
- Branch: Royal Air Force
- Service years: 1935–1952
- Rank: Group Captain
- Commands: Banff Strike Wing (1944–45); No. 68 Squadron RAF (1941–43); No. 601 Squadron RAF (1940)
- Conflicts: Second World War: Battle of Britain
- Awards: Companion of the Distinguished Service Order; Distinguished Flying Cross; Mentioned in Despatches; War Cross (Czechoslovakia)
- Other work: Chairman of Beaverbrook Newspapers Ltd. Politician

Sir John William Maxwell Aitken, 2nd Baronet, DSO, DFC (15 February 1910 – 30 April 1985), briefly 2nd Baron Beaverbrook in 1964, was a Canadian-British fighter pilot and flying ace of the Second World War, a Conservative politician, and press baron. He was the son of Max Aitken, 1st Baron Beaverbrook.

== Early life ==
Aitken was born on 15 February 1910 in Montreal, the son of Gladys Henderson (Drury) and Max Aitken (later Lord Beaverbrook). He was the brother of Janet Gladys Aitken. He was educated at Sandroyd School then Downsend School, Westminster School and Pembroke College, Cambridge. A talented sportsman, he was a university blue at football and a scratch golfer. He was also a keen flyer and spent some time in the thirties flying throughout Europe and the USA. He joined the Auxiliary Air Force (AAF) in 1935, serving part-time with No. 601 Squadron. The squadron, the first to be formed in the AAF, was well known for its mostly affluent flying personnel. Although a fighter squadron, it was equipped with Hawker Hart light bombers until it began swapping these for the Hawker Demon fighter the year after Aitken joined. He was commissioned a pilot officer on 11 September, and was promoted to flying officer on 14 April 1937.

== Second World War ==
Just prior to the outbreak of the Second World War, Aitken was called up for service in the RAF. He was involved in a sortie to Borkum, to attack a German seaplane base there, on 27 November 1939. This was No. 601 Squadron's first operation of the war. Otherwise, it was mostly engaged in night patrols from its base at Biggin Hill. It reequipped with Hawker Hurricane fighters in early 1940. On 15 May, Aitken was promoted to flight lieutenant. Aitken became the squadron's commanding officer in June, earning the Distinguished Flying Cross in 1940, and being appointed a Companion of the Distinguished Service Order, in 1942, for eight combat claims. Leaving the squadron on 20 July 1940, he then served as commanding officer of No. 68 Squadron RAF, a night fighter unit, from February 1941 until January 1943, claiming four night victories.

Serving in the Middle East during the middle war years as wing commander, although he was officially non-operational, he managed to shoot down two Junkers Ju 52 aircraft while flying with No. 46 Squadron RAF in Beaufighters.

Aitken became wing leader of the Banff Strike Wing (RAF Coastal Command) in 1944. He reached the rank of group captain, achieving 16 1/2 kills (one a shared aircraft). He did some of his early flying training with Richard Hillary, to whom he was known as Bill, and was featured in Hillary's book The Last Enemy.

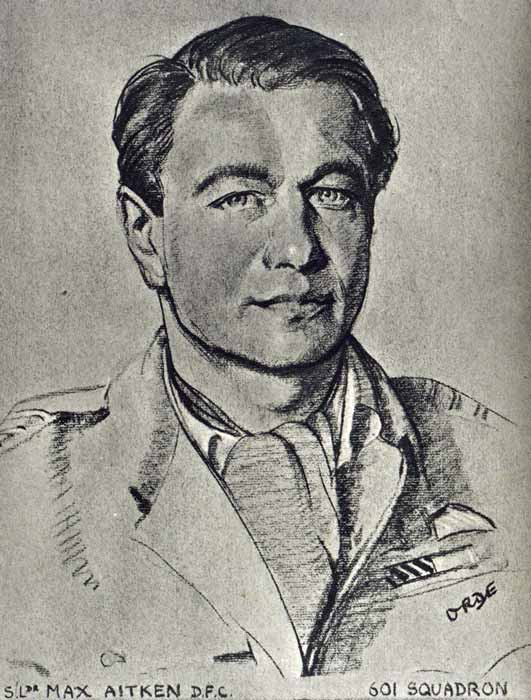
Portrait of Aitken, drawn by the war artist Cuthbert Orde in 1940

== Post-war career ==
In 1946, Aitken entered the family newspaper business, as a director of the Express Group, and later became Chairman of Beaverbrook Newspapers Ltd.

At the 1945 general election, Aitken was elected Conservative Member of Parliament for Holborn with a majority of 925. Unfavourable boundary changes meant that the Labour Party took the successor seat in 1950 comfortably and Aitken did not stand again.

He also served as Chancellor of the University of New Brunswick in Canada and he was succeeded by his third wife.

He appeared in the famous documentary series about World War II, The World at War, giving a variety of interviews, including the fourth episode "Alone."

== Offshore powerboat racing ==
In the late 1950s, Aitken witnessed one of the early Miami Nassau Offshore Powerboat Races, then participated in the following year with his wife, Lady Violet. It was the experience of this new "sport" that led to his announcement at the 1961 London Boat Show of a similar ocean race to be staged in the south of England in August that year.

Together with John Coote they formulated the rules that saw the birth of the Cowes Torquay Offshore Powerboat Race, with the aim of improving the breed of sea-going fast cruisers and safety at sea. The Cowes Torquay will celebrate in 2010 the 50th year since Aitken founded it.

== London International Boat Show ==
Aitken, with the sponsorship of his newspaper the Daily Express, helped to found the London International Boat Show in 1954 at the Empire Hall, Olympia.

== Family life ==
Aitken married three times:

- 1) Cynthia Monteith, daughter of Colonel H. G. Monteith DSO OBE (1939–1944) (divorced)
- 2) Jane Kenyon-Slaney, daughter of Captain Robert Kenyon-Slaney by his wife, Lady Mary Gilmour (1946–1950) (divorced); two daughters (Kirsty and Lynda). Their daughter Kirsty is a close friend of Queen Camilla.
- 3) Violet de Trafford, daughter of Sir Humphrey de Trafford (1951–30 April 1985); a son and a daughter (Maxwell and Laura)

He succeeded his father as Baron Beaverbrook on the latter's death on 9 June 1964, but disclaimed the title three days later on 12 June, stating that "there shall only be one Lord Beaverbrook in my lifetime". On his death in 1985, his son, also Max Aitken, took on the title.

== Bibliography ==
- Bungay, Stephen (2015) [2000]. The Most Dangerous Enemy: A History of the Battle of Britain. London: Aurum Press. ISBN 978-1-84513-650-5.
- Rawlings, John (1976). Fighter Squadrons of the RAF and their Aircraft. London: MacDonald & James. ISBN 0-354-01028-X.
- Stenton, M., Lees, S. (1981). Who's Who of British Members of Parliament, volume iv (covering 1945–1979). Sussex: The Harvester Press; New Jersey: Humanities Press. ISBN 0-391-01087-5

Parliament of the United Kingdom
Preceded by Sir Robert Tasker	Member of Parliament for Holborn; 1945–1950	Constituency abolished
Peerage of the United Kingdom
Preceded by Max Aitken	Baron Beaverbrook; 9–12 June 1964	Disclaimed Title next held by Max Aitken
Baronetage of the United Kingdom
Preceded by Max Aitken	Baronet (of Cherkley); 1964–1985	Succeeded by Max Aitken
