= Violet Aitken (powerboat racer) =

British powerboat racer (1926–2021)

- Detail from photo in Powerboat Racing World
- Born: Violet de Trafford; 17 June 1926; London, England
- Died: 18 February 2021 (aged 94); Lambourn, England
- Education: Owlstone Croft school
- Known for: Powerboat racing
- Children: Two
- Parent: Sir Humphrey de Trafford, 4th Baronet

Violet de Trafford became Lady Violet "Vi" Aitken (17 June 1926 – 18 February 2021) was a British powerboat racer. She became the chancellor of the University of New Brunswick for a decade.

== Life ==
Trafford was born in London in 1926. Her parents were millionaire racehorse owner Sir Humphrey de Trafford, 4th Baronet, and the Hon. Cynthia Hilda Evelyn Cadogan, a daughter of Henry Cadogan, Viscount Chelsea.

She became Sir Max Aitken, 2nd Baronet's third wife on New Year's Day 1951 in Montego Bay, Jamaica.

The sport of powerboat racing began with the Miami-Nassau Race in 1956. It was in Florida in the 1950s that she and her husband discovered the sport. They returned and in 1961 they brought the sport to Europe when the Daily Express sponsored the Cowes-Torquay and other countries followed.

She discovered her own love of speedboat racing by accident. She and her husband had a holiday home in Brixham and they would spend evenings across Tor Bay. Unusually she had to take the boat back to Brixham alone once and en route she discovered her attraction to the powerful boats.

In 1969 The Daily Telegraph sponsored the Round Britain Race. Powerboats competed for two weeks over the 1700 mile route and Aitken came eighth.

She became the first woman to be the chancellor of the University of New Brunswick in 1982 when her husband became ill and he could no longer serve as chancellor. She served for a decade and was called "Vi". The university conferred on her an honorary degree.

Aitken died in 2021 at her home in Lambourn from COVID-19.

== See also ==
- Fiona Gore, Countess of Arran, Scottish powerboat racer
