= Jodie Kidd =

English fashion model, racing driver and television personality

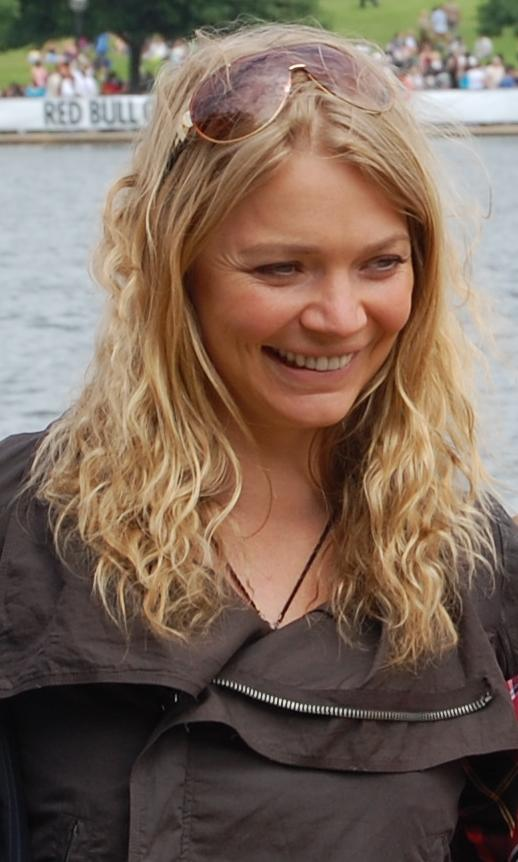
- Kidd in 2008
- Born: Jodie Elizabeth Kidd; 25 September 1978 (age 48); Guildford, Surrey, England
- Occupations: Model; racing driver; television personality
- Spouses: Aidan Butler (m. 2005; div. 2007) David Blakeley (m. 2014; div. 2015)
- Partner: Andrea Vianini (until 2013)
- Children: 1
- Relatives: Jemma Kidd (sister); Max Aitken, 1st Baron Beaverbrook (great-grandfather)
- Modeling information
- Height: 185.5 cm (6 ft 1)

Jodie Elizabeth Kidd (born 25 September 1978) is an English fashion model and television personality.

== Early life ==
Named after Jodie Foster, Kidd was born in 1978 and is the daughter of the businessman and former showjumper Johnny Kidd and his wife Wendy Madeleine, one of the three daughters of Sir John Rowland Hodge, 2nd Baronet, who runs the Holders Festival on Barbados. She is the paternal granddaughter of The Honourable Janet Gladys Aitken whose father was the Canadian press baron Max Aitken, 1st Baron Beaverbrook. Kidd's maternal aunt is the model Vicki Hodge.

Jodie was a showjumper as a child and attended St Michael's School, Burton Park, Petworth, West Sussex. Kidd has two siblings. Her elder sister, Jemma Kidd (born 1974), married Arthur Wellesley, Earl of Mornington, son of the current Duke of Wellington, in June 2005. Kidd's brother, Jack Kidd (born 1973) is a polo player. Kidd also has a half-brother, the entrepreneur Nick D'Arcy Whiting (born 1962), and a half-sister, Debbie Parris (born 1964).

== Career ==
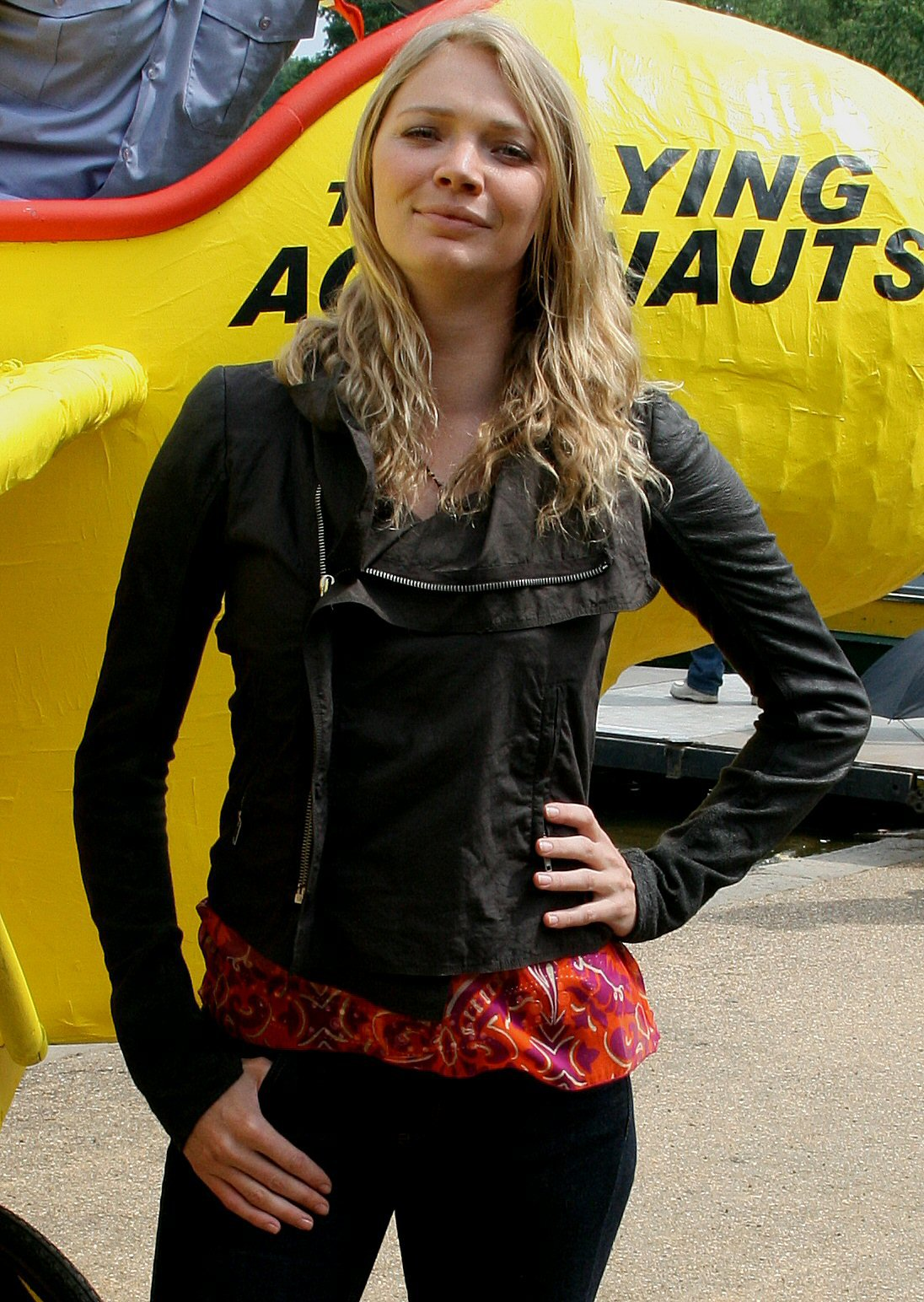
Kidd in London, 2008

=== Modelling ===
Kidd was 15 when she was discovered by photographer Terry O'Neil on a beach in Barbados. Her modelling career began when he introduced her to model agent Laraine Ashton. When Kidd began modelling at the age of 16, there was an uproar; accusations were made that promotion of her slender figure encouraged teenage girls to become anorexic when they tried to mimic her looks. Her skeletal figure led to accusations, because she is tall 185.5 cm (6 ft 1) and at the time her weight was 48 kg (106 lb) (BMI of 13.5; WHO class at 16 years, "severe thinness") and a German magazine called her "locuste model", sometimes referred to as "heroin chic". However, following an eight-month break in modelling, Kidd increased her weight to become a dress size 14.

Kidd, with a face not dissimilar to that of Kate Moss, modelled with the leading models from Capellino, Chanel, Ernesto Esposito, Fendissime, Gai Mattiolo, Ghost, Lagerfeld, Malhas, Monsoon, and Motorola and also featured in campaigns for Chloé 'Innocence' perfume and Yves Saint Laurent. She also appeared on the cover of Elle magazine in Australia, Italy, Portugal, Singapore, Sweden and the United States and made appearances on The Face and Comme des Garçons.

In 2014, Kidd was the face of Jaeger's AW/14 campaign. She was one of three iconic British models who were photographed with their mothers, alongside Jasmine Guinness and Kirsty Hume.

=== Racing ===
She drove a Maserati and became known for completing the fastest Celebrity Lap in the Suzuki Liana on the Top Gear car show (Series 2 Episode 8 : 6 July 2003). She was later beaten by Simon Cowell (Series 3 Episode 5 : 9 November 2003) and is now ranked 11th-fastest.

On 4 December 2004, Kidd and her co-driver, Fabio Babini, took first place in Bologna, Italy at a Maserati Trofeo Pro-Am event. It was only Kidd's third race. She has also taken part in several Gumball 3000 rallies.

Kidd in a Sweet Shop

YouTube information
- Channel: @KiddinaSweetShop
- Years active: 2021–present
- Genre: Automobiles
- Subscribers: 146 thousand
- Views: 16 million
- Last updated: 9 August 2025

=== Television ===
Kidd's career as a television personality has included participation on Strictly Come Dancing 2008, in which she partnered with professional dancer Ian Waite; they finished in sixth place, and Kidd left the show in a "dance-off" against former model and television presenter Lisa Snowdon. In 2014, Kidd was a finalist in the BBC's annual cookery programme Celebrity Masterchef; she lost the championship to actor Sophie Thompson. In 2015 she appeared in series 2 of The Jump, where she was sixth to be eliminated. In 2015 Kidd appeared as one of the hosts of the Channel 5 automotive show The Classic Car Show with co-host Quentin Willson.

In the summer of 2015, Kidd was tipped to become Chris Evans's co-host on the revamped Top Gear following Jeremy Clarkson's exit. However she ruled herself out of the job stating that she wanted some time out of the limelight. Kidd also appeared with her son Indio on the fifth series of Big Star's Little Star where they won £9,000 for charity.

Kidd formed part of the ITV4 presenter line up for the Isle of Man TT coverage of 2018.

=== Musical production ===
Kidd and her father are producers of the musical Yarico, a tale of romance and slavery in Barbados, based on the 17th-century operetta Yarico and Inkle.

== Personal life ==
Kidd's other hobbies include polo, golf and horse riding.

Following a year-long romance and engagement, Kidd married Internet entrepreneur Aidan Butler on 10 September 2005 at St Peter's Church, Twineham, West Sussex. The marriage ended after 18 months.

Kidd's son by her partner Andrea Vianini, an Argentinian polo player, was born on 5 September 2011. Kidd and Vianini's relationship ended in the summer of 2013. Kidd subsequently married Captain David Blakeley. The couple separated in January 2015, after four months of marriage.

== Filmography ==
Year	Title	Role	Notes
1997	Prince Valiant		Uncredited
1999	Mad Cows	Tracey	
2000	The Fast Show	Insecure Girl in Dress	The Last Fast Show Ever - Part 1
2003	Top Gear	Star in a Reasonably Priced Car	Lap time: 1 min 48 seconds (Series 2, episode 8).
2006	Gumball 3000: Drivin' Me Crazy		
2008	Who Do You Think You Are?	Appears as herself to trace her family tree.	
2008	Clarkson: Thriller	Appears as herself to race Jeremy Clarkson in a Fiat 500.	
2010	Countryfile	Presenter in December 2010	
2011	Top Gear	Guest in race – Top Gear UK versus Top Gear Australia – for the Ashes	
2013	Celebrity Antiques Road Trip	Competitor, against James Martin.	Series 3, Episode 14
2014	Celebrity Masterchef	Contestant	
2015	The Classic Car Show	Presenter with Quentin Willson	
2015	The Jump	Contestant	Eliminated, 3 February 2015.
2016	Stars in Their Cars	Guest star	Series 1, Episode 10
2016	Cut N' Dry Talent TV	Girlfriend - Music Video	Episode #3.5
2017	The Crystal Maze	Team captain	Episode 2
2018	Peng Life	Guest	Episode 1
2020	Don't Rock the Boat	Contestant	
2021	Celebrity Yorkshire Auction House	Guest	Series 1 Episode 5
2021–	Kidd in a Sweet Shop	Presenter	Her own Youtube channel
2021	W Series	Village Pub Landlady	2022 Race 4 - Silverstone (United Kingdom)
