= Croft (surname) =

Croft is a surname of English origin; notable people with this surname include:

- Annabel Croft (born 1966), British tennis player
- Chancy Croft (1937–2022), American politician, father of Eric Croft
- Chris Croft, American politician
- Colin Croft (born 1953), Guyanese cricketer
- David Croft (broadcaster) (born 1970), "Crofty", British TV commentator
- David Croft (TV producer) (1922–2011), British TV sitcom writer
- Don Croft (born 1949), American football player
- Douglas Croft (1926–1963), American actor
- Eric Croft (born 1964), American politician, son of Chancy Croft
- Garan Croft (born 2001), Welsh boxer
- Gary Croft (born 1974), English footballer
- George W. Croft (1846–1904), American politician, father of Theodore G. Croft
- Hallard Croft (1936–2025), English mathematician
- Henry Croft (1856–1917), Australian-Canadian businessman
- Herbert Croft (disambiguation), several people
- Henry Page Croft, 1st Baron Croft (1881–1947)
- Ioan Croft (born 2001), Welsh boxer
- James Croft (died 1590), Lord Deputy of Ireland in the sixteenth century
- Jennifer Croft, American translator
- Julia Croft, New Zealand performance artist
- June Croft (born 1963), British freestyle swimmer
- Lee Croft (born 1985), English footballer
- Lee Croft (American football) (1898–1984), American NFL guard
- Mary Jane Croft (1916–1999), American actress
- Paddy Croft (1923–2015), actress
- Peta-Kaye Croft (born 1972), Australian politician
- Richard Croft (tenor), American operatic tenor
- Robert Croft (born 1970), Welsh cricketer
- Robert Croft (diver) (1934–2026), record-setting American US Navy diver
- Sebastian Croft (born 2001), English actor
- Steven Croft (bishop) (born 1957), Bishop of Oxford
- Steven Croft (cricketer) (born 1984), English cricketer
- Sydney Croft (1883–1965), English cricketer
- Teagan Croft (born 2004), Australian actress
- Theodore G. Croft (1874–1920), American politician, son of George W. Croft
- William Croft (1678–1727), English composer
- William Croft (linguist) (born 1956), American linguist

== Fictional characters ==
- Lara Croft, fictional protagonist of the Tomb Raider series

== See also ==
- Croft (disambiguation)
- Crofts (surname)
- Baron Croft, a title in the Peerage of the United Kingdom
- Kroft, surname
