= Senator Croft =

Senator Croft may refer to:

- Chancy Croft (1937–2022), Alaska State Senate
- George W. Croft (1846–1904), South Carolina State Senate
- Theodore G. Croft (1874–1920), South Carolina State Senate
