= Croft =

Croft may refer to:

== Occupations ==
- Croft (land), a small area of land, often with a crofter's dwelling
- Crofting, small-scale food production
- Bleachfield, an open space used for the bleaching of fabric, also called a croft

== Locations ==
=== In the United Kingdom ===
- Croft, Cheshire, in the Borough of Warrington
- Croft, Leicestershire
- Croft, Lincolnshire
- Croft, Herefordshire
  - Croft Castle, Herefordshire
- Croft-on-Tees, North Yorkshire
- Croft (Aberdeenshire castle), a former keep in Scotland
- The Croft, a listed house in Totteridge, Barnet
- Croft Circuit, a motor racing circuit in northeast England

=== In the United States ===
- Croft, California, in El Dorado County
- Croft, Kansas
- Cloudcroft, New Mexico

== People ==
- Croft (surname)
- Crofts (surname)

== See also ==
- Crofts End, Bristol
- Crofton, Cumbria
- Crofton, British Columbia
- Ashcroft (disambiguation)
- Undercroft
