= Crofts (surname) =

Crofts is a surname of English origin. The name refers to:

- Andrew Crofts (born 1953), English writer
- Andrew Crofts (born 1984), Welsh professional footballer
- Charlie Crofts (1943–2024), New Zealand leader of the Ngāi Tahu iwi
- Daniel Webster Crofts (1828–1852), American lawyer, and Mason; founder of the Phi Gamma Delta fraternity
- Daniel W. Crofts, American historian
- Dash Crofts (1938–2026), American musician; half of the 1970s singing duo Seals and Crofts
- Ernest Crofts (1847–1911), English painter
- Freeman Wills Crofts (1879–1957), Irish-English mystery author
- Hayley Crofts (born 1988), New Zealand netball player
- Lewis Crofts (born 1977), English journalist and author
- Marion Crofts (1966–1981), murder victim
- Stella Rebecca Crofts (1898–1964), English artist
- Thomas Crofts (1722–1781), English Anglican priest, bibliophile, and Fellow of the Royal Society
- William Carr Crofts (1846–1894), English lawyer and entrepreneur
- William Crofts, 1st Baron Crofts (birth date unknown, died 1677), English nobleman

== See also ==
- Croft (disambiguation)
- Croft (surname)
