= 1905 Elgin Burghs by-election =

UK parliamentary by-election

The 1905 Elgin Burghs by-election was a Parliamentary by-election held on 8 September 1905. The constituency returned one Member of Parliament (MP) to the House of Commons of the United Kingdom, elected by the first past the post voting system.

== Vacancy ==
Alexander Asher had been Liberal MP for the seat of Elgin Burghs since the 1881 Elgin Burghs by-election. He died on 5 August 1905, causing a by-election.

== Electoral history ==
The seat had been Liberal since the party was founded in 1859. They easily held the seat at the last election, with a comfortable majority;

Alexander Asher

General election 1900: Elgin Burghs Electorate 4,535
Party	Candidate	Votes	%	±%
Liberal	Alexander Asher	1,744	59.5	−2.0
Conservative	John Moffat	1,187	40.5	+2.0
Majority		557	19.0	−4.0
Turnout		2,931	64.6	−3.3
Liberal hold		Swing	-2.0	

== Candidates ==
- On 17 August the local Liberal Association selected 51-year-old John Sutherland as their candidate to defend the seat. He had not stood for Parliament before. He was born in nearby Lossiemouth. He was educated at Aberdeen University. He was a partner in the firm of J & P Sutherland, fish curers of Portsoy.
- The local Conservative Association selected 52-year-old Patrick Rose-Innes as their candidate to gain the seat. He also had not stood for Parliament before. He was born in Aberdeenshire and educated at Aberdeen University. He had been a barrister since 1878.

== Campaign ==
Polling day was fixed for 8 September 1905, 34 days after the death of the previous MP.

== Result ==
There was a large swing of over 11% to the Liberals who comfortably held the seat:

Elgin Burghs by-election, 1905 Electorate 4,748
Party	Candidate	Votes	%	±%
Liberal	John Sutherland	2,474	70.8	+11.3
Conservative	Patrick Rose-Innes	1,021	29.2	−11.3
Majority		1,453	41.6	+22.6
Turnout		3,495	73.6	+9.0
Liberal hold		Swing	+11.3	

The result was the biggest victory that the Liberals had ever had in the constituency.

== Aftermath ==
Sutherland was re-elected at the following General Election. The result was:

General election 1906: Elgin Burghs Electorate 4,867
Party	Candidate	Votes	%	±%
Liberal	John Sutherland	2,742	77.7	+6.9
Conservative	E.N.B. Mackenzie	786	22.3	−6.9
Majority		1,956	55.4	+13.8
Turnout		3,528	72.5	−1.1
Liberal hold		Swing	+6.9	

Rose-Innes was not his opponent and instead contested West Lothian in 1906, the 1907 Jarrow by-election and Middleton in 1910 without success. Sutherland remained as the MP until his death in 1918.
