= Ascroft =

Ascroft is an English surname. Notable people with this name include:

- Eileen Ascroft (1914–1962), journalist and writer
- Harry Ascroft (born 1995), Australian footballer
- John Ascroft (1907–1990), English footballer
- Nick Ascroft (born 1973), New Zealand poet and writer
- Robert Ascroft (1847–1899), English politician

== See also ==
- Ashcroft (disambiguation)
