= Inverurie (Parliament of Scotland constituency) =

Parliament of Scotland constituency

Inverurie in Aberdeenshire was a royal burgh that returned one commissioner to the Parliament of Scotland and to the Convention of Estates.

After the Acts of Union 1707, Banff, Cullen, Elgin, Inverurie and Kintore comprised the Elgin district of burghs, electing one Member of Parliament between them to the House of Commons of Great Britain.

== List of burgh commissioners ==
- 1669–74: James Elphinstone
- 1681–82, 1685–86, 1689 (convention), 1689–93: John Anderson, baillie (declared ineligible 1693)
- 1693–1702: Robert Forbes, advocate
- 1702–07: Sir Robert Forbes of Learnie

== See also ==
- List of constituencies in the Parliament of Scotland at the time of the Union
