= Kintore (Parliament of Scotland constituency) =

Constituency of the Old Parliament of Scotland

Kintore in Aberdeenshire was a royal burgh that returned one commissioner to the Parliament of Scotland and to the Convention of Estates.

The Parliament of Scotland ceased to exist with the Act of Union 1707, and the commissioner for Kintore, Sir George Allardice, was one of those co-opted to represent Scotland in the first Parliament of Great Britain. From the 1708 general election Banff, Cullen, Elgin, Inverurie and Kintore comprised the Elgin district of burghs, electing one Member of Parliament between them.

== List of burgh commissioners ==
- 1579: Mr Thomas Mollison
- 1617: Walter Cheyne
- 1621: John Leslie
- 1661–63: Mr James Keith
- 1667 (convention), 1669–74: Mr William Moir
- 1678 (convention): Adam Pittendreich
- 1681, 1685–86: John Udny of Newtyle and Cultercullen
- 1689 (convention), 1690: Hugh Wallace of Ingliston (declared ineligible 1693)
- 1693–1702: Sir James Scougall of Whitehill
- 1703–07: Sir George Allardice

== See also ==
- List of constituencies in the Parliament of Scotland at the time of the Union
