= Old Aiken Post Office =

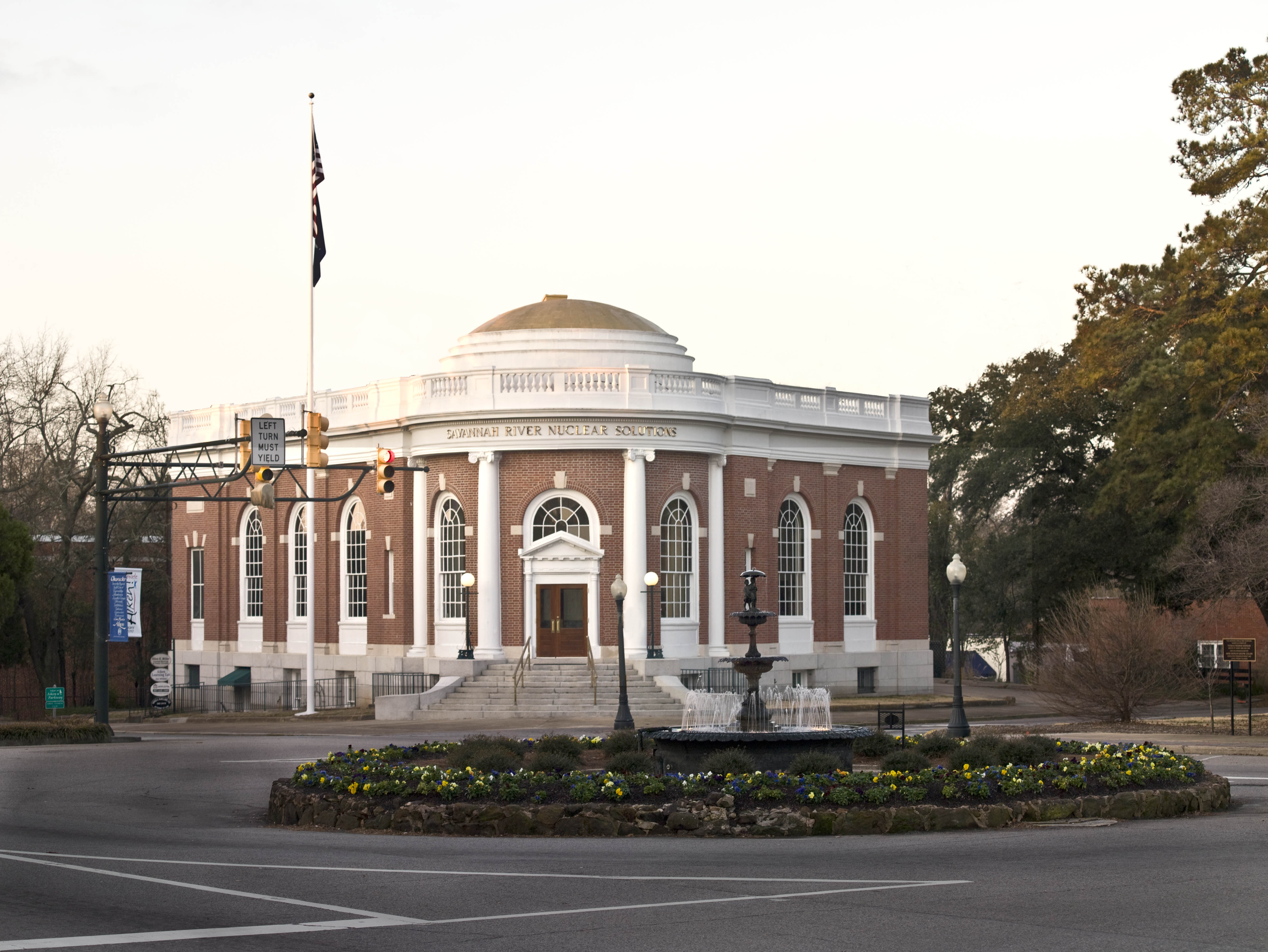
- Old Aiken Post Office exterior, February 7th, 2010

- Location within South Carolina Location within the United States
- 33°33′33.7″N 81°43′26.2″W
- Location: 203 Laurens St. SW, Aiken, South Carolina, 29801

History
- Built: 1912

Site notes
- Architectural style: Jeffersonian
- Owner: Todd Lista

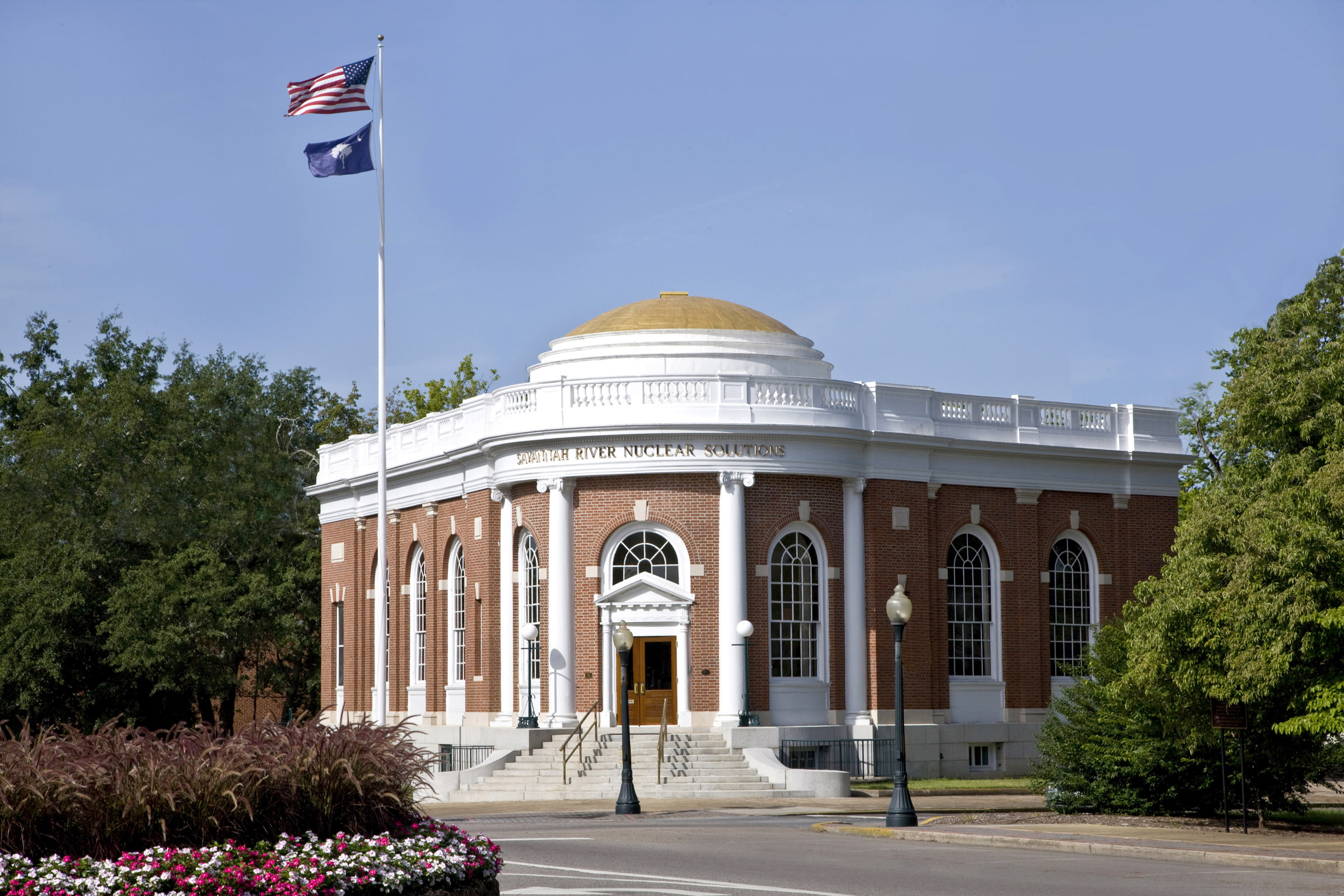
Old Aiken Post Office

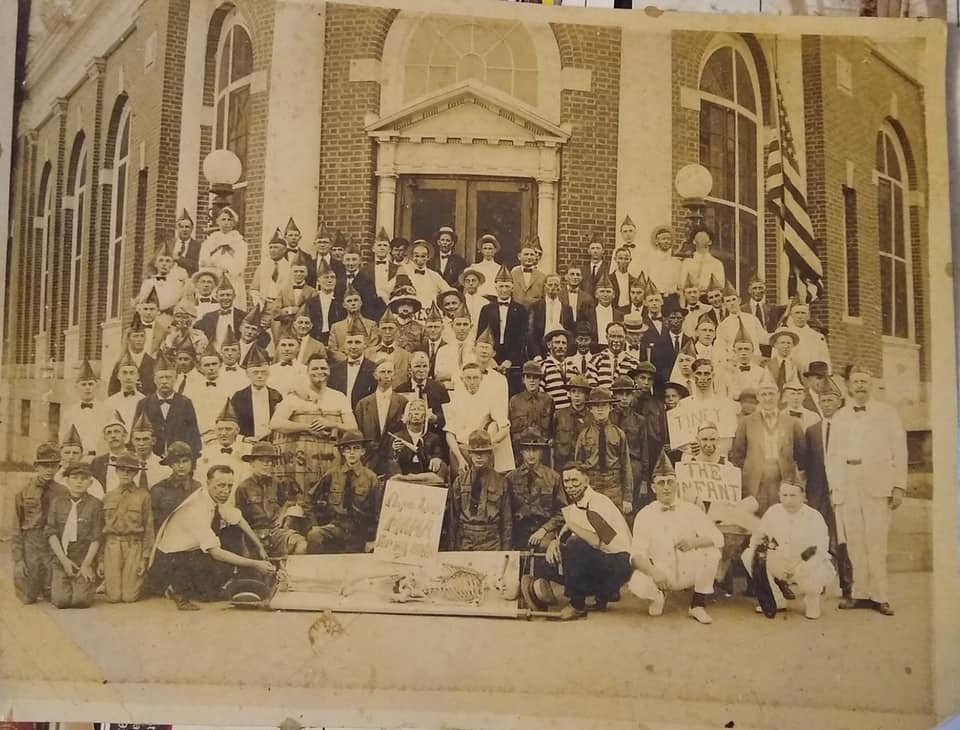
Halloween Group Photo

The Old Aiken Post Office, located in Aiken, South Carolina, is a former United States Post Office and photography studio that now serves as an office building. The first floor of the building has been occupied by Savannah River Nuclear Solutions, LLC since December 2009 following renovations.

The building was originally proposed by U.S. Representative George W. Croft in 1904. After Croft's death, his son, U.S. Representative Theodore G. Croft, continued the project. Over the years, the building has been occupied by numerous politicians, including U.S. Senator Strom Thurmond and South Carolina Senator Tom Young.

== History ==
U.S. Representative George W. Croft originally proposed the idea of building a post office in downtown Aiken in 1904. Upon Croft's death, his son Theodore G. Croft was elected to serve the remainder of his father's congressional term. Theodore Croft continued his father's work on getting the building built, and, with the help of U.S. Representatives J.O. Patterson and his successor James F. Byrnes, he secured $50,000 from the U.S. Congress for the building. Construction began in 1911 and was completed in 1912.
