= William Steuart (Scottish politician) =

Scottish lawyer and Whig politician

William Steuart (25 May 1686 – 13 September 1768) of Seatter, Orkney was a Scottish lawyer and Whig politician who sat in the House of Commons from 1713 to 1741. An agent of the 2nd Duke of Argyll, he pursued Argyll's interests in Parliament and without, and held a succession of public offices.

== Early life ==
Steuart was the only son of Thomas Steuart, commissary and stewart clerk of Orkney, Scotland and his second wife Isobel Young, daughter of Andrew Young of Castle Yards, Orkney. He was educated at King's College, Aberdeen in 1701, becoming an advocate in 1707. He was an agent of the Duke of Argyll and his brother, Lord Ilay and under their patronage he obtained a place as principal clerk of the Scottish Exchequer worth £500 p.a. in 1705. After the Union, the post was abolished by the Act establishing the Scottish exchequer court and he was compensated with a joint post as King's remembrancer of the Scottish Exchequer in 1708 which he held for the rest of his life.

== Career ==
Steuart stood as Court candidate for Tain Burghs at the 1710 British general election but was unsuccessful. At the 1713 British general election he was returned as Member of Parliament for Inverness Burghs. Argyll and Ilay had split with Robert Harley and Steuart's return was a hostile act towards ministerial interests, and a reprisal against the Jacobite former member. Steuart followed the Hanoverian line of his patrons and voted against the expulsion of Richard Steele on 18 March. He voted in favour of extending the schism bill to cover Catholic education on 12 May, and was a teller against a Scottish Tory initiative for the investigation of episcopal revenues in Scotland on 3 July. He was appointed secretary to the Prince of Wales for Scotland in 1714.

At the 1715 British general election Steuart was returned unopposed as MP for Inverness Burghs, but was unsuccessful standing for Orkney and Shetland. He voted with the Government from 1715, except on the motion against Argyll's rival, Lord Cadogan, on 4 June 1717. He was a director of the East India Company from 1716 to 1719. At the 1722 British general election he was returned as MP for Ayr Burghs. In about 1724 Argyll and Ilay quarrelled, and never spoke to each another for many years after. During this time, Steuart acted as a channel of communication between the two brothers. He lost his post to the Prince of Wales when George became King in 1727. At the 1727 British general election, he was returned unopposed as MP for Ayr Burghs and for Elgin Burghs, but chose to sit for Ayr Burghs. He was appointed paymaster of pensions in 1731 and was returned again for Ayr Burghs in the consequential by-election. At the 1734 British general election he was returned unopposed for Elgin Burghs alone. By 1739 he was appointed overseer of the King's swans and was in possession of offices worth £1,400. When Argyll went into opposition in 1739, Steuart continued in support of Ilay. He retired from Parliament at the 1741 British general election.

== Later life and legacy ==
Steuart married Frances Cheyne, the daughter of Dr. George Cheyne of Bath, in 1741, but had no children. He died on 13 September 1768.

Parliament of Great Britain
Preceded by George Mackenzie	Member of Parliament for Inverness Burghs; 1713–1722	Succeeded by Alexander Gordon
Preceded by Duncan Forbes	Member of Parliament for Ayr Burghs; 1722–1734	Succeeded by James Stuart
Preceded by John Campbell	Member of Parliament for Elgin Burghs; 1727	Succeeded by Patrick Campbell
Preceded by Patrick Campbell	Member of Parliament for Elgin Burghs; 1734–1741	Succeeded by Sir James Grant
