= Charles Barrie, 1st Baron Abertay =

Scottish businessman and Liberal Party politician (1875-1940)

Charles Barrie KBE, JP, DL

Member of Parliament for Southampton
- In office 27 October 1931 – 19 January 1940 Serving with William Craven-Ellis
- Preceded by: Ralph Morley; Tommy Lewis
- Succeeded by: William Craven-Ellis; John Reith

Member of Parliament for Banffshire
- In office 14 December 1918 – 29 October 1924
- Preceded by: Walter Waring
- Succeeded by: William Templeton

Member of Parliament for Elgin Burghs
- In office 25 October 1918 – 14 December 1918
- Preceded by: John Sutherland
- Succeeded by: Constituency abolished

Personal details
- Born: Charles Coupar Barrie; 7 June 1875
- Died: 6 December 1940 (aged 65)
- Party: Liberal National (1931–1940)
- Other political affiliations: Liberal Party (Before 1931)
- Spouse: Ethel Broom
- Children: 3
- Parents: Sir Charles Barrie (father); Jane Ann Cathro (mother)
- Education: High School of Dundee; Blairlodge School,

Charles Coupar Barrie, 1st Baron Abertay, KBE, JP, DL (7 June 1875 – 6 December 1940), was a Scottish businessman and Liberal Party and later Liberal National politician in the United Kingdom.

== Background and education ==
Charles Barrie was born in Glasgow, the eldest son of Sir Charles Barrie, Lord Provost of Dundee, and Jane Ann Cathro. He was educated at the High School of Dundee and Blairlodge School, Polmont.

== Political career ==
Barrie served during the First World War in an advisory capacity at the Transport Department of the Admiralty, and latterly in the Ministry of Shipping. He was the Minister of Munitions representative in Paris during the Peace Conference, and was a Member of the Supreme Economic Council. He also served as Chairman of the Navy, Army, and Air Force Institutes and as a Member of the Advisory Council to the General Post Office. He was Liberal Member of Parliament (MP) for Elgin Burghs briefly during 1918, for Banffshire from 1918 to 1924 and later sat for Southampton from 1931 to 1940 as a Liberal National.

Barrie was appointed a Commander of the Order of the British Empire (CBE) in the 1918 Birthday Honours, in recognition of his role as Commercial Adviser to the Naval Assistant at the Ministry of Shipping, and a promoted to Knight Commander of the Order (KBE) in 1921. On 26 June 1940, he was raised to the peerage as Baron Abertay, of Tullybelton in the County of Perth. He also held the Russian Order of St Stanislaus and the Danish Order of the Dannebrog.

== Business career ==
Barrie was also a shipowner and merchant, and held a number of business appointments including as a Director of the London and North Eastern Railway, of the Central Argentine Railway, of the Mercantile Bank of India, of Phoenix Assurance Company, and of Cable and Wireless Ltd.

== Personal life ==
In 1926, at age 51, he married Ethel Broom, only daughter of Sir James Broom, and died at Tullybelton, Perthshire, in 1940, leaving three daughters (June, Rosemary and Caroline). The peerage became extinct upon his death.

Parliament of the United Kingdom
Preceded by John Sutherland	Member of Parliament for Elgin Burghs; 1918–1918	Constituency abolished
Preceded by Walter Waring	Member of Parliament for Banffshire; 1918–1924	Succeeded by William Templeton
Preceded by Ralph Morley; Tommy Lewis	Member of Parliament for Southampton; 1931–1940; With: William Craven-Ellis	Succeeded by William Craven-Ellis; John Reith
Peerage of the United Kingdom
New creation	Baron Abertay; 26 June 1940 – 6 December 1940	Extinct
