= Banff (Parliament of Scotland constituency) =

Constituency of the Old Parliament of Scotland

Banff was a burgh constituency that elected one commissioner to the Parliament of Scotland and to the Convention of Estates.

After the Acts of Union 1707, Banff, Cullen, Elgin, Inverurie and Kintore formed the Elgin district of burghs, returning one member between them to the House of Commons of Great Britain.

== List of burgh commissioners ==
- 1543: Walter Ogilvy
- 1587: Thomas Ogilvy
- 1621: Alexander Craig
- 1628–33: Andrew Baird
- 1630 convention: not represented
- 1639–41: Andrew Baird (until 1641); then Alexander Douglas (in 1641)
- 1643–44 convention: Alexander Douglas
- 1644–47: Alexander Douglas (until 1645); Gilbert Moir (from 1646)
- 1648: Gilbert Moir
- 1649–41: Alexander Douglas
- 1661–63: Patrick Stewart, town clerk
- 1665 convention: Robert Hamilton
- 1667 convention: Walter Sheroun
- 1669–74: William Cumming (until 1672)
- 1678 convention: Thomas Ogilvy
- 1681–82: William Fyfe
- 1685–86: Walter Steuart
- 1689 convention: Walter Steuart, provost
- 1689–1701: Walter Steuart (until his death in 1701);
- 1702, 1703–07: Sir Alexander Ogilvy

== See also ==
- List of constituencies in the Parliament of Scotland at the time of the Union
