= Leith Hall =

Country house in Kennethmont, Aberdeenshire, Scotland

Coordinates: 57°21′22.52″N 2°45′53.11″W

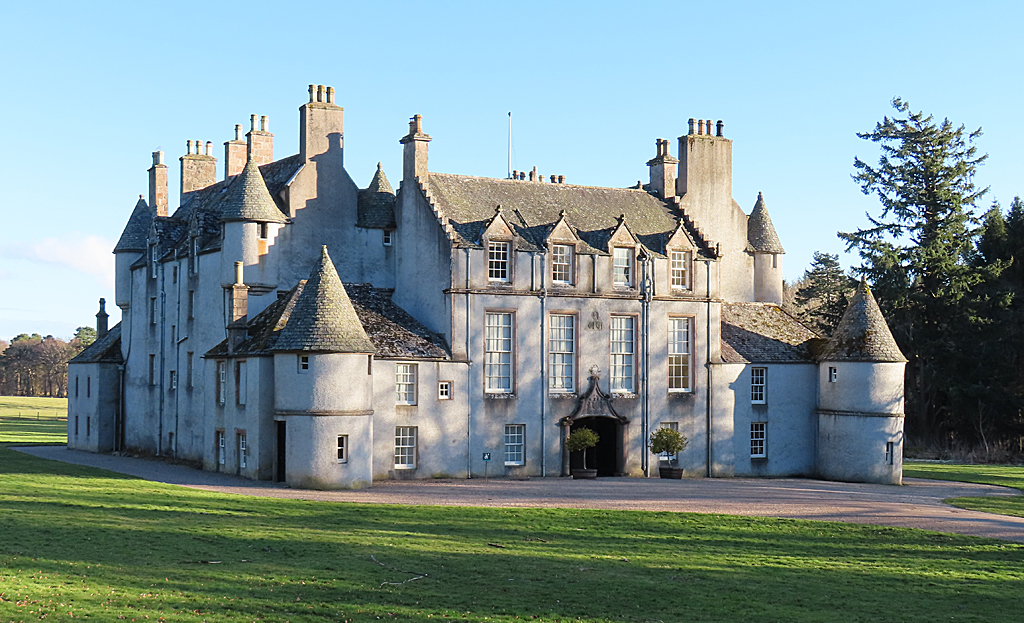
- Leith Hall in 2024
- Interactive map of Leith Hall

Inventory of Gardens and Designed Landscapes in Scotland
- Official name: Leith Hall
- Designated: 1 July 1987
- Reference no.: GDL00258

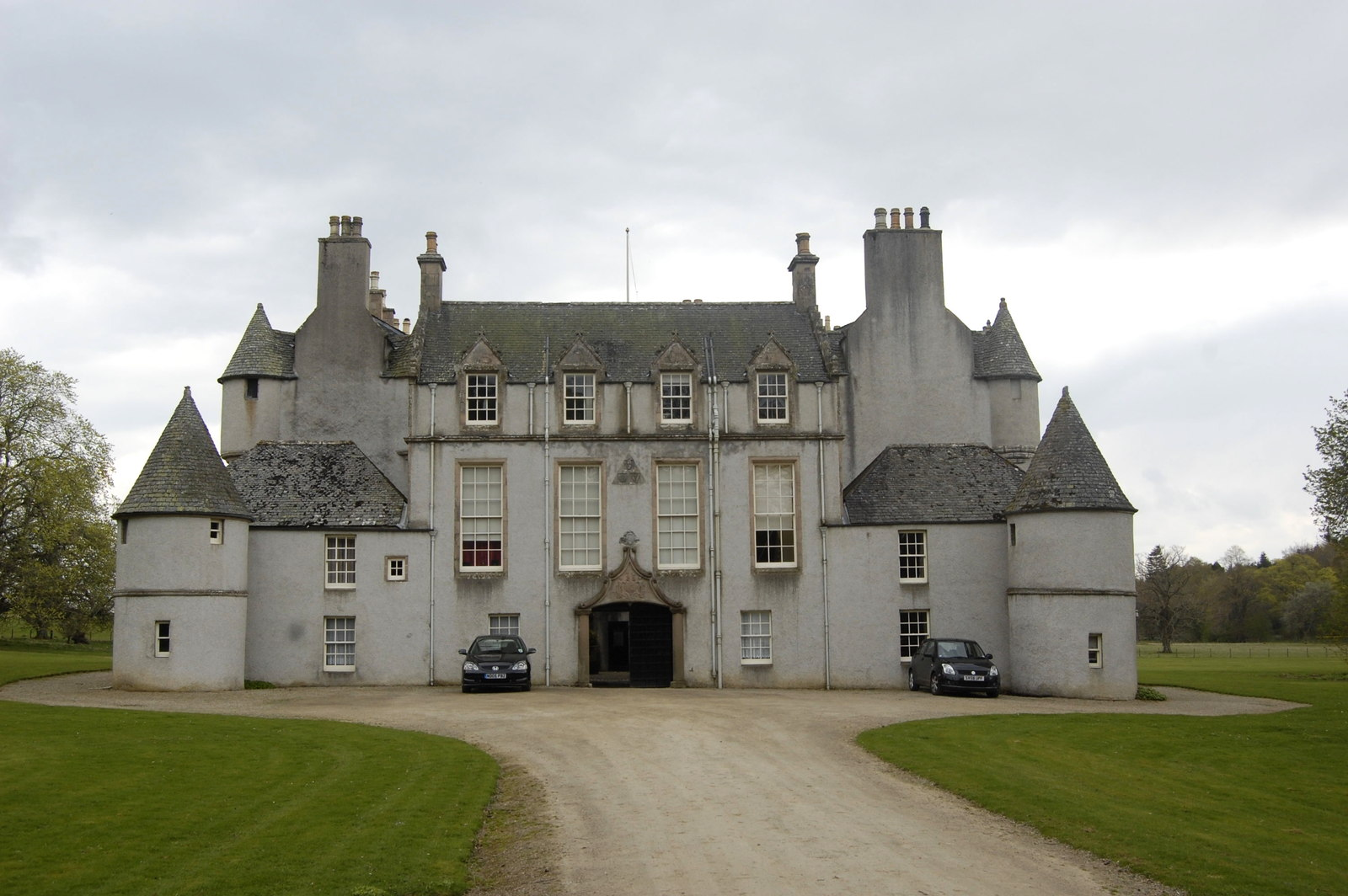
West front of Leith Hall

Leith Hall is a country house in Kennethmont, Aberdeenshire, Scotland. It was built in 1650, on the site of the medieval Peill Castle, and was the home of the Leith-Hay family for nearly three centuries. Since 1945 it has been run by the National Trust of Scotland (NTS). Leith Hall is set in a 286-acre (1.16 km^{2}) estate, with gardens included.

== History ==
The north wing of the house was constructed in 1650, on the site of the earlier Peill Castle, by James Leith of New Leslie (see Castle Croft). The east wing was added in 1756, and the south wing was built in 1797 by General Alexander Leith Hay. The west wing, containing the entrance front, was added in 1868 to complete the courtyard.

In 1745, Andrew Hay of Rannes hid at Leith Hall after the Battle of Culloden where he fought for Bonnie Prince Charlie, later escaping to France.

During the First World War it became a temporary Red Cross hospital and housed over 500 patients. In 1945 the house and grounds were presented to the NTS.

The writer Elizabeth Byrd rented 14 rooms with her second husband, Barrie Gaunt in the 1960s. In The Ghosts in My Life and A Strange and Seeing Time, Byrd describes the paranormal occurrences she and her husband experienced while living here.

The gardens and grounds are open to the public all year round. After several years' closure the Hall was re-opened by the NTS in 2013.

Leith Hall was featured on the paranormal investigation show "Most Haunted" during their third series. The episode aired on Tuesday 28 October 2003 on Living TV.

== Description ==
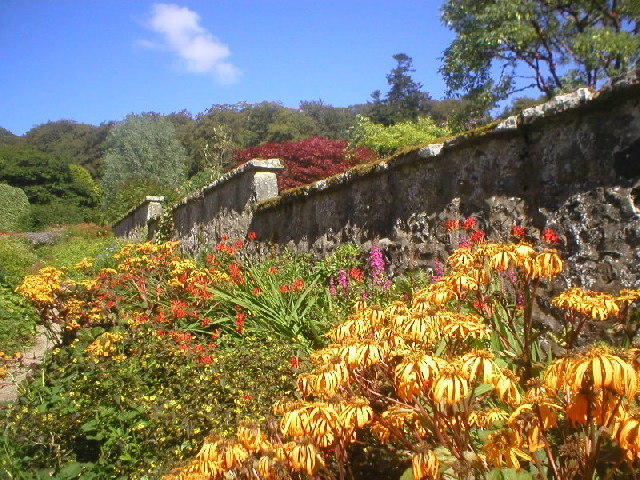
Leith Hall gardens

The house contains fine china, family portraits and tapestries and some interesting clocks. The hall is noted for its gardens, set in stages with each sheltered by a wall or hedge. The gardens contain flowering trees and shrubs, roses, fruit, vegetables and ornamental grasses. A little stream winds its way through the gravel paths and stone crevices and at the top of the garden, near the 18th century curved stables, is the circular "Moon Gate" leading to the old turnpike road, once the main thoroughfare to Aberdeen. There are also two nature trails, each about one and a half to two miles (3 km) long. The gardens also contain two ponds and a birdwatching site.

== Ghostlore ==
In the context of ghostlore, one notable ghost associated with this castle is believed to be that of Laird John Leith III. He was shot in the head after reacting angrily to a fellow diner who accused him of adulterating the grain sold from this hall.

The ghost of John is said to appear in great pain, with a dirty white bandage over his head and covering his eyes. He is often described as wearing dark green trousers and a shirt. In 1968, Novelist Elizabeth Byrd reported waking during the night to see John in highland dress, his head covered in bloody bandages, standing at the foot of the bed. Other apparitional figures have also been sighted at this location.

== See also ==
- James Leith (British Army officer) (1763–1816)
- Andrew Leith Hay (1785–1862)
