= Elizabeth Byrd =

Historical fiction author

- Born: Sarah Elizabeth Evelyn Byrd; December 8, 1912; St. Louis, Missouri, US
- Died: May 11, 1989 (aged 76); Tucson, Arizona, US
- Occupations: Radio writer; editor; literary critic; novelist
- Spouse(s): Don Phares, Barrie Gaunt
- Relatives: Joseph Byrd, Jr. (brother)
- Writing career
- Notable work: Immortal Queen

Elizabeth Byrd (December 8, 1912 – May 11, 1989) was an American author. Her main body of work is historical fiction, and her most successful novel is Immortal Queen, a historical romance about Mary, Queen of Scots. Nine of her thirteen novels were published while she was living in Scotland.

== Early life and education ==
Byrd was born Sarah Elizabeth Evelyn Byrd on December 8, 1912 in St. Louis, Missouri, to Joseph Hunter Byrd and his wife Emma Evangeline Byrd, née Howard. Shortly after she was born, the family moved to New York. Joseph Byrd was a mining prospector and promoter who eventually remarried and settled in Tucson, Arizona. The musician Joseph Hunter Byrd, Jr. is her half-brother, from her father's second marriage.

Byrd claimed to be a descendant, through her father, of John Campbell, 1st Earl of Loudoun.

During 1932–33, Byrd attended writing courses at New York University.

== Early career ==
For nine years, between 1935 and 1944, Byrd was a radio news writer for CBS, then Columbia Broadcasting System. Starting in 1938, she was also a script writer and radio speaker for the New York City radio station WMCA, contributing to the "What's News" broadcasts and husband-and-wife breakfast table chats.

In 1944, Byrd left radio and began a new career path, working until 1950 as an associate editor for New York literary agencies. She established her own literary agency, Betty Byrd Associates, in 1951. This venture appears to have only lasted until 1953, during which time she was also a critic for the A. L. Fierst Literary Agency in New York City. She was the editor for three years of Your Romance, a salacious confession magazine. Before settling down to her eventual career as a novelist, Byrd also wrote jacket copy for the publishing house Julian Messner, Inc. from 1952 to 1960.

Sometime during her early career in New York City, she married Don Phares.

== Writing career ==
Mary Stuart, Queen of Scots, became a figure of great interest to Byrd when she was 7 years old, and learned that her birthday was the same as Mary's, and her mother Emma's birthday was the same as Queen Elizabeth I's. She began collecting biographies on the life of Stuart and wrote a play about her when she was 12. Byrd travelled to Scotland in 1953 and researched Stuart's life further, leading to the writing of Immortal Queen, which was published in 1956 when she was 43 years old. Her first novel, it was also her most successful, being translated into seven languages, and was self-reported as a bestseller, though by which contemporary lists is unknown.

Byrd moved to Scotland c. 1966 and lived there for the following 10 years, publishing nine more works, six of them Europe-based historical fiction. Her first accommodation in Scotland was Leith Hall in Aberdeenshire, where she rented 14 rooms with her second husband, Barrie Gaunt. In The Ghosts in My Life and A Strange and Seeing Time, Byrd describes the paranormal occurrences she and her husband experienced while living there, along with other spectral encounters.

Having tired of the meticulous research she undertook for her historical fiction, Byrd wrote an autobiographical novel in 1975, titled I'll Get By, for which she won the Scottish Arts Council Book Award. She published a sequel to this, It Had to Be You, in 1982.

Byrd returned to the United States in 1976, to Tucson where her family had previously settled. She felt homesick for Edinburgh, however, and returned to Scotland after five years. In total, although labelled an American author, only four of her thirteen novels were published while she lived in the US.

Throughout her adult life, Byrd contributed articles to various serial publications, including Scottish Field, McCall's, Reader's Digest, Esquire, and Collier's.

Byrd died in Tucson on May 11, 1989, at the age of 76.

== Works ==
- Immortal Queen: A Novel of Mary, Queen of Scots (Ballantine, 1956)
- The Flowers of the Forest (Constable, 1962)
- The Ghosts in My Life (Ballantine, 1968)
- A Strange and Seeing Time (R. Hale, 1971)
- The Famished Land: A Novel of the Irish Potato Famine (Lippincott, 1972)
- The Long Enchantment: A Novel of Queen Victoria and John Brown (Macmillan, 1973)
- Rest Without Peace (Macmillan, 1974)
- I'll Get By: An Autobiographical Novel (Macmillan, 1975)
- The Lady of Monkton (Macmillan, 1975)
- The Search for Maggie Hare (Macmillan, 1976)
- Maid of Honour: The Court of Mary Queen of Scots (Macmillan London, 1978)
- The Diamond (Macmillan, 1979)
- It Had to Be You (Viking Children's Books, 1982)
