= February 1940 Southampton by-election =

UK parliamentary by-election

The 1940 Southampton by-election was held on 1 February 1940. The by-election was held due to the elevation to the peerage of the incumbent Liberal National MP, Sir Charles Barrie. It was won by the National candidate Sir John Reith.

By-election, February 1940: Southampton
Party	Candidate	Votes	%	±%
National	John Reith	Unopposed		
National gain from Liberal National				
