= Kroft =

Kroft is a surname. Notable people with the surname include:

- Richard Kroft, Canadian lawyer, businessman and Senator
- Steve Kroft, American journalist
- Tyler Kroft, American football player

== See also ==
- Lana Coc-Kroft, New Zealand television and radio personality
- Wim van der Kroft, Dutch canoeist
- Sid and Marty Krofft, Canadian sibling team of television creators and puppeteers
- Croft (surname)
