= 1918 Elgin Burghs by-election =

UK parliamentary by-election

The 1918 Elgin Burghs by-election was a parliamentary by-election held for the British House of Commons constituency of the Elgin Burghs in the north-east of Scotland on 25 October 1918.

== Vacancy ==
The by-election was caused by the death of the sitting Liberal MP, John Sutherland on 17 August 1918.

== Candidates ==
The Liberals selected Charles Barrie to succeed Sutherland. The Elgin Burghs constituency was due to disappear in boundary changes at the next general election with parts of the seat being redistributed into the seat of Banffshire. Sutherland had been chosen to fight Banffshire come the next election and Barrie inherited the right to contest that seat in due course at the 1918 general election.

Sutherland had represented Elgin Burghs since 1905 and by the time of the December 1910 general election, he was so entrenched in his seat that he was returned unopposed. Sutherland bequeathed Barrie this political dominance. No other candidate came forward to contest the by-election and Barrie was therefore returned unopposed. When the general election came in December 1918, Barrie was also returned unopposed for Banffshire.

== Result ==
Charles Barrie

1918 Elgin Burghs by-election
Party	Candidate	Votes	%	±%
Liberal	Charles Barrie	Unopposed	N/A	N/A
Liberal hold				

== See also ==
- Lists of United Kingdom by-elections
- United Kingdom by-election records
