= Cullen (Parliament of Scotland constituency) =

Constituency of the Old Parliament of Scotland

Cullen in Banffshire was a royal burgh that returned one commissioner to the Parliament of Scotland and to the Convention of Estates.

The Parliament of Scotland ceased to exist with the Act of Union 1707, and the commissioner for Cullen, Patrick Ogilvy, was one of those co-opted to represent Scotland in the first Parliament of Great Britain. From the 1708 general election Banff, Cullen, Elgin, Inverurie and Kintore comprised the Elgin district of burghs, electing one Member of Parliament between them.

== List of burgh commissioners ==
- 1661: George Dunbar
- 1663: George Leslie
- 1665 convention, 1667 convention: not represented
- 1669–72: __ Baird
- 1678 convention, 1685–86: George Leslie, bailie
- 1681–82, 1689 convention, 1689–1695: Sir James Ogilvie of that Ilk (took public office 1696)
- 1696–1702: Sir John Hamilton of Hallcraig
- 1702-1707: Patrick Ogilvy

== See also ==
- List of constituencies in the Parliament of Scotland at the time of the Union
