= John Sutherland (British politician) =

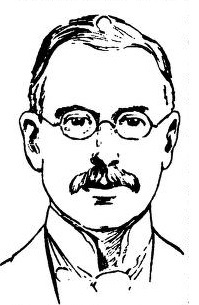

John Ebenezer Sutherland (1854 – 17 August 1918) was a Scottish Liberal Party politician.

== Education and career ==
John Sutherland was born at Lossiemouth. He was educated at Aberdeen University. He was a partner in the firm of J & P Sutherland, fish curers of Portsoy and an expert on fishing industry questions. He served on the Committee on Scottish Sea Fisheries in 1917.

Sutherland was justice of the peace for Banffshire, member of the Banffshire County Council and was for many years Chairman of the Fordyce School Board. He also served as Chairman of the Scottish Temperance and Social Reform Association.

== Parliament ==
=== Elgin Burghs by-election, 1905 ===
In 1905, Sutherland was adopted as Liberal candidate for Elgin Burghs for the by-election which was caused by the death of the sitting Liberal MP, Alexander Asher. He won the by-election in a straight fight with Patrick Rose-Innes, the Unionist candidate by a majority of 1,458 votes.

=== 1905-1918 ===
Sutherland held his seat at the 1906 election and at the January and December 1910 general elections. By the time of the December 1910 election, he was so entrenched in his seat that he faced no opponent and was returned unopposed.

== Death ==
He died at his home, Durn House, Portsoy on 17 August 1918.

Parliament of the United Kingdom
Preceded by Alexander Asher	Member of Parliament for Elgin Burghs; 1905–1918	Succeeded by Charles Coupar Barrie
