= Andrew Leith Hay =

Scottish soldier and politician (1785–1862)

Sir Andrew Leith Hay KH FRS FRSE

Member of Parliament for Elgin Burghs
- In office 1832–1838
- Preceded by: William Gordon-Cumming
- Succeeded by: Fox Maule

Member of Parliament for Elgin Burghs
- In office 1841–1847
- Preceded by: Fox Maule
- Succeeded by: George Skene Duff

Personal details
- Born: 17 February 1785 Aberdeen, Scotland
- Died: 13 October 1862 (aged 77) Leith Hall, Aberdeen, Scotland
- Party: Scottish Whigs
- Parent: Alexander Leith Hay (father)

Sir Andrew Leith Hay of Rannes KH FRS FRSE (17 February 1785 – 13 October 1862) was a Scottish soldier, Whig politician and writer on architecture.

== Biography ==
Andrew Leith Hay was the eldest son of General Alexander Leith Hay of Rannes and Mary Forbes of Ballogie (died 1824), and was born at Aberdeen on 17 February 1785.

He entered the army as an ensign in the 72nd Foot on 8 January 1806, went to the Peninsula in 1808 as aide-de-camp to his uncle, General Sir James Leith, and served through the war until 1814. He was much employed in gaining intelligence, and was present at many of the actions from Corunna to the storming of San Sebastian. Wherever he went he made sketches, and in 1831 worked up these materials into two volumes, entitled A Narrative of the Peninsula War. On General Leith being appointed to the governorship of Barbadoes in 1816, his nephew accompanied him, and discharged the duties of military secretary and also those of assistant quartermaster-general and assistant adjutant-general. As captain in the 2nd Foot he served from 21 November 1817 to 30 September 1819, when he was placed on half-pay.

He had previously been named a knight commander of the order of Charles III of Spain, and a member of the Legion of Honour.

Having retired from the army he turned his attention to politics, took part in the agitation preceding the passing of the Reform Act 1832, and became member for the Elgin burghs on 29 December 1832. Shortly after entering parliament his readiness as a speaker and his acquaintance with military affairs attracted the notice of Lord Melbourne, who conferred on him the lucrative appointment of Clerk of the Ordnance on 19 June 1834, and also appointed him a Knight of the Royal Guelphic Order. He was elected a Fellow of the Royal Society in December 1834.

On 6 February 1838, on being appointed to the governorship of Bermuda, he resigned his seat in parliament. Circumstances, however, arose which prevented him from going to Bermuda, and on 7 July 1841 he was again elected for the Elgin burghs, and continued to sit till 23 July 1847. At the election in the following month he was displaced, nor was he successful when he contested the city of Aberdeen on 10 July 1852.

To county matters he paid much attention, more especially to the affairs of the county of Aberdeen. His most interesting and useful book, entitled The Castellated Architecture of Aberdeenshire, appeared in 1849. The work consists of lithographs of the principal baronial residences in the county, all from sketches by himself; the letterpress, which contains a great amount of information, being also from his pen.

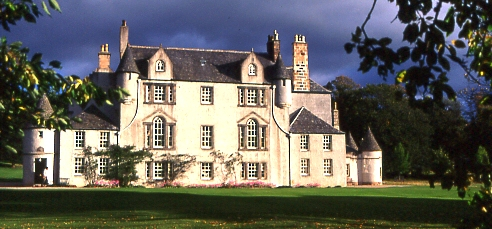
Leith Hall

He died at Leith Hall near Aberdeen on 13 October 1862.

== Publications ==
- Narrative of the Peninsular War (1831)
- Castellated Architecture of Aberdeenshire (1849)

== Family ==
His wife, whom he married in 1816, was Mary Margaret Clark, daughter of William Clark of Buckland House, Devonshire. She died on 28 May 1859. His eldest son, Colonel Alexander Sebastian Leith-Hay (1819–1897), C.B., was well known by his service in the Crimea and India. His younger brother Rear-Admiral John James Leith married Margaret Forbes, daughter of Alexander Forbes of Blackford.

Parliament of the United Kingdom
Preceded by Sir William Gordon-Cumming, Bt	Member for Elgin Burghs; 1832–1838	Succeeded by Fox Maule
Preceded by Fox Maule	Member for Elgin Burghs; 1841–1847	Succeeded by George Skene Duff
Military offices
Preceded by William Leader Maberly	Clerk of the Ordnance; 1834	Succeeded by Sir Edward William Campbell Rich Owen
Preceded by Sir Edward William Campbell Rich Owen	Clerk of the Ordnance; 1835–1838	Succeeded by James Whitley Deans Dundas
