= Patrick Campbell (British Army officer, born 1684) =

Scottish Whig politician and army officer

Lieutenant-General Patrick Campbell (c. 1684 – 18 February 1751), of South Hall, Argyll, also known as Peter Campbell, was a British Army officer, and Scottish Whig politician who sat in the House of Commons between 1722 and 1741.

== Early life ==
Campbell was the second son of Duncan Campbell of Whitestone, Kintyre in Argyll. His mother Barbara was a daughter of Hector McAlester of Loup, Argyll. He was probably educated at Glasgow in 1690. He was an officer in Dutch service from about 1704 to 1708 and became major in 4th (Scots) Horse Guards in 1711, and a lieutenant colonel in 1712. He was appointed gentleman of the buttery in 1721 and retained the post for the rest of his life.

== Career ==
Campbell's family were supporters of the 2nd Duke of Argyll, who arranged his unopposed return at the 1722 British general election as the Member of Parliament (MP) for Buteshire. The seat, whose patron was the county's hereditary sheriff the Earl of Bute, was an alternating constituency with Caithness. Buteshire was not represented in the following Parliament, and Campbell filled a vacancy in the Elgin Burghs at a by election on 16 March 1728.

The Elgin Burghs were dominated by the Earls of Kintore and the Earls of Findlater. Their rival candidates had contested the 1722 result with an election petition which took two years to resolve in favour of John Campbell (1st cousin of the Duke of Argyll, supported by Findlater) over the Jacobite candidate William Fraser. By 1727, the 3rd Earl of Kintore was keen to regain some of the privileges which had been stripped from his father after the latter's support for the 1715 Jacobite rising, and sought to win favour with the Duke of Argyll. He therefore supported Argyll's preferred candidate William Steuart, who was returned unopposed at the 1727 British general election. However, Steuart was also returned for the Ayr Burghs, for which he chose to sit, resulting in the by-election in March 1728 when Campbell was returned unopposed.

Campbell was appointed Lieutenant-Governor of Portsmouth in 1733 and held the post for life. At the 1734 British general election, he was again returned unopposed for Buteshire. He was promoted to brigadier-general in 1735 and major-general in 1739. He followed the Duke of Argyll's Whig politics and voted with the Government until Argyll went into opposition in 1739. Campbell then voted against the Spanish convention. Buteshire was not represented in the next Parliament and he was unable to find a seat at the 1741 British general election. In 1743, he was promoted to Lieutenant-general. He was again unable to obtain a seat at the 1747 British general election, by which time, the 2nd Duke had been succeeded by his rival brother Lord Ilay as 3rd Duke of Argyll.

== Death and legacy ==
Campbell died unmarried on 18 February 1751.

Parliament of Great Britain
Vacant alternating constituency with Caithness Title last held by John Campbell	Member of Parliament for Buteshire; 1722 – 1727	Vacant alternating constituency Title next held by self
Preceded by William Steuart	Member of Parliament for Elgin Burghs; 1728 – 1734	Succeeded by William Steuart
Vacant alternating constituency Title last held by self	Member of Parliament for Buteshire; 1734 – 1741	Vacant alternating constituency Title next held by James Stuart-Mackenzie
Military offices
Preceded by Peter Hawker	Lieutenant-Governor of Portsmouth; 1731 – 1751	Succeeded by John Leighton
