= Marista Leishman =

British author and educator (1932–2019)

The Honourable Marista Leishman
- Born: Marista Muriel Reith; 10 April 1932; Beaconsfield, Buckinghamshire, England
- Died: 3 November 2019 (aged 87)
- Education: St Andrews University
- Spouse: Murray Leishman (m. 1960)
- Children: 4

Marista Muriel Leishman (née Reith; 10 April 1932 – 3 November 2019) was an author and educator. She was the daughter and biographer of John Reith, the first Director-General of the BBC.

== Early life ==
Leishman was born in 1932 in Beaconsfield, Buckinghamshire, the second of two children of Reith and his wife Muriel. Her older brother Christopher declined to inherit the title of Lord Reith from his father. She attended St George's School, Ascot, and the University of St Andrews, Fife, Scotland.

== Career ==
Leishman worked as a fundraiser for the Church of Scotland, supporting efforts to build new churches, writing personally to every minister in the Church of Scotland. She subsequently worked as a project administrator for the National Trust for Scotland, notably for the trust's Georgian House, Charlotte Square, Edinburgh. As manager of the education department, she published booklets and educational material for the National Trust for Scotland and other organisations.

From 1969 to 1975 Leishman served as one of the ruling council members of the influential Edinburgh conservationist group the Cockburn Association.

Among other publications, she wrote a revealing biography of Reith of the BBC: My Father, published in 2006. Speaking at the Edinburgh Book Festival in 1970, she is quoted as saying, "My father was a mix between a thunder god and a spoiled child." Another biography described the life of another ancestor, George Reith, a construction engineer prominent in the development of Clydebank and shipping access to Glasgow.

== Family life ==
Marista Reith married Murray Leishman, a minister in the Church of Scotland, and a founding contributor to the Scottish Institute of Human Relations. Initially, Lord Reith was not happy with her choice of husband, but some years later purchased a family cottage in Duror of Appin, Argyll, for the Leishmans and their four children.
