= Mike Wenstrup =

American politician

Chair of the Alaska Democratic Party
- In office May 8, 2022 – February 10, 2025
- Preceded by: Casey Steinau
- Succeeded by: Eric Croft
- In office January 2013 – January 2016
- Preceded by: Don Gray (acting)
- Succeeded by: Casey Steinau

Personal details
- Born: Cincinnati, Ohio, U.S.
- Party: Democratic
- Spouse: Annie
- Children: 2
- Education: University of Notre Dame (BA, JD)

Mike J. Wenstrup is an American politician serving as the chair of the Alaska Democratic Party. He previously served from 2012 to 2016, stepping down to let Casey Steinau be chair until 2022. Outside of politics, he works as a lawyer.

== Political positions ==
In 2023, Wenstrup supported prosecution against Donald Trump.

Party political offices
Preceded by Don Gray; Acting	Chair of the Alaska Democratic Party; 2013–2016	Succeeded by Casey Steinau
Preceded by Casey Steinau	Chair of the Alaska Democratic Party; 2022–2025	Succeeded by Eric Croft
