= Alexander Asher =

Scottish politician

Alexander Asher Q.C.
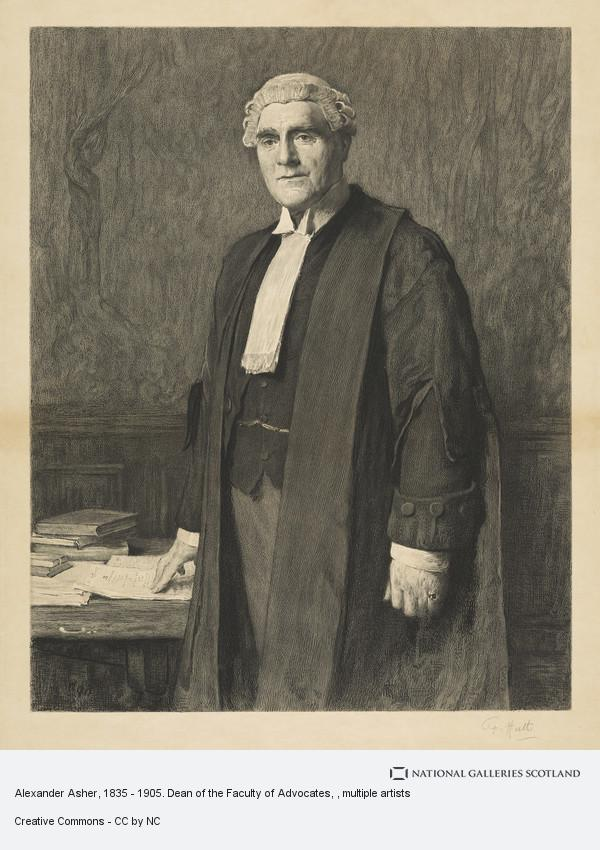

Member of Parliament for Elgin Burghs
- In office 13 July 1881 – 27 January 1905
- Preceded by: M. E. Grant Duff
- Succeeded by: John Sutherland

Personal details
- Born: 27 January 1834 Inveravon, Banffshire
- Died: 5 August 1905 (aged 71) Murrayfield, Edinburgh
- Party: Liberal Party
- Spouse: Caroline Gregan Craufurd
- Parent(s): William Asher, Katherine Forbes Gordon
- Education: University of Aberdeen

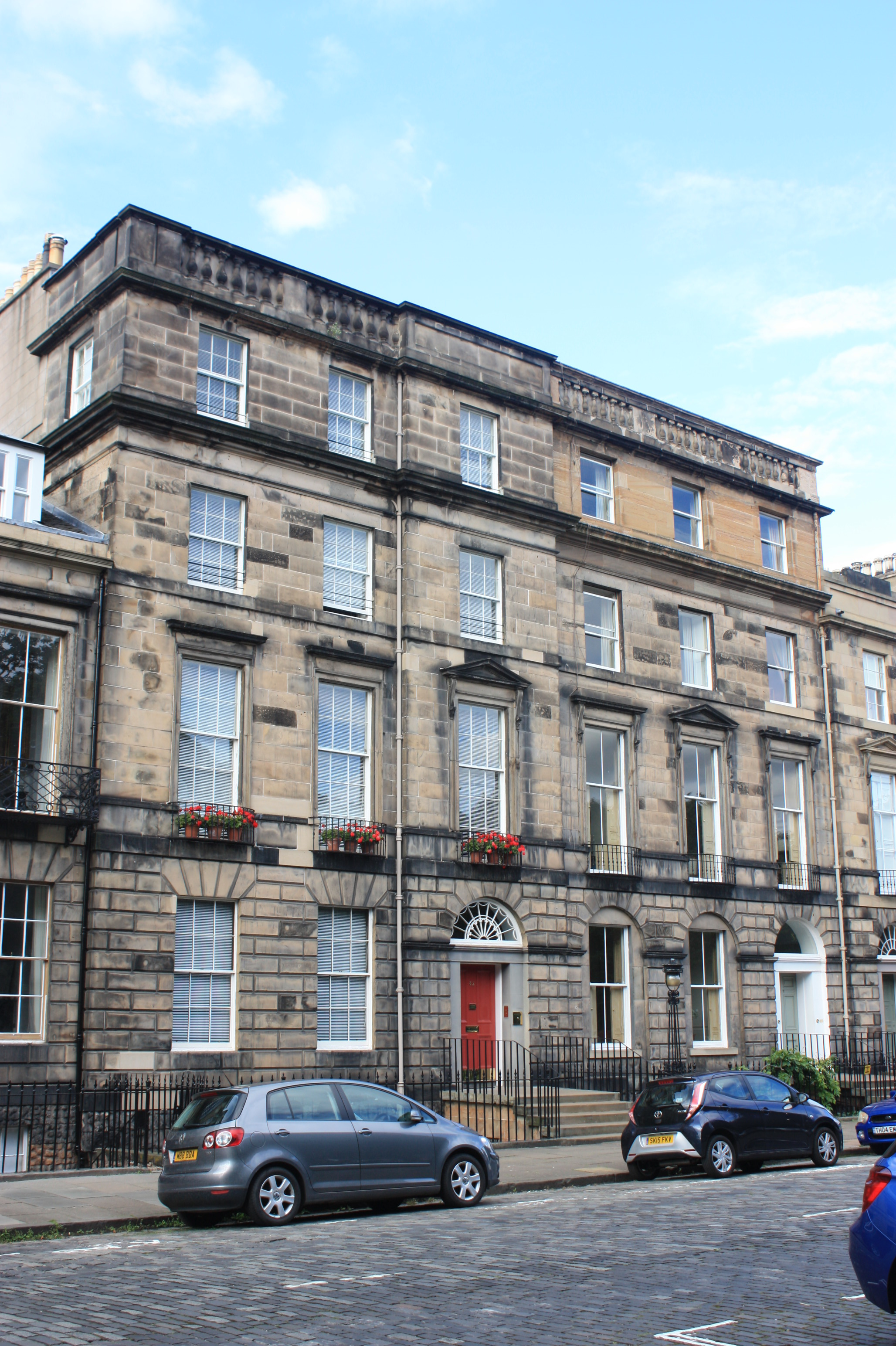
31, 32 Heriot Row, Edinburgh

Alexander Asher (27 January 1834 – 5 August 1905) was a Scottish politician and lawyer, who was elected as Member of Parliament for the Elgin Burghs constituency from 1881 until his death in 1905. He was also Solicitor General for Scotland on three occasions, and was Dean of the Faculty of Advocates.

== Early life ==
Asher was born at Inveravon, Banffshire, on 27 January 1834. He was the third son of William Asher the parish minister of Inveravon and his wife, Katherine Forbes Gordon. He was educated at Elgin Academy and both King's College, Aberdeen and Edinburgh University. He was awarded honorary degrees of LL.D. by Aberdeen and Edinburgh Universities in 1891.

== Legal career ==
Asher was admitted to the Scottish Bar, the Faculty of Advocates in 1861. He was appointed an Advocate Depute in 1870. At this time he was living at 31 Heriot Row, a huge Georgian townhouse in Edinburgh's Second New town.

In December 1881 he took silk, becoming a Queen's Counsel (QC). In 1895, he was unanimously chosen as Dean of the Faculty of Advocates, following the resignation of Charles Pearson when he was appointed as Lord Advocate.

== Political career ==
At the general election of 1880 Asher was unsuccessful as Liberal candidate for the universities of Glasgow and Aberdeen. In 1881, following the resignation of M. E. Grant Duff from the Elgin Burghs constituency, Asher was chosen to represent the Liberal Party at the 1881 Elgin Burghs by-election. He was elected unopposed on 13 July. He immediately took office in the Liberal Government of William Gladstone as Solicitor General for Scotland, serving until 1885. He was elected unopposed at the General Election 1885, at a by-election on 12 February 1886 after re-acceptance of office as Solicitor General for Scotland and again at the General Election 1886. His second spell as Solicitor General being cut short when the Liberals lost power. He stood again at the 1892 United Kingdom general election, and was re-elected, this time opposed, by a majority of 541. After that election the Liberals were returned to power. Asher took office in that government, again as Solicitor General for Scotland, serving for another two years.

Shortly prior to the 1895 general election, Asher was rumoured to be the Government nominee for the position of Speaker of the House of Commons. Although he was not chosen as the Speaker, he retained his seat with a margin of 1,853 votes against the tally of 1,161 won by C.O. Gordon.

There were rumours that the Conservative Party might put forward a candidate to oppose Asher in the 1900 general election. But as of five days before the election, Asher remained unopposed. John Moffat stepped forward shortly before the election on behalf of the Liberal Unionist Party, but was defeated by Asher, 1187 votes to 1744.

== Death ==
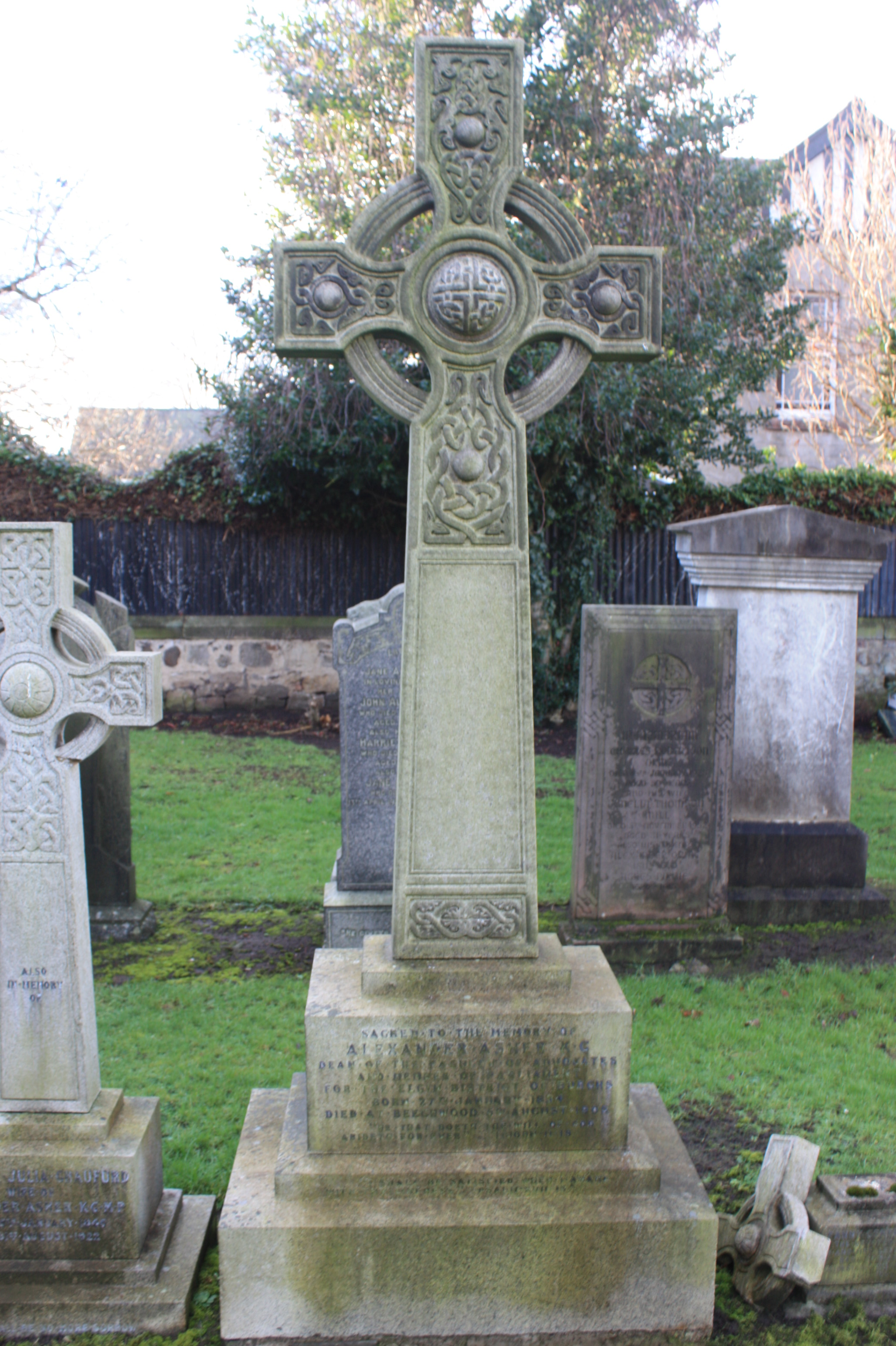
The grave of Sir Alexander Asher, Corstorphine, Edinburgh

Asher fell ill while in London as he was leaving the House of Commons from an evening sitting in July 1905. He remained in bed for the following month, and following a worsening of his condition on 31 July, Asher became eager to return home to Scotland. He returned home to Edinburgh on 4 August where he died at his residence, Beechwood House in Corstorphine, the following day. He is buried in Corstorphine churchyard in the west of the city. The granite Celtic cross marking the grave lies to the west of the church.

At the time of his death, the media described him as "one of the most eminent advocates from the Scottish bar". He left personal estates in the United Kingdom worth £39,378, of which £17,189 was in Scotland. He left no public bequests, but instead granted legacies to a number of his former servants.

== Family ==
In 1870 he married Caroline Julia Gregan Craufurd, the daughter of Rev. C. H. Gregan Craufurd.

Parliament of the United Kingdom
Preceded by M. E. Grant Duff	Member of Parliament for Elgin Burghs; 1881–1905	Succeeded by John Sutherland
Political offices
Legal offices
Preceded by John Balfour	Solicitor General for Scotland; 1881–1885	Succeeded by James Robertson
Preceded by James Robertson	Solicitor General for Scotland; 1886	Succeeded by James Robertson
Preceded by Andrew Murray	Solicitor General for Scotland; 1892–1894	Succeeded by Thomas Shaw
