= Elgin (Parliament of Scotland constituency) =

Parliament of Scotland constituency

Elgin was a burgh constituency that elected one commissioner to the Parliament of Scotland and to the Convention of Estates.

After the Acts of Union 1707, Elgin, Banff, Cullen, Inverurie and Kintore formed the Elgin district of burghs, returning one member between them to the House of Commons of Great Britain.

== List of burgh commissioners ==
- 1661–63: Andrew Leslie, bailie
- 1665 convention: Andrew Young
- 1667 convention: Robert Martins
- 1669–72: James Calder of Muirton
- 1678 convention, 1685–86: David Stewart, baillie
- 1681–82: John Fyffe, councillor
- 1689–1701: James Stewart, dean of guild
- 1702–07: William Sutherland

== See also ==
- List of constituencies in the Parliament of Scotland at the time of the Union
