= George Allardice =

Scottish MP

Sir George Allardice (1672 – 5 October 1709) was a Scottish politician who sat as Burgh Commissioner for Kintore from 1702 to 1707. He was a Member of Parliament and Master of the Mint of Scotland.

He was baptised on 17 August 1672, the second son of Sir John Allardice and Mary, the daughter of John Graham. He was educated at Aberdeen University from 1688 to 1692. His marriage to Anna, the daughter of James Ogilvy, 3rd Earl of Findlater was contracted on 20 October 1692. Anna was 8th in descent from James II of Scotland. They had three sons and five daughters; he is the grandfather of James Lind. He was knighted in 1704. He died of a terminal illness on October 5, 1709.
