= Patrick Ogilvy =

Scottish politician

Hon. Patrick Ogilvy (1665 – 20 Sep 1737) of Cairnbulg and Loanmay, Aberdeen and Inchmartine, Perthshire, was a Scottish politician who sat in the Parliament of Scotland from 1702 to 1707 and as a Whig in the British House of Commons from 1707 to 1710.

Ogilvy was the third son of James Ogilvy, 3rd Earl of Findlater, and his first wife Anne Montgomery, daughter of Hugh Montgomery, 7th Earl of Eglintoun. He was a younger brother of James Ogilvy, 4th Earl of Findlater to whom he owed his military and political careers, being undistinguished on his own account. By 1693, he married Elizabeth Baird widow of Sir Alexander Abercromby, 1st Baronet, of Birkenbog, Banff, and daughter of Sir James Baird of Auchmeddan, Aberdeen. By 1709, he married as his second wife his cousin Elizabeth Montgomerie, the daughter of the Hon. Francis Montgomerie of Giffen.

Ogilvy was a Burgess of Edinburgh in 1696. In 1701 he was Commissioner Justiciary for the Highlands. Also in 1701 he obtained a commission as captain in Brigadier Maitland's regiment. He played little part in his regiment, but took command of an independent force, enforcing customs regulations in western Scotland. In this role he was a repeated embarrassment to the government. In 1702 he was returned as Burgh Commissioner in the Parliament of Scotland for the family burgh of Cullen, serving until 1707. He supported the court consistently and was in favour of the Union. He was a Burgess of Ayr in 1703 and became 2nd lieutenant-colonel on 3 November 1704. By 1706 he was Burgess of Cullen.

After the union, Ogilvy was one of the Scottish representatives to the first Parliament of Great Britain in 1707. He is not known to have spoken in debate, but continued his support for the Court. He was returned unopposed as Member of Parliament for Elgin Burghs at the 1708 British general election. He was relatively inactive in Parliament and his only significant committee appointment was to draft a bill for the encouragement of the fishery, on 16 December 1708. In 1710, he voted for the impeachment of Dr Sacheverell. He did not stand at the 1710 British general election, sold his military commission in 1711 and retired to private life. He sold Loanmay, at Aberdeen, and in 1717 purchased the estate of Inchmartine, Perthshire. In 1724 he was Burgess of Perth.

Ogilvy died on 20 September 1737. He had one daughter by his first wife and three sons by his second wife.

Parliament of Scotland
Preceded by Sir John Hamilton of Hallcraig	Burgh Commissioner for Cullen; 1702–1707	Succeeded by Parliament of Great Britain
Parliament of Great Britain
New parliament	Member of Parliament for Scotland; 1707–1708	Constituency split
New constituency	Member of Parliament for Elgin Burghs; 1708–1710	Succeeded by Sir Alexander Reid
