= George Skene Duff =

Scottish politician

George Skene Duff (13 September 1816 – 12 March 1889) was a Scottish politician, the son of Sir Alexander Duff.

He served as member of parliament (MP) for Elgin Burghs from 1847 to 1857. He was the younger brother of James Duff, 5th Earl Fife, who sat in Parliament at the same time, representing Banffshire. He was Lord Lieutenant of Elginshire from 1856 until 1872.

Parliament of the United Kingdom
Preceded by Sir Andrew Leith Hay	Member of Parliament for Elgin Burghs; 1847–1857	Succeeded by M. E. Grant Duff
Honorary titles
Preceded by James Duff	Lord Lieutenant of Elginshire; 1856–1872	Succeeded by Viscount Macduff
