= Sir Alexander Reid, 2nd Baronet =

Scottish politician

Sir Alexander Reid, 2nd Baronet (died 5 March 1750) was a Scottish laird and politician from Aberdeenshire. He sat in the House of Commons of Great Britain from 1710 to 1713.

Reid was the oldest son of Sir John Reid, 1st Baronet, of Barra in Aberdeenshire. His mother Marion was a daughter of John Abercromby of Glassaugh, Banffshire. He was educated from 1698 to 1702 at Marischal College of Aberdeen University, and in 1705 he married Agnes Ogily, daughter of Hon. Sir Alexander Ogilvy, 1st Baronet, of Forglen, Banff. They had two sons, one of whom died before his parents.

Reid became a burgess of Kintore by 1710, and he was Kintore's commissioner at the 1710 general election. He used his position to vote for himself as Member of Parliament (MP) for Elgin Burghs in the interest of Lord Seafield.

By the next election, in 1713, Seafield's influence in the Elgin Burghs had waned, and Reid was defeated by James Murray, a Jacobite. He also contested Aberdeenshire, where he was also defeated in an acrimonious contest by Sir Alexander Cumming, Bt. He never stood for Parliament again, despite reports of him planning to put himself forward for various seats.

His father Sir John died some time after 1722, and Alexander then succeeded to the baronetcy.

Parliament of Great Britain
Preceded by Patrick Ogilvy	Member of Parliament for Elgin Burghs; 1710–1713	Succeeded by James Murray
Baronetage of Nova Scotia
Preceded by John Reid	Baronet (of Barra) after 1722 – 1750	Succeeded by James Reid
