= Baron Reith =

Barony in the Peerage of the United Kingdom

Barony of Reith
- Or, a cross engrailed sable, between four mullets gules, on a chief of the last a lion passant of the field
- Creation date: 21 October 1940
- Created by: King George VI
- Peerage: Peerage of the United Kingdom
- First holder: Sir John Reith
- Present holder: James Reith, 3rd Baron Reith
- Heir apparent: Hon. Harry Reith
- Status: Extant
- Motto: Quaecunque ("Whatsoever")

Baron Reith /ˈriːθ/, of Stonehaven in the County of Kincardine, is a title in the Peerage of the United Kingdom. It was created in 1940 for Sir John Reith, the first Director-General of the BBC. His only son, the second Baron, disclaimed the peerage for life in 1972. Since 2016, the title is held by the latter's son, the third Baron.

== Barons Reith (1940) ==
- John Charles Walsham Reith, 1st Baron Reith (1889–1971)
- Christopher John Reith, 2nd Baron Reith (1928–2016) (disclaimed 1972)
- James Harry John Reith, 3rd Baron Reith (b. 1971)

The heir apparent is the present holder's son, Hon. Harry Joseph Reith (b. 2006)
