= Elgin Burghs =

Parliamentary constituency in the United Kingdom, 1801–1918

- Former district of burghs constituency for the House of Commons

1708–1918
- Seats: One
- Created from: Banff, Cullen, Elgin, Inverurie and Kintore
- Replaced by: Kincardine and Aberdeenshire East, Banffshire, Moray and Nairn and Kincardine and Aberdeenshire West,

Elgin Burghs was a district of burghs constituency of the House of Commons of Great Britain from 1708 to 1801 and of the House of Commons of the United Kingdom from 1801 to 1918. Until 1832, when Peterhead was added, the constituency comprised the parliamentary burghs of Elgin, Cullen, Banff, Inverurie and Kintore, lying in Elginshire (later known as Morayshire), Banffshire and Aberdeenshire.

== Creation ==
The British parliamentary constituency was created in 1708 following the Acts of Union, 1707 and replaced the former Parliament of Scotland burgh constituencies of Elgin, Banff, Cullen, Inverurie and Kintore.

== History ==
The constituency elected one Member of Parliament (MP) by the first past the post system until the seat was abolished in 1918.

In 1918, Elgin became part of Moray and Nairn, Banff and Cullen part of Banffshire, Inverurie and Kintore part of Central Aberdeenshire and Peterhead part of East Aberdeenshire.

== Members of Parliament ==
Election	Member	Party
1708	Hon. Patrick Ogilvy	
1710	Alexander Reid	
1713	James Murray	Tory
1715	John Campbell, later Duke of Argyll	Whig
1722	William Fraser	Tory
1725	John Campbell, later Duke of Argyll	
1727	William Steuart	
1728	Patrick Campbell	
1734	William Steuart	
1741	Sir James Grant, Bt	
1747	William Grant	
1755	Sir Andrew Mitchell	
1771	Thomas Lockhart	
1774	Staats Long Morris	
1784	William Adam	
1790	Alexander Brodie	
1802	Francis Ogilvy-Grant, later Earl of Seafield	
1806	George Skene	
1807	Archibald Colquhoun	
1810	William Dundas	Tory
1812	Archibald Campbell	Tory
1812	Patrick Milne	Tory
1818	Robert Grant	Tory
1820	Archibald Farquharson	Whig
1826	Alexander Duff	
1830	Alexander Duff	Tory
1831	Sir William Gordon-Cumming, Bt	Tory
1832	Sir Andrew Leith Hay	Whig
1838	Fox Maule, later Earl of Dalhousie	Whig
1841	Sir Andrew Leith Hay	Whig
1847	George Skene Duff	Whig
1857	M. E. Grant Duff	Whig
1859	M. E. Grant Duff	Liberal
1881 by-election	Alexander Asher	Liberal
1905 by-election	John Sutherland	Liberal
1918 by-election	Charles Barrie, later Baron Abertay	Liberal
1918	constituency abolished	

== Election results ==
=== Elections in the 1830s ===
General election 1830: Elgin Burghs
Party	Candidate	Votes	%
Tory	Alexander Duff	Unopposed	
Registered electors		c. 84	
Tory hold			

General election 1831: Elgin Burghs
Party	Candidate	Votes	%
Tory	William Gordon-Cumming	Unopposed	
Registered electors		c. 84	
Tory hold			

General election 1832: Elgin Burghs
Party	Candidate	Votes	%
Whig	Andrew Leith Hay	350	50.1
Tory	Holt Mackenzie	225	32.2
Whig	Alexander Morison	123	17.6
Majority		125	17.9
Turnout		698	89.9
Registered electors		776	
Whig gain from Tory			

Hay was appointed as Clerk of the Ordnance, requiring a by-election.

By-election, 30 June 1834: Elgin Burghs
Party	Candidate	Votes	%
Whig	Andrew Leith Hay	Unopposed	
Whig hold			

General election 1835: Elgin Burghs
Party	Candidate	Votes	%	±%
Whig	Andrew Leith Hay	384	59.3	−8.4
Conservative	William Brodie	264	40.7	+8.5
Majority		120	18.6	+0.7
Turnout		648	79.8	−10.1
Registered electors		812		
Whig hold		Swing	+0.4	

Hay was appointed as Clerk of the Ordnance, requiring a by-election.

By-election, 2 May 1835: Elgin Burghs
Party	Candidate	Votes	%
Whig	Andrew Leith Hay	Unopposed	
Whig hold			

General election 1837: Elgin Burghs
Party	Candidate	Votes	%
Whig	Andrew Leith Hay	Unopposed	
Registered electors		858	
Whig hold			

Hay resigned after being appointed as Governor of Bermuda, causing a by-election.

By-election, 13 February 1838: Elgin Burghs
Party	Candidate	Votes	%
Whig	Fox Maule	Unopposed	
Whig hold			

=== Elections in the 1840s ===
General election 1841: Elgin Burghs
Party	Candidate	Votes	%	±%
Whig	Andrew Leith Hay	311	51.2	N/A
Conservative	Thomas Abercromby Duff	297	48.8	New
Majority		14	2.4	N/A
Turnout		608	70.9	N/A
Registered electors		857		
Whig hold		Swing	N/A	

General election 1847: Elgin Burghs
Party	Candidate	Votes	%	±%
Whig	George Skene Duff	242	41.7	N/A
Conservative	Alexander Bannerman	192	33.0	−15.8
Whig	Andrew Leith Hay	147	25.3	−25.9
Majority		50	8.7	+6.3
Turnout		581	67.4	−3.5
Registered electors		862		
Whig hold		Swing		

=== Elections in the 1850s ===
General election 1852: Elgin Burghs
Party	Candidate	Votes	%	±%
Whig	George Skene Duff	Unopposed		
Registered electors		988		
Whig hold				

General election 1857: Elgin Burghs
Party	Candidate	Votes	%	±%
Whig	George Skene Duff	Unopposed		
Registered electors		967		
Whig hold				

Duff resigned by accepting the office of Steward of the Chiltern Hundreds, causing a by-election.

By-election, 19 December 1857: Elgin Burghs
Party	Candidate	Votes	%	±%
Whig	M. E. Grant Duff	Unopposed		
Whig hold				

General election 1859: Elgin Burghs
Party	Candidate	Votes	%	±%
Liberal	M. E. Grant Duff	Unopposed		
Registered electors		969		
Liberal hold				

=== Elections in the 1860s ===
General election 1865: Elgin Burghs
Party	Candidate	Votes	%	±%
Liberal	M. E. Grant Duff	Unopposed		
Registered electors		1,059		
Liberal hold				

General election 1868: Elgin Burghs
Party	Candidate	Votes	%	±%
Liberal	M. E. Grant Duff	Unopposed		
Registered electors		2,962		
Liberal hold				

=== Elections in the 1870s ===
General election 1874: Elgin Burghs
Party	Candidate	Votes	%	±%
Liberal	M. E. Grant Duff	Unopposed		
Registered electors		3,501		
Liberal hold				

=== Elections in the 1880s ===
General election 1880: Elgin Burghs
Party	Candidate	Votes	%	±%
Liberal	M. E. Grant Duff	2,082	73.2	N/A
Conservative	James Mackenzie Maclean	764	26.8	New
Majority		1,318	46.4	N/A
Turnout		2,846	74.8	N/A
Registered electors		3,806		
Liberal hold		Swing	N/A	

Duff resigned after being appointed Governor of Madras, causing a by-election.

By-election, 15 Jul 1881: Elgin Burghs
Party	Candidate	Votes	%	±%
Liberal	Alexander Asher	Unopposed		
Liberal hold				

Asher was appointed as Solicitor General for Scotland, requiring a by-election.

By-election, 27 Aug 1881: Elgin Burghs
Party	Candidate	Votes	%	±%
Liberal	Alexander Asher	Unopposed		
Liberal hold				

General election 1885: Elgin Burghs
Party	Candidate	Votes	%	±%
Liberal	Alexander Asher	Unopposed		
Liberal hold				

Asher was re-appointed as Solicitor General for Scotland, requiring a by-election.

By-election, 12 Feb 1886: Elgin Burghs
Party	Candidate	Votes	%	±%
Liberal	Alexander Asher	Unopposed		
Liberal hold				

General election 1886: Elgin Burghs
Party	Candidate	Votes	%	±%
Liberal	Alexander Asher	Unopposed		
Liberal hold				

=== Elections in the 1890s ===
Alexander Asher

General election 1892: Elgin Burghs
Party	Candidate	Votes	%	±%
Liberal	Alexander Asher	1,668	59.7	N/A
Conservative	James Augustus Grant	1,127	40.3	New
Majority		541	19.4	N/A
Turnout		2,795	66.8	N/A
Registered electors		4,182		
Liberal hold		Swing	N/A	

Asher is appointed Solicitor General for Scotland, requiring a by-election.

By-election, 1892: Elgin Burghs
Party	Candidate	Votes	%	±%
Liberal	Alexander Asher	Unopposed		
Liberal hold				

General election 1895: Elgin Burghs
Party	Candidate	Votes	%	±%
Liberal	Alexander Asher	1,853	61.5	+1.8
Liberal Unionist	Charles Thomas Gordon	1,161	38.5	−1.8
Majority		692	23.0	+3.6
Turnout		3,014	67.9	+1.1
Registered electors		4,440		
Liberal hold		Swing	+1.8	

=== Elections in the 1900s ===
General election 1900: Elgin Burghs
Party	Candidate	Votes	%	±%
Liberal	Alexander Asher	1,744	59.5	−2.0
Conservative	John Moffatt	1,187	40.5	+2.0
Majority		557	19.0	−4.0
Turnout		2,931	64.6	−3.3
Registered electors		4,535		
Liberal hold		Swing	−2.0	

Elgin Burghs by-election, 1905
Party	Candidate	Votes	%	±%
Liberal	John Sutherland	2,474	70.8	+11.3
Conservative	Patrick Rose-Innes	1,021	29.2	−11.3
Majority		1,453	41.6	+22.6
Turnout		3,495	73.6	+9.0
Registered electors		4,748		
Liberal hold		Swing	+11.3	

General election 1906: Elgin Burghs
Party	Candidate	Votes	%	±%
Liberal	John Sutherland	2,742	77.7	+18.2
Conservative	Evan N B Mackenzie	786	22.3	−18.2
Majority		1,956	55.4	+36.4
Turnout		3,528	72.5	+7.9
Registered electors		4,867		
Liberal hold		Swing	+18.2	

=== Elections in the 1910s ===
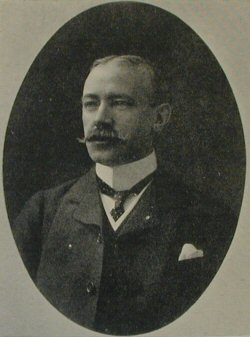
W.G. Black

General election January 1910: Elgin Burghs
Party	Candidate	Votes	%	±%
Liberal	John Sutherland	3,031	71.6	−6.1
Liberal Unionist	William George Black	1,201	28.4	+6.1
Majority		1,830	43.2	−12.2
Turnout		4,232	79.8	+7.3
Liberal hold		Swing	-6.1	

General election December 1910: Elgin Burghs
Party	Candidate	Votes	%	±%
Liberal	John Sutherland	Unopposed		
Liberal hold				

Charles Barrie

Elgin Burghs by-election, 1918
Party	Candidate	Votes	%	±%
Liberal	Charles Barrie	Unopposed		
Liberal hold				

== See also ==
- Elgin Burghs by-election, 1918
