= Herbert Croft =

Herbert Croft may refer to:

- Herbert Croft (bishop) (1603–1691), English churchman
- Sir Herbert Croft, 1st Baronet (c. 1651–1720), English Member of Parliament
- Sir Herbert Croft, 5th Baronet (1751–1816), British author
- Sir Herbert Croft, 9th Baronet (1838–1902), British Member of Parliament
- Sir Herbert Croft, 10th Baronet (1868–1915), of the Croft baronets
- Sir Herbert Croft (died 1629) (1565–1629), English politician who sat in the House of Commons at various times between 1589 and 1614
