= Eric Croft =

American politician (born 1964)

Chair of the Alaska Democratic Party
- Incumbent
- Assumed office February 10, 2025
- Preceded by: Mike Wenstrup

Personal details
- Born: November 6, 1964 (age 61) Anchorage, Alaska, U.S.
- Party: Democratic
- Relatives: Chancy Croft (father)
- Education: Stanford University (BS); University of California, Hastings (JD)

Eric Chancy Croft (born November 6, 1964) is an American attorney and politician who represented Anchorage's West district on the Anchorage Assembly from 2016 to 2019. From 1997 to 2006, Croft served as a member of the Alaska House of Representatives for District 15, representing Spenard, Anchorage. He was also a candidate in the 2006 Alaska gubernatorial election. He received 23.1% of the vote, losing to 68.6% achieved by former governor Tony Knowles. Croft served as Anchorage's school board president from 2013 to 2016. In April 2016, he was elected to the Anchorage Assembly, replacing Ernie Hall, who decided not to run for reelection. In December 2019, he filed papers to run in the 2021 Anchorage mayoral election, before dropping out in November 2020. On February 10, 2025, it was announced Croft had been elected chair of the Alaska Democratic Party.

== Early life and education ==
Eric Chancy Croft was born in Anchorage, Alaska, on November 6, 1964. His parents, Toni (née Williamson) and Chancy Croft, moved to Alaska in 1962, having previously resided within West Texas. Croft's father served in the Alaska Legislature and was the Democratic candidate in the 1978 Alaska gubernatorial election. His maternal grandfather, John Conwell Williamson (1912 – 2001), was a wildcatter in West Texas, who contributed to uncovering oil in both Texas and New Mexico.

Croft grew up in the South Addition neighborhood adjacent to downtown Anchorage, graduating from West Anchorage High School in 1982. He went on to Stanford University, earning an undergraduate degree in electrical engineering. He then received a J.D. degree from University of California, Hastings College of the Law in San Francisco.

== Career ==
Croft was first elected to the Alaska House in 1996, four years after graduating law school, and was reelected four times, facing generally nominal opposition in his Democratic Anchorage district. He is a lifetime member of the National Rifle Association of America and received both the 2003 NRA Defender of Freedom and Gun Rights Legislator of the Year awards. He is a strong supporter in Alaska's initiative process as well as a strong proponent of the prospective Alaska natural gas pipeline. A strong supporter of gender parity, he is "pro-choice," supporting a woman's right to privacy regarding her procreative rights but subject to the right to life of a viable fetus.

He announced his candidacy for governor in 2006 focusing on natural resource issues and that Alaskans get their "fair share" of the state's resource wealth.

He joined with future governor Sarah Palin to lodge an ethics complaint against Alaska Attorney General Gregg Renkes, who later resigned from his office.

In December 2019, Croft filed a letter of intent with the state to run in the 2021 Anchorage mayoral election. He dropped out in November of 2020, citing the presence of multiple ideologically similar candidates to himself.

In 2025, Croft succeeded Mike Wenstrup as chair of the Alaska Democratic Party.

=== Electoral history ===
- 2006 race for governor, primary
  - Tony Knowles (D), 68.6%
  - Eric Croft (D), 23.1%

== Personal life ==
Croft works as an attorney in Alaska. He and his wife, Joanna Burke Croft, own Alaska Professional Testing, Inc. Joanna Croft, an architect by training, is also an alumnus of Stanford University.

Party political offices
Preceded by Mike Wenstrup	Chair of the Alaska Democratic Party; 2025–present	Incumbent
