= The Croft =

House in Totteridge, London Borough of Barnet, England

Coordinates: 51.6274°N 0.1958°W

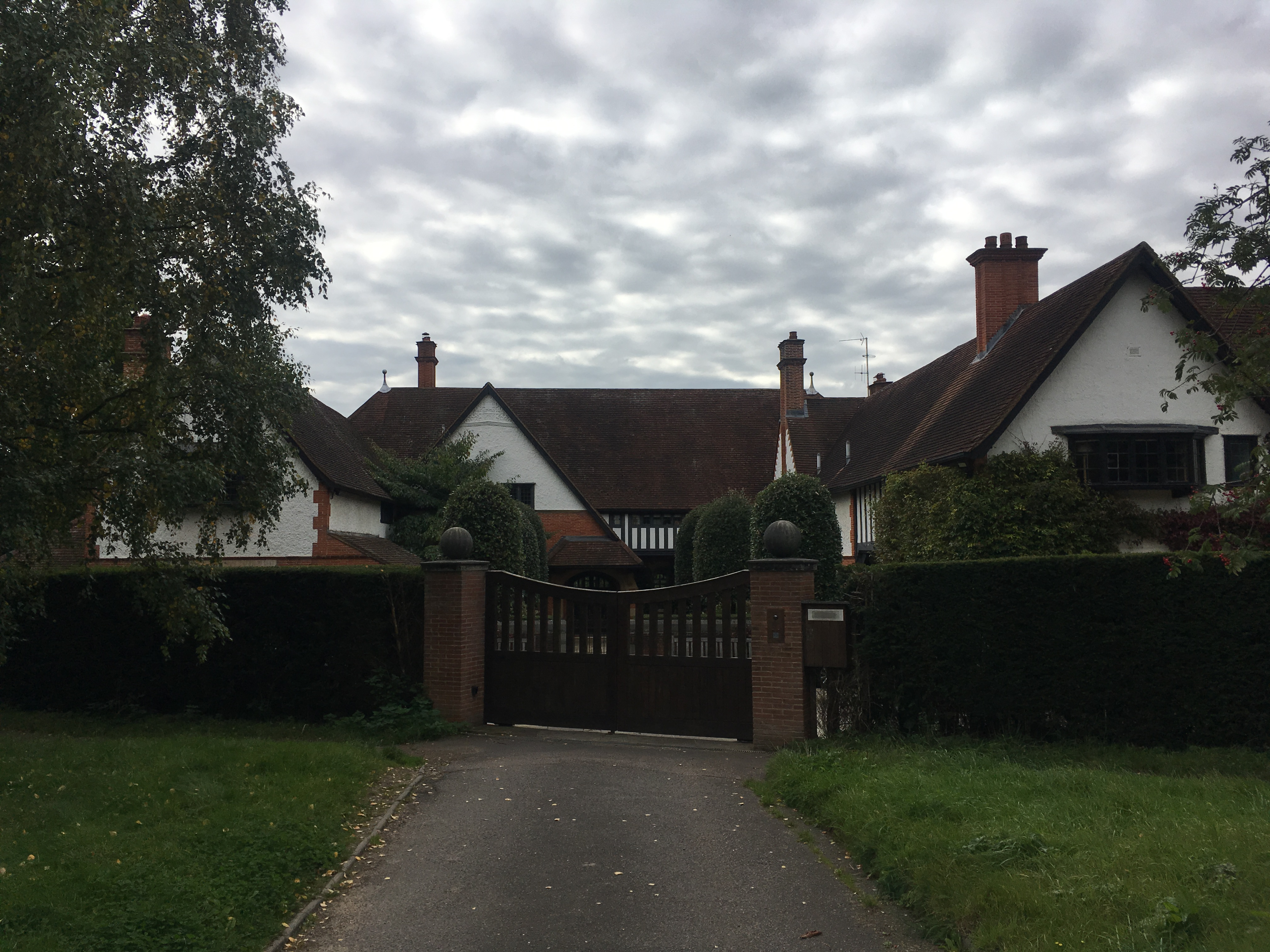
The Croft in September 2017

The Croft is a large detached house on Totteridge Green in Totteridge, Barnet. It has been Grade II listed on the National Heritage List for England since November 1974.

The house was designed by the English architect T.E. Collcutt as his personal residence. It was subsequently profiled in an 1899 issue of The Builder. The formal gardens of The Croft originally contained a sculpture of Triton by Henry Pegram.

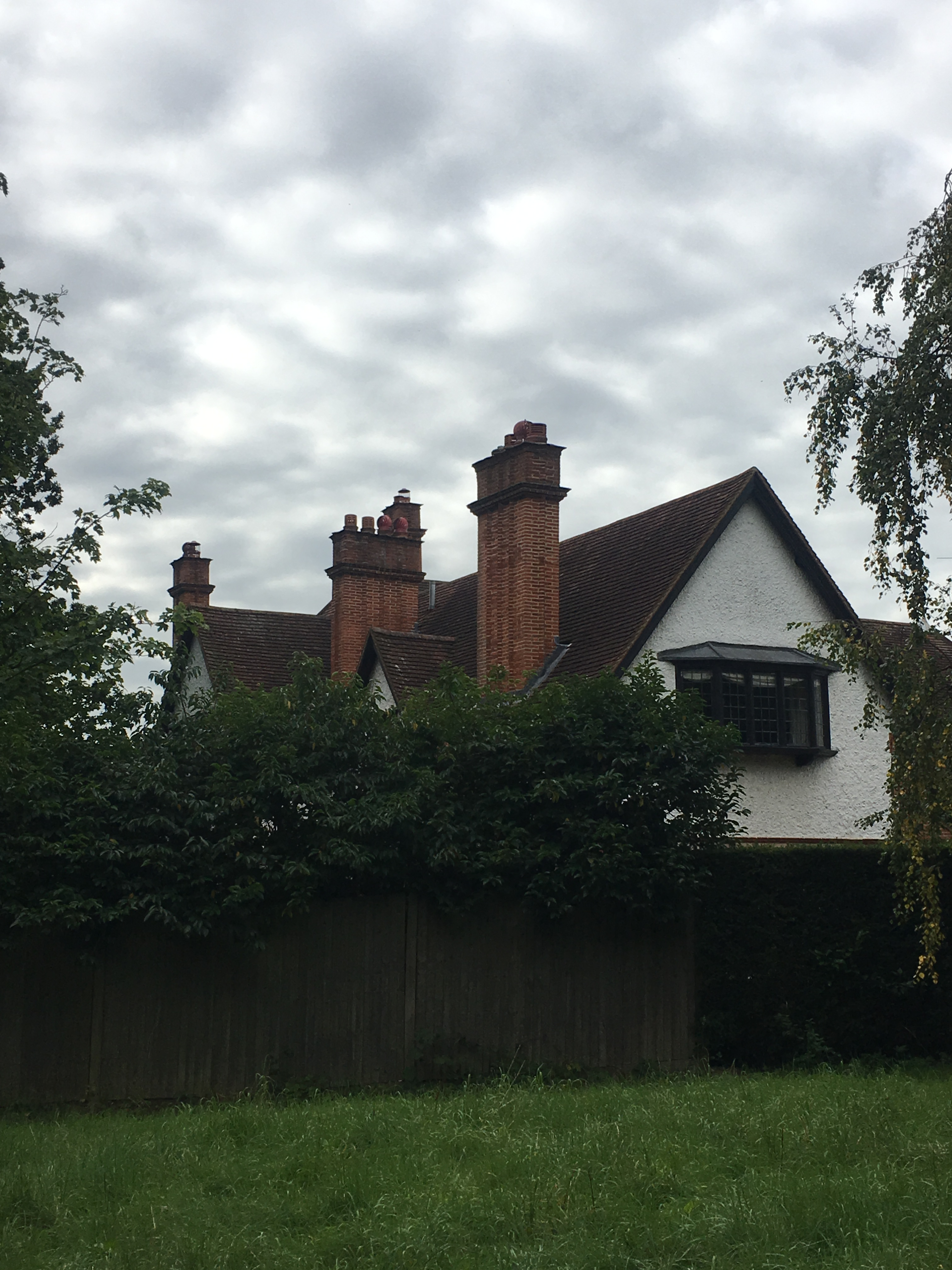
The distinctive chimneys of The Croft

Collcutt also built another Grade II listed house on Totteridge Green, Fairspeir, and The Lynch House on Totteridge Common. Bridget Cherry, writing in the 1998 London: North edition of the Pevsner Architectural Guides, described The Croft as 'very picturesque' and 'a more relaxed version' of Richard Norman Shaw's 'Old English style'. The interior was described as having 'pretty plasterwork' and tiles by William De Morgan. The 1977 edition of the Pevsner guides had described the Croft's design as "three ranges and a court, roughcast, with Tudor windows" likening it to the domestic architecture of C. F. A. Voysey.
