= Castle Croft =

Coordinates: 57.316°N 2.687°W

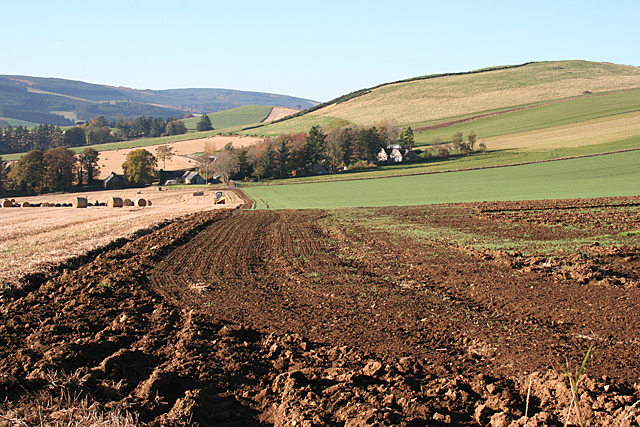
New Leslie, Aberdeenshire. The castle may have been to the upper left of the farm buildings.

Castle Croft was located near New Leslie farm, about 5 kilometres (3.1 mi) south-west of Insch, in Aberdeenshire, Scotland. It was the property of the Leslie family, from the later 15th century. By the early 17th century, it was the residence of the Leith family, before they built and occupied Leith Hall from 1650. The castle is recorded as being in ruins in 1724, and the final remains were removed in 1842. No trace of the castle can be seen today.
