= Lewis Crofts =

English author and journalist

Lewis Charles Crofts (born in Blackburn, United Kingdom on 5 November 1977) is an English author and journalist. Crofts is a correspondent for MLex, a news agency focusing on regulation. He is currently editor-at-large of MLex.

== Early life and education ==
He studied Modern and Medieval Languages at St Catherine's College, Oxford University. He has lived in Hanover (Germany), France, Prague (Czech Republic) and Brussels (Belgium), working as a journalist and translator.

== Career ==
His first book, The Pornographer of Vienna, is a novel based on the life of Austrian painter Egon Schiele who was famous for his sexually explicit depictions of the Viennese underworld. It was published in June 2007 by Old Street Publishing in the UK and in July 2008 in North America.

The novel was published in Italy in September 2008 by Marco Tropea under the title Il pornografo di Vienna. A Russian translation followed in 2023, published by Eksmo. Other fiction writing has appeared in the Prague Revue, Notes from the Underground and Ether Magazine. Non-fiction writing has appeared in publications including The Times, The Financial Times, The Bulletin and The Parliament Magazine.

== Bibliography ==
- The Pornographer of Vienna
- The Best Day of My Life (story in anthology, ed. Giles Vickers-Jones)
- Madwoman on a Pilgrimage by Johann Wolfgang von Goethe (foreword by L.Crofts, trans. A.Piper)
- And So They Came (story in anthology The Return of Kral Majales, ed. Louis Armand)

== Articles ==
- "Exploding the Marat myth" November 2007, The Bulletin
- Karl Marx, Das Kapital: erster Band

== Reviews ==
- Guardian review 9 June 2007
- Il Venerdì 22 July 2008, Vita, Morte e Segreti del "pornografo" Schiele
- Il Mattino 3 July 2008, Schiele pornografia ed erotismo
- Financial Times review 8 June 2007 "Art of Darkness
- La Repubblica 4 September 2008
- Here Is The City
