= Ashcroft =

Ashcroft may refer to:

== Places ==
- Ashcroft, British Columbia, a village in Canada
  - Ashcroft House in Bagpath, Gloucestershire, England—eponym of the Canadian village
- Ashcroft, New South Wales, a suburb of Sydney, Australia
- Ashcroft, Colorado, a former U.S. mining town, south of Aspen
- Ashcroft (Geneva, New York), a historic house
- Ashcroft Technology Academy, a secondary school in London, UK

== People ==
- Charlie Ashcroft (1926–2010), English footballer
- Chloe Ashcroft, British television presenter
- Christina Ashcroft (born 1964), Canadian sport shooter
- Dolores Ashcroft-Nowicki, British occultist
- Edgar Arthur Ashcroft (1864–1938), invented zinc extraction process in Australia
- Ernest Ashcroft (1925–1985), English professional rugby league footballer
- Lee Ashcroft, English footballer
- Lee Ashcroft (footballer, born 1993), Scottish footballer
- James Ashcroft, (b. 1978), New Zealand film director
- Jay Ashcroft, American politician
- Jimmy Ashcroft, English footballer
- John Ashcroft, the 79th Attorney General of the United States under George W. Bush (2001–2005)
- Ken Ashcroft, Australian rugby league footballer
- Marcus Ashcroft, Australian rules footballer
- Michael Arbuthnot Ashcroft, British codebreaker in Hut 8 during WW2
- Michael Ashcroft, Baron Ashcroft, British businessman and member of the House of Lords
- Neil Ashcroft (1938–2021), condensed matter physicist
- Peggy Ashcroft, English actress
- Ray Ashcroft, English actor
- Richard Ashcroft, English musician, frontman for The Verve
- Stella Ashcroft (born 2002), New Zealand gymnast
- William Ashcroft, English artist

== See also ==
- Ascroft, a surname
