= Daniel W. Crofts =

American historian

Daniel W. Crofts is an American historian and professor emeritus at The College of New Jersey (TCNJ). He has written five books on Civil War era politics and other subjects. His books are about Abraham Lincoln's proposal for a 13th amendment to the U.S. Constitution, Abraham Lincoln and the politics of slavery, William Henry Hurlbert and his diary, Southampton, Virginia, and southern unionists. He received a Ph.D. from Yale University in 1968. He formerly taught at George School and has contributed to The New York Times blog "Disunion".

== Personal life ==
He is married to wife Betsy and has 2 daughters. He is a Quaker.

== Books ==
- Reluctant Confederates: Upper South Unionists in the Secession Crisis (1989)
- Old Southampton: Politics and Society in a Virginia County, 1834-1869. University Press of Virginia (1992)
- A Secession Crisis Enigma; William Henry Hurlbert and "The Diary of a Public Man". Louisiana State University Press (2010)
- Lincoln and the Politics of Slavery; The Other Thirteenth Amendment and the Struggle to Save the Union. University of North Carolina Press (2016)
- Cobb's Ordeal: The Diaries of a Virginia Farmer, 1842-1872, editor
