= Theodore G. Croft =

American politician

Theodore Gaillard Croft
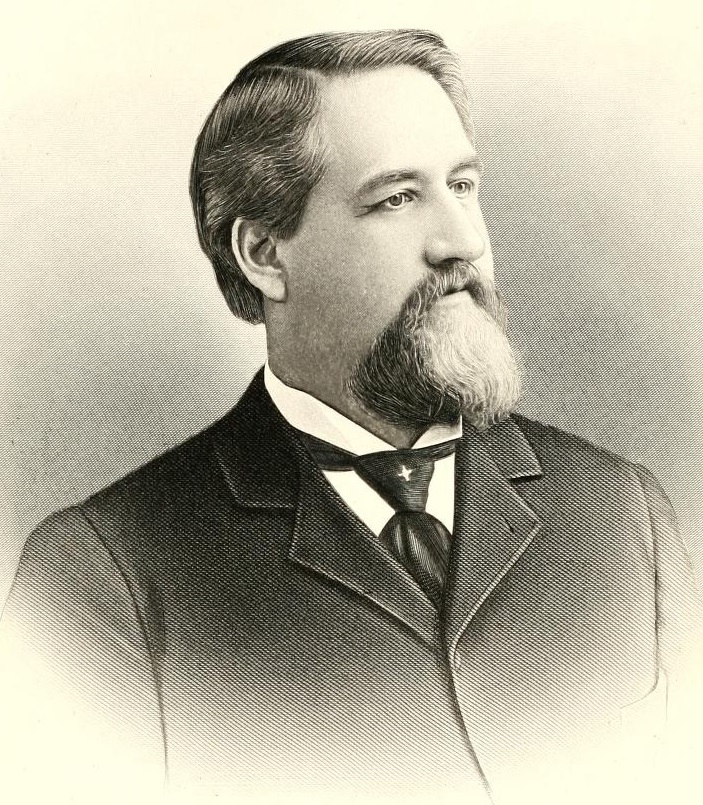
- From Volume II (1908) of Men of Mark In South Carolina

Member of the U.S. House of Representatives from South Carolina's 2nd district
- In office May 17, 1904 – March 3, 1905
- Preceded by: George W. Croft
- Succeeded by: James O'H. Patterson

Member of the South Carolina Senate from Aiken County
- In office January 12, 1909 – February 29, 1912
- Preceded by: Gasper Loren Toole
- Succeeded by: John Frederick Williams

Member of the South Carolina House of Representatives from Aiken County
- In office January 8, 1907 – March 7, 1908

Personal details
- Born: November 26, 1874 Aiken, South Carolina, U.S.
- Died: March 23, 1920 (aged 45) Aiken, South Carolina, U.S.
- Resting place: Aiken, South Carolina
- Party: Democratic
- Education: University of South Carolina (LL.B.)
- Profession: attorney

Military service
- Allegiance: United States
- Branch/service: United States Army
- Years of service: 1918
- Rank: Private

Theodore Gaillard Croft (November 26, 1874 – March 23, 1920) was a U.S. representative from South Carolina, son of George William Croft.

Born in Aiken, South Carolina, Croft attended the common schools. He graduated from Bethel Military Academy in Warrenton, Virginia in 1895 and from the law department of the University of South Carolina at Columbia in 1897. He was admitted to the bar the same year and commenced practice in Aiken, South Carolina.

Croft was elected as a Democrat to the Fifty-eighth Congress to fill the vacancy caused by the death of his father, George W. Croft, and served from May 17, 1904, to March 3, 1905. While in Congress, he carried on his father's idea of building a post office in downtown Aiken. He was not a candidate for renomination in 1904. He resumed the practice of law in Aiken, South Carolina. He later served as member of the State House of Representatives from 1907 to 1908. He served in the State Senate from 1909 to 1912.

After the outbreak of World War I, he enlisted in the U.S. Army October 29, 1918. He was assigned to duty as a private in the Field Artillery Central Officers' Training School, Camp Zachary Taylor, and served until December 5, 1918, when he was honorably discharged.

Afterward, he resumed the practice of law. He died in Aiken, South Carolina, March 23, 1920 and was interred in St. Thaddeus' Episcopal Churchyard.

== Sources ==
- United States Congress. "Theodore G. Croft (id: C000922)". Biographical Directory of the United States Congress.

U.S. House of Representatives
Preceded by George W. Croft	Member of the U.S. House of Representatives from South Carolina's 2nd congressional district 1904–1905	Succeeded by James O'H. Patterson
