= George W. Croft =

American politician

George William Croft
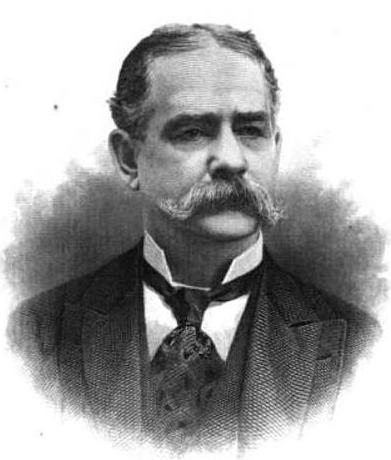

Member of the U.S. House of Representatives from South Carolina's 2nd district
- In office March 4, 1903 – March 10, 1904
- Preceded by: W. Jasper Talbert
- Succeeded by: Theodore G. Croft

Member of the South Carolina House of Representatives from Aiken County
- In office November 28, 1882 – December 24, 1883
- In office January 8, 1901 – February 22, 1902

Member of the South Carolina Senate
- In office 1880

Personal details
- Born: December 20, 1846 Newberry County, South Carolina
- Died: March 10, 1904 (aged 57) Washington, D.C.
- Resting place: Aiken, South Carolina
- Party: Democratic
- Education: South Carolina Military Academy; University of Virginia
- Profession: Attorney

Military service
- Allegiance: Confederate States of America
- Branch/service: Confederate States Army
- Years of service: 1864–1865
- Battles/wars: American Civil War

George William Croft (December 20, 1846 – March 10, 1904) was a U.S. representative from South Carolina, father of Theodore Gaillard Croft.

Born in Newberry County, South Carolina, Croft attended the common schools in Greenville, South Carolina. He entered the South Carolina Military Academy at Charleston in 1863. Along with all the other cadets at the Citadel, he was mustered into the Confederate States Army in 1864 and served until the close of the Civil War.

He attended the University of Virginia at Charlottesville in 1866 and 1867, where he studied law. He was admitted to the bar in 1869 and commenced practice in Aiken, South Carolina, in 1870. He served as president of the State bar association.

He served as member of the State House of Representatives from 1882 to 1883 and 1901–1902. He served in the State Senate in 1880.

Croft was elected as a Democrat to the Fifty-eighth Congress and served from March 4, 1903, until his death from a splinter in Washington, D.C., on March 10, 1904. While serving in Congress, he proposed the idea of building a post office in downtown Aiken. Upon his death, his son Theodore G. Croft was elected to finish his father's term in Congress. His son carried on the idea of building the post office. He was interred in St. Thaddeus' Episcopal Churchyard, Aiken, South Carolina.

== See also ==
- List of members of the United States Congress who died in office (1900–1949)

== Sources ==
- United States Congress. "George W. Croft (id: C000921)". Biographical Directory of the United States Congress.
- George W. Croft, late a representative from South Carolina, Memorial addresses delivered in the House of Representatives and Senate frontispiece 1905

U.S. House of Representatives
Preceded by W. Jasper Talbert	Member of the U.S. House of Representatives from South Carolina's 2nd congressional district 1903–1904	Succeeded by Theodore G. Croft
