= Chancy Croft =

American politician (1937–2022)

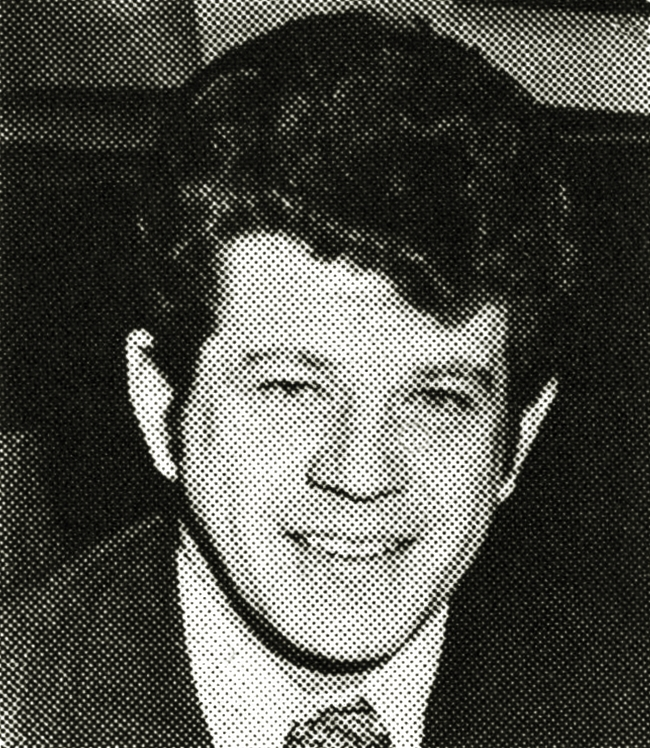

Chair of the University of Alaska Board of Regents
- In office 2001–2002
- Preceded by: Michael Burns
- Succeeded by: Brian D. Rogers

Member of the University of Alaska Board of Regents
- In office 1995–2003
- Preceded by: Mark Helmericks
- Succeeded by: Cynthia Henry

President of the Alaska Senate
- In office 1975–1977
- Preceded by: Terry Miller
- Succeeded by: John Rader

Member of the Alaska Senate from the E district
- In office January 11, 1971 – January 14, 1979
- Preceded by: Multi-member district
- Succeeded by: Terry Stimson

Member of the Alaska House of Representatives from the 8th district
- In office January 27, 1969 – January 10, 1971
- Preceded by: Multi-member district
- Succeeded by: Multi-member district

Personal details
- Born: Leland Chancy Croft; January 21, 1937 Jennings, Louisiana, U.S.
- Died: August 30, 2022 (aged 85) Salem, Oregon, U.S
- Party: Democratic
- Spouse: Toni Williamson
- Children: 3, including Eric Croft
- Education: University of Texas, Austin (BA, LLB)

Leland Chancy Croft (August 21, 1937 – August 30, 2022) was an American politician and workers' compensation attorney. Elected to the Alaska House of Representatives in 1968, he served a single term from 1969 to 1971. He was then elected to the Alaska Senate, serving in that body from 1971 to 1979, including serving as the president of the Senate from 1975 to 1977 during the 9th Alaska State Legislature.

In 1978, he ran for Governor of Alaska, winning the Democratic nomination in the primary election over two challengers. He would then become the first of 3 major party nominees in Alaska gubernatorial elections to place third in the general election. The 1978 gubernatorial election was dominated by Republican challenger Walter Hickel. Hickel lost the primary to incumbent Jay Hammond by 98 votes, then launched a write-in campaign, which outpolled Croft in the general election.

Croft largely retired from electoral politics after this campaign, but remained prominent in legal and political circles in Alaska. He founded the Croft Law Office, a workers' compensation firm, in downtown Anchorage, and appeared before the Alaska Supreme Court in over sixty cases. He served a term on the University of Alaska Board of Regents from 1995 to 2003, including as chair of the body from 2001 to 2002. His older son, Eric, has gone on to have his own political career.

== Early life ==
Leland Chancy Croft was born in Jennings, Louisiana on August 21, 1937, the son of Leland Croft, an oil and gas landman and geologist, and Dorthy (née Chancy) Croft, a violin teacher. He grew up in Odessa, Texas, where he graduated high school. He graduated from the University of Texas at Austin with baccalaureate degrees in government and sociology, as well as a law degree.

Not long after arriving in Anchorage from Texas in 1962, Croft became a charter member of the Alaska Legal Services Corporation, serving as chairman of the Board of Governors from 1971 to 1978.

== Political career ==
Chancy Croft was elected to the Alaska House of Representatives in 1968, serving a single term. He was then elected to the Alaska Senate in 1970, serving from 1971 until 1979. He served as Senate President from 1975 to 1977.

He was the Democratic Party's nominee for Governor of Alaska in 1978. Croft won the nomination over Jalmar M. Kerttula and Ed Merdes; both had served in the Senate themselves. Croft was paired with lieutenant gubernatorial nominee Katie Hurley. Hurley, as Katherine T. Alexander, was a government official in the latter days of the Territory of Alaska, who married Alaska constitution signer James J. "Jim" Hurley in 1960 and settled in his home area, the Matanuska-Susitna Valley. While still involved in Democratic Party politics, Hurley was largely out of the public eye at that point, busy raising her daughters in Wasilla.

Croft's campaign would be the first of three times in Alaska gubernatorial elections that the major party nominee came in third in the general election. The campaign was overshadowed by the aftermath of the Republican primary between incumbent Jay Hammond and former governor Walter Hickel. Hickel lost the primary by 98 votes, and after an extensive court challenge, launched a write-in campaign. Both Hammond (who won reelection) and Hickel outpolled Croft in the general election.

Croft was a member of the University of Alaska Board of Regents from 1995 until 2003; he was chairman from 2001 to 2002. He worked to provide educational service to rural Alaska communities while guiding the university toward increased distance delivery education. He is responsible for establishing the Regents Scholarship benefiting UA junior, senior and graduate students. Croft was awarded an Honorary Doctor of Law from the University of Alaska Anchorage.

== Legal career ==
Chancy Croft appeared before the Alaska Supreme Court in over sixty cases, winning two-thirds of those cases. In at least twelve cases, he lost to the Alaska Workers Compensation Board and in the Alaska Superior Court, only to succeed in the Supreme Court. He founded The Croft Law Office, located in an older downtown Anchorage office building near the Conoco-Phillips Building.

In 1986, his article, Something More Important Than Money: Vocational Rehabilitation in Workers Compensation Cases, was published in the Alaska Law Review. The article lauded the Alaska statute providing injured workers with training for new careers. The legislature promptly repealed the statute. He unsuccessfully worked with the legislature on potential changes to the Alaska Workers Compensation Act. In 2005, he sued the governor of Alaska, challenging the constitutionality of legislation which created a new executive court to hear appeals from decisions of the Alaska Workers Compensation Board.

== Personal life ==
Leland Chancy Croft was commonly known by his middle name, which is also his mother's maiden name. His oldest child, Eric (see below), bears the same middle name.

He was married to Antoinette Ruth "Toni" (née Williamson) Croft, a graduate of Stanford University. He had three children- Eric, Kymberly and Lee. Eric's own career in politics would also include serving in the legislature and running for governor. He additionally ran for mayor of Anchorage. Eric worked with his father at The Croft Law Office. His sister, Dona Lee Croft, is a professor of violin at the Royal College of Music in London.

Croft died on August 30, 2022, at the age of 85.

Political offices
Preceded by Terry Miller	President of the Alaska Senate; 1975–1977	Succeeded by John Rader
Party political offices
Preceded by Bill Egan	Democratic nominee for Governor of Alaska; 1978	Succeeded by Bill Sheffield
