= Catherine Salkeld =

Scottish actress

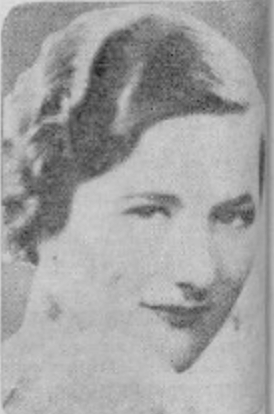
- Catherine Salkeld, from a 1934 newspaper
- Born: 24 July 1909; Edinburgh, Scotland, U.K.
- Died: 15 April 1980; London, England, U.K.
- Occupation: Actress
- Relatives: Arthur Johnstone-Douglas (grandfather); Sholto Johnstone Douglas (uncle)

Catherine Elizabeth Salkeld (24 July 1909 – 15 April 1980) was a Scottish actress, known for her work with the Perth Repertory Company in the 1930s and 1940s.

== Early life and education ==
Salkeld was born in Edinburgh, the daughter of Carleton Salkeld and Octavia Johnstone-Douglas Salkeld. Her father had a career in the British Army; her mother was an early supporter of the Girl Guides movement. She had a younger sister, Isobel. Her grandfather was soldier and politician Arthur Johnstone-Douglas. Her uncle was artist Sholto Johnstone Douglas, and her first cousins included John Carnegie, 12th Earl of Northesk and Patrick Balfour, 3rd Baron Kinross. She trained as an actress at a school run by her uncle Walter, the Webber-Douglas Academy of Dramatic Art in South Kensington.

== Career ==
Salkeld acted on stage, on radio, and on television. Her stage work, much of it with the Perth Repertory Company included roles in Grounds for Divorce (1934), Beyond (1934), The Rose Without a Thorn (1935), Lovers' Leap (1935), Quality Street (1935), Michael and Mary (1935), The Green Goddess (1936), A Cuckoo in the Nest (1936), And So to Bed (1936), Mrs. Moonlight (1936), Berkeley Square (1936), Polly with a Past (1936), Advertising April (1936), Yew Tree Farm (1937), Tudor Wench (1937), Nina (1938), The Prisoner of Zenda (1938), Private Lives (1938), Beware the Dog (1939), The Morning After (1939), Strange Reality (1939), Man with a Load of Mischief (1944), House of Regrets (1944), The Master Builder (1944), The Madwoman of Chaillot (1951), The Thistle and the Rose (1951), The King's Son (1953), and The Magic Pipe (1953). "Success is won by Miss Salkeld in every performance," commented one reviewer in 1937, calling her "an artist out of the ordinary."

Salkeld joined the BBC Drama Repertory Company in 1953. On screen, she was seen in television programmes including Pride and Prejudice (1938), Nocturne in Scotland (1951), Mother Michel and Her Cat (1955), The Infinite Shoeblack (1956), The Twopenny Diamond (1956), and Emergency Ward 10 (1957). In 1960, she directed a production of Dangerous Corner at the Webber-Douglas Academy of Dramatic Art.

== Personal life ==
Salkeld died in 1980, at the age of 70, in London.
