= John Lamont (sugar planter) =

Sugar planter (1782–1850)

- Born: February 3, 1782; Inverchaolain, Scotland
- Died: November 20, 1850 (aged 68); Diego Martin, Trinidad
- Occupation: Sugar planter
- Known for: plantations, Benmore Estate

John Lamont (3 February 1782 - 20 November 1850) from Inverchaolain, by Toward in Cowal, emigrated from Scotland in 1801 to Trinidad where he served his apprenticeship as an overseer and manager on a sugar plantation. He purchased his own estates, and became a wealthy sugar planter. From 1828 he made annual visits back to Scotland, and bought Benmore Estate in 1849 for his nephew James Lamont, but died in 1850 before planned construction of the new Benmore House was completed. The house is now an outdoor education centre in Benmore Botanic Garden.

== Early life ==
The McGorrie Lamonts "of both Inverchaolain and Knockdow" were a cadet family of Clan Lamont. Their home was in Inverchaolain parish, on the east shore of Loch Striven in the Cowal peninsula in Argyll, Scotland. The hamlet of Inverchaolain is about 7 miles (11 km) to the north of Toward where Loch Striven joins the Firth of Clyde.

John Lamont was born on 3 February 1782 and christened on 3 February at Inverchaolain church. The parish record states "John Lamont Natural Son to Mr. James Lamont Esq. of Knockdow & Isobel Clerk daughter to Duncan Clerk in Gortainamiaig". His mother has been described as "a person of lower station", and the term natural son indicates that his parents were not married. The legal situation was that, although he was his father's first son, John could not inherit land from the family. His father subsequently married Elizabeth Robertson and had more children, the first being Alexander Lamont. Eventually, the family included 14 sons and one daughter.

== Trinidad sugar planter ==
At the age of 20, John Lamont emigrated to the Caribbean, probably taking ship at Greenock or Port Glasgow, and arrived in Trinidad around 1801 or 1802. He served his apprenticeship as overseer and manager on the Eccles sugar plantation. before becoming a planter and slaveowner himself. In 1809, he and a friend bought the Cedar Grove sugar estate of 360 acres (150 ha) in South Naparima, which had more than a hundred slaves on it.

His family made contact again in 1816, when his half-brother Alexander Lamont wrote him a "truly fraternal letter" with news of their brothers. John Lamont replied that he was "charmed with your description of the happy party assembled at Kirkmichael. How delighted I should be to make one of the number." In 1817 Boyden Lamont, one of his half-brothers, came out to Trinidad to join the sugar business. John bought Boyden the adjacent Canaan estate with 70 slaves, and in 1819 John purchased the lave (or remaining share) of the Cedar Grove estate. In 1823–1824 he gave evidence to the enquiry by Royal Commissioners, including Fortunatus Dwarris, into proposed changes to English law affecting the West Indies: Lamont described himself as "a sugar planter" who had two estates of his own, and "3 more under my superintendence as attorney". He said he had served "first as overseer, then as manager, and now a proprietor".

in 1829, after a visit to Scotland, Lamont returned to Trinidad with his cousin George Cole, who became his Glasgow agent for sugar sales. Also in 1829, Lamont added 120 acres (49 ha) called "La Grenade" to his Cedar Grove estate, and he later became part-proprietor of the "St Helena" estate. After the Slavery Abolition Act 1833, he got £9,000 government compensation for 170 slaves, while Boyden got £3,700 for 78 slaves on his Caanan estate. In 1836 John Lamont was a member of the Port of Spain Presbyterian Church Committee of Management. Boyden Lamont died in 1837, his estate was inherited by John who passed an interest in it on to their brothers James and Norman.

== Visits to Scotland, and Benmore Estate ==
When Lamont's father fell ill, he greatly wished to see his oldest son again. John returned to Toward from October 1828 to June 1829 to see his father, who died on 6 December 1829, after John went back to Trinidad. From then on, John Lamont revisited Toward every year. Four of his brothers had already died, and Alexander was the only one who had a son; James Lamont. John became fond of his nephew and saw in him the potential to renew the position of the Lamont family. After visiting his uncle in Trinidad in 1847, James returned to Scotland and John engaged lawyers to find his nephew a suitable Scottish household. He bought Benmore Estate in 1849, and arranged for architects to construct a new Benmore House to replace the old manor house.

John Lamont visited Scotland that year to see what progress was being made. He returned to Trinidad, but on 20 November 1850 died at his house, the Cascade, in Diego Martin. He was buried next to his brother Boyden in a cemetery in the Caanan estate, which now forms part of the La Romaine district of San Fernando. There was an extended tax dispute as to whether Lamont had been domiciled in Scotland or the West Indies when he died.

James Lamont inherited the estates, but his interests were in exploring and he sold the Benmore Estate, while continuing to profit from his Trinidad estates which he only visited five more times. In 1907 he handed them on to his son Sir Norman Lamont, 2nd Baronet, who diversified away from sugar planting and made considerable agricultural improvements. He lived at Palmiste, San Fernando, Trinidad, and on his death in 1949, Norman was buried in the Caanan cemetery beside Boyden and John Lamont.

== See also ==
- List of slave owners
