= Lamont baronets =

Extinct baronetcy in the Baronetage of the United Kingdom

Escutcheon of the Lamont baronets of Knockdaw

The Lamont baronetcy, of Knockdaw in the Parish of Inverchaolain in the County of Argyll, was a title in the Baronetage of the United Kingdom. It was created on 16 July 1910 for the Scottish explorer and Member of Parliament, James Lamont. He was succeeded by his son, the 2nd Baronet, also a politician, Member of Parliament for Buteshire. He never married and the title became extinct on his death in 1949.

== Lamont baronets, of Knockdaw (1910) ==
- Sir James Lamont, 1st Baronet (1828–1913)
- Sir Norman Lamont, 2nd Baronet (1869–1949), left no heir.

Baronetage of the United Kingdom
Preceded by Prichard-Jones baronets	Lamont baronets of Knockdaw; 16 July 1910	Succeeded by Meyer baronets
