= Patrick Balfour, 2nd Baron Kinross =

The Right Honourable The Lord Kinross KC

Sheriff of Dumfries and Galloway
- In office 1927–1939
- Preceded by: Charles Herbert Brown
- Succeeded by: Charles Milne

Personal details
- Born: Patrick Balfour; 23 April 1870
- Died: 28 July 1939 (aged 69)
- Spouse: Caroline Johnstone-Douglas (m. 1903)
- Children: 5
- Parent(s): John Balfour, 1st Baron Kinross; Lilias Oswald Mackenzie
- Education: Harrow School
- Alma mater: Balliol College, Oxford

Patrick Balfour, 2nd Baron Kinross KC (23 April 1870 – 28 July 1939) was a Scottish peer and advocate.

== Early life ==
Balfour was born on 23 April 1870. He was the eldest son and only child of John Balfour, 1st Baron Kinross and the former Lilias Oswald Mackenzie. After the death of his mother, his father married the Hon. Marianne Eliza Moncrieff, a daughter of James Moncreiff, 1st Baron Moncreiff. Among younger his half-siblings were James Moncreiffe Balfour, Lt.-Cdr. John Ramsay Blair Balfour, Harry Robert Chichester Balfour, Norman Frederick William Balfour, and Isobel Nora Gwendoline Balfour.

His maternal grandparents were Donald Mackenzie, styled Lord Mackenzie, a Lord of Session, and the former Janet Alice Mitchell. His paternal grandparents were the Rev. Peter Balfour, minister of Clackmannan, the former Jane Ramsay Blair.

He was educated at Harrow School before attending Balliol College, Oxford, where he graduated in 1894.

== Career ==
He became a practising Advocate in 1897 and was later appointed King's counsel and held the office of Advocate-Depute between 1927 and 1937. He was director of the Scottish Widows' Fund and Life Assurance Society and the Bank of Scotland.

Upon his father's death on 22 January 1905, he succeeded to the barony of Kinross. Lord Kinross was admitted to Brigadier of the Royal Company of Archers and served as Sheriff of Dumfries and Galloway from 1927 until his death in 1939.

== Personal life ==
On 18 August 1903 Caroline Elsie Johnstone-Douglas (d. 1969), the sixth daughter of Arthur Johnstone-Douglas of Lockerbie (the eldest son of Robert Johnstone-Douglas and Lady Jane Mary Margaret Douglas, a younger daughter of Charles Douglas, 6th Marquess of Queensberry). Together, they were the parents of two sons and three daughters:

- John Patrick Douglas Balfour, 3rd Baron Kinross (1904–1976), who married Angela Mary Culme-Seymour, a daughter of George Culme-Seymour and former wife of the artist John Spencer-Churchill, in 1938.
- David Andrew Balfour, 4th Baron Kinross (1906–1985), who married Araminta Peel, daughter of Lt.-Col. Willoughby Ewart Peel in 1936. They divorced in 1941 and he married Helen Anne Hog, daughter of Alan Welwood Hog, in 1948. After her death, he married Ruth Beverly Mill, daughter of William Henry Mill, in 1972
- Hon. Pamela Lillias Balfour (1907–1998), who married Charles Humphrey Scott-Plummer, a son of Lt.-Col. Joseph Walter Scott-Plummer, in 1933.
- Hon. Rosemary Jean Balfour (1910–1964), who married Alec Maskell Mitchell, son of Col. Alexander Mitchell, in 1934. They divorced in 1958 and she married Robert Monteath McLaren, son of James Monteath McLaren, in 1958.
- Hon. Ursula Nina Balfour (1914–2001), who married Lt.-Col. Christopher James York Dallmeyer, son of Richard Owen John Dallmeyer, in 1939.

Lord Kinross died on 28 July 1939 and was succeeded in the barony by his eldest son, Patrick. His widow, Lady Kinross, died on 18 February 1969.

=== Descendants ===
Through his son David, he was the grandfather of Christopher Patrick Balfour, 5th Baron Kinross (b. 1949).

Peerage of the United Kingdom
Preceded by John Blair Balfour	Baron Kinross; 1905–1939	Succeeded by John Patrick Douglas Balfour
