= Sir James Lamont, 1st Baronet =

Scottish explorer and author (1828–1913)

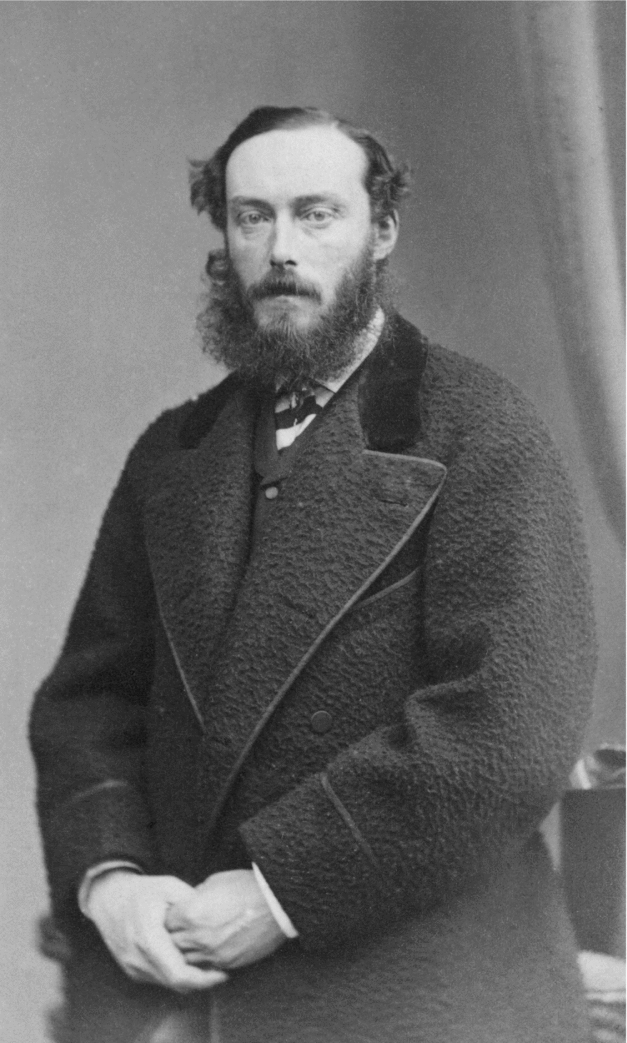
Lamont in c. 1861

James Lamont (28 April 1828 – 29 July 1913) was a Scottish explorer and author, particularly known for his voyages in the Arctic in 1858–1859 and 1869–1871, which were the topic of his two books, Seasons with the Sea-Horse (1861) and Yachting in the Arctic Seas (1876). He was a fellow of the Geological Society of London and the Royal Geographical Society. He served as the Liberal Member of Parliament for Buteshire (1865–1868), and was created a baronet in 1910.

== Early life ==
Map of the Arctic Ocean, which Lamont explored in 1858–59 and 1869–71

James Lamont was born on 28 April 1828 in Knockdow, Toward, on the Cowal peninsula in Argyll, to Jane (née Chrystie) and Alexander Lamont (1784–1861), a lawyer, Lieutenant-Colonel in the Bute militia and laird of Knockdow. His grandfather, also James Lamont, was a noted agriculturalist. James attended Rugby School, followed by the Edinburgh Military Academy. He served in the 91st Argyllshire Highlanders regiment in 1846–48, initially based in South Africa.

A large inheritance then enabled him to resign from the army and devote himself to travel; this came from his father's illegitimate half-brother John Lamont (1782–1850), and derived from slave-worked sugar plantations in Trinidad, West Indies. James Lamont inherited several plantations in Trinidad, which he retained, as well as the Benmore Estate near Dunoon in Scotland, which he sold for £17,000. On his father's death in 1861 he also inherited the Knockdow lairdship.

== Travel and writings ==
According to the academic C. Leah Devlin, Lamont's inspiration to travel to the Arctic was the 1820 book by William Scoresby, An Account of the Arctic Regions. Lamont made his first Arctic voyage in 1858, and visited various locations in the Svalbard (Spitzbergen) archipelago on the sailing vessel Ginevra, including overwintering on Edge Island. He was a "formidable" sailor, but later wrote that Ginevra proved "weak and unsuitable" for cutting through ice. In 1859, he returned to the Edge Island region on the Anna Louisa, a vessel designed for hunting walrus, and in 1862 visited Nova Scotia and Labrador. According to his obituaries in The Times and for the Royal Geographical Society, the primary purpose of these expeditions was hunting, and in addition to walrus, he pursued seals, reindeer, polar bears and grouse.

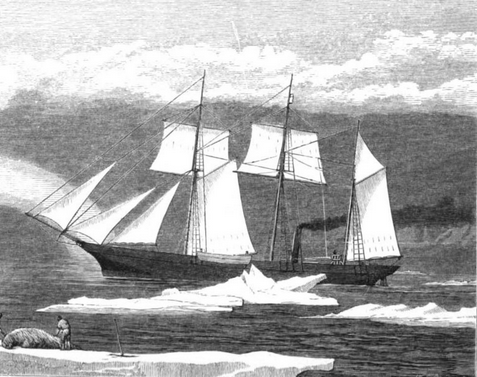
The Diana at Svalbard (William Livesay)

After his brief parliamentary career, Lamont had the schooner Diana constructed for him; the three-masted vessel with steam power, adapted for sailing in the Arctic seas, was launched in March 1869. For strength, the hull was finished with ironbark wood from the Australian gum tree. He undertook three or four Arctic voyages in 1869–71 with the Diana; as well as returning to the Svalbard archipelago, he explored Jan Mayen in the Greenland Sea, the Novaya Zemlya group and the Kara Sea, and islands in the Barents Sea such as Kolguyev Island. He tried unsuccessfully to locate "Wiche's Land", which the British sealer Thomas Edge claimed to have observed in 1617, but whose location and identity were a subject of debate in the late 19th century. Lamont claimed that this was the first expedition to use a steam-powered vessel in this area of the Arctic. He was accompanied on these later voyages by the surgeon Charles Edward Smith and the artist and amateur botanist, William Livesay.

Lamont described his Arctic travels in two books for a popular audience, Seasons with the Sea-Horse (1861) and Yachting in the Arctic Seas (1876), the latter illustrated and edited by Livesay. His Times obituarist describes the volumes as still providing "interesting reading", and A. G. E. Jones, in Lamont's Oxford Dictionary of National Biography entry, describes them as "attractively written books" that popularised the topic of the Arctic.

He also travelled in other regions, including extensive hunting trips in the Mediterranean (1863–64) and in South Africa, as well as several trips to the West Indies between 1850 and 1889, to oversee his business interests.

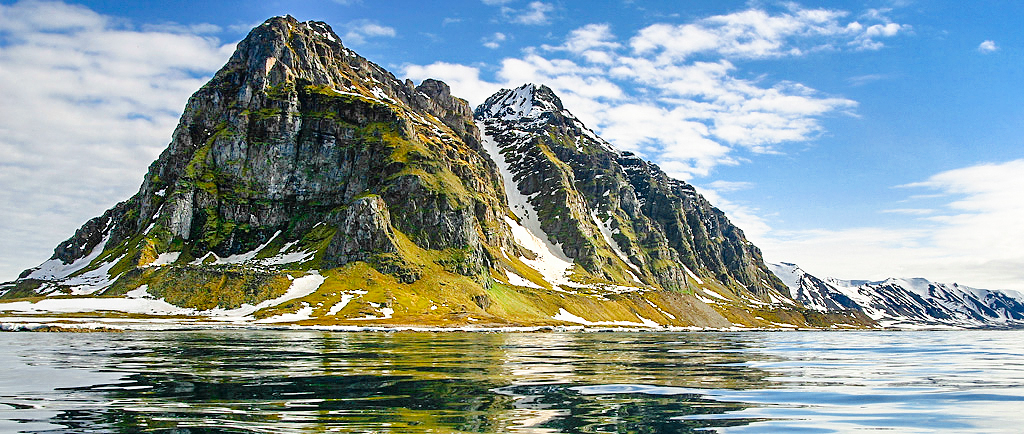
Prins Karls Forland in the Svalbard archipelago, which Lamont visited in 1871

He was a fellow of the Geological Society of London and the Royal Geographical Society (1861), resigning from the latter either in 1887 or around 1898. His correspondents included Charles Darwin.

== Parliamentary career ==
Lamont served as the Liberal Member of Parliament for Buteshire in 1865–68. He later wrote that gaining the seat had taken "much money and three arduous contests". He won the seat in the general election of July 1865, having previously stood unsuccessfully twice: in the general election of 1859 and in a by-election in February 1865. He stood down at the next general election. In office, he supported the Church Rates Abolition Bill, attempts to disestablish the Church of Ireland, rights for dissenters, and broadening the franchise.

== Personal life ==
In 1868, he married Adelaide Eliza Denys, daughter of Sir George William Denys; they had two sons and a daughter. His eldest son, Norman, entered politics, and was an amateur entomologist. His younger son, Alexander, was in the Gordon Highlanders, and died in action in Dargai; the date is variously given as 1897 and 1907. His daughter, Augusta, worked in the Department of Zoology at the University of Edinburgh.

In 1870, he consolidated his Trinidad estates, selling one and acquiring two more, and later built a factory at Palmiste to serve all of them. In 1907, he transferred the management of his Trinidad estates to Norman. His Scottish estate at the time of his death was described as more than 6,000 acres, and he also kept a house in London, his main residence when he was not travelling. He was president of the Clan Lamont Society, and senior member of the Highland Society of London. He was created a baronet on 16 July 1910.

He died at Knockdow on 29 July 1913, at the age of 85, after a prolonged illness. His son Norman succeeded him, but never married, and the baronetcy became extinct on his death. Augusta published a biographical account of her father in the Scottish Geographical Magazine in 1946, and compiled a volume of Records and Recollections in 1950.

== Further reading and external links ==
- P. J. Capelotti. Shipwreck at Cape Flora: The Expeditions of Benjamin Leigh Smith, England's Forgotten Arctic Explorer, pp. 34–45 (University of Calgary Press; 2013) ISBN 9781552387122
- C. Leah Devlin (2014). The letters between James Lamont and Charles Darwin on Arctic fauna. Polar Record 51 (5): 492–500 doi:10.1017/S0032247414000485
- Augusta Lamont (1946). Anent a Scots explorer. Biographical sketch of Sir James Lamont of Knockdow. Scottish Geographical Magazine 62 (2): 76–77 doi:10.1080/00369224608735320
- Matthew McDowell (26 October 2016). MP of the Month: James Lamont (1828–1913), Arctic explorer and scientist, The Victorian Commons
- Papers of the Lamont of Knockdow family, National Library of Scotland
- Hansard 1803–2005: contributions in Parliament by James Lamont

Parliament of the United Kingdom
Preceded by Hon. George Boyle	Member of Parliament for Buteshire; 1865–1868	Succeeded by Sir Charles Dalrymple, Bt
Baronetage of the United Kingdom
New creation	Baronet (of Knockdaw); 1910–1913	Succeeded by Norman Lamont
