= Patrick Balfour, 3rd Baron Kinross =

British historian (1904-1976)

The Right Honourable The Lord Kinross
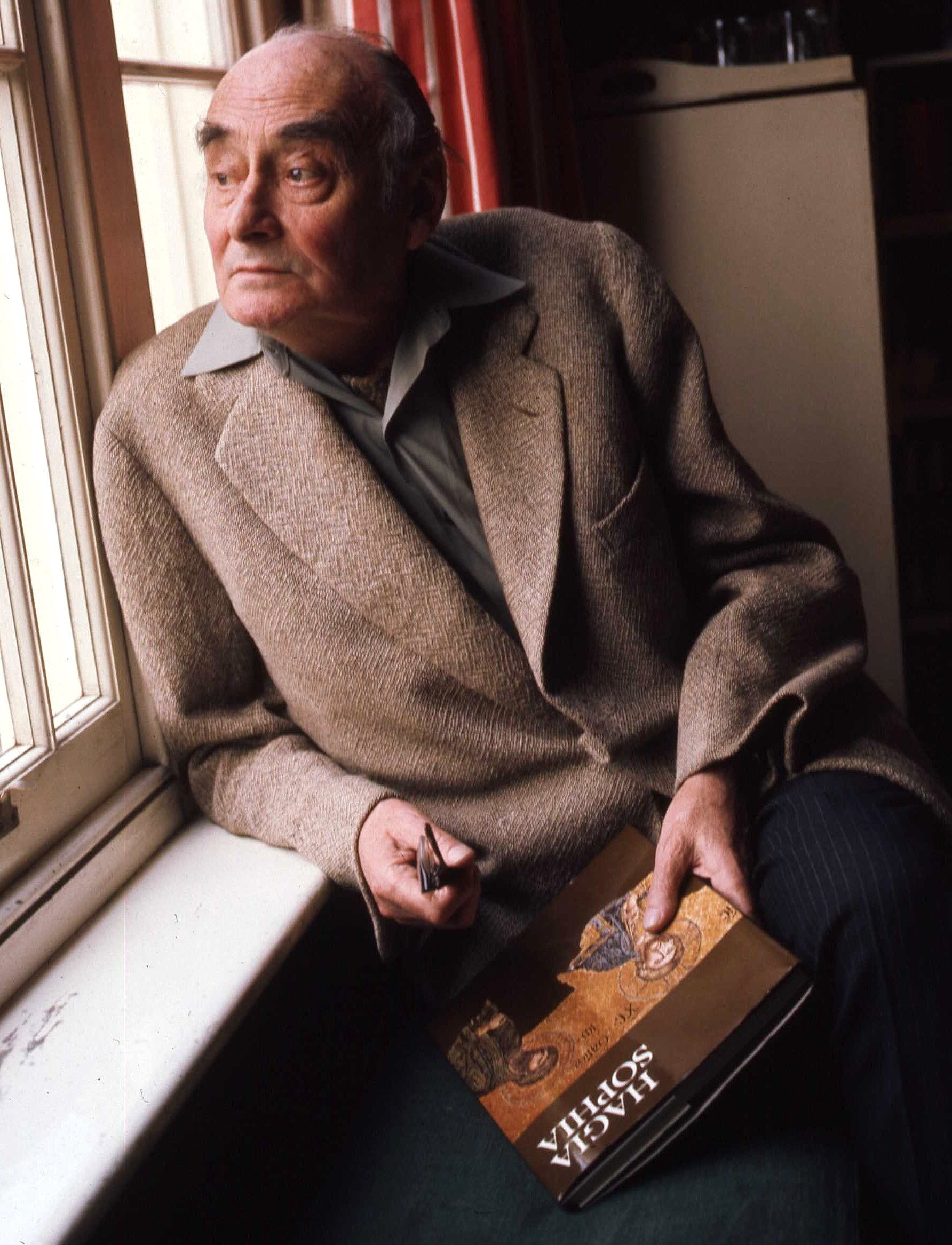
- 1975 portrait
- Born: John Patrick Douglas Balfour; 24 June 1904; Edinburgh, Scotland
- Died: 4 June 1976 (aged 71); Edinburgh, Scotland
- Spouse: Angela Mary Culme-Seymour (m. 1938; div. 1942)
- Parent(s): Patrick Balfour, 2nd Baron Kinross; Caroline Johnstone-Douglas
- Relatives: Arthur Johnstone-Douglas (grandfather)

John Patrick Douglas Balfour, 3rd Baron Kinross (25 June 1904 – 4 June 1976) was a Scottish historian and writer noted for his biography of Mustafa Kemal Atatürk and other works on Islamic history.

== Early life and education ==
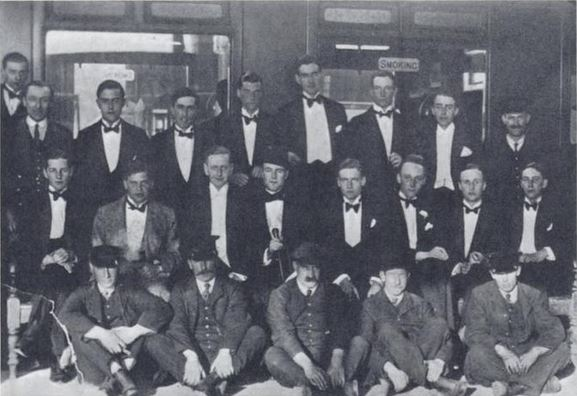
Railway Club at Oxford, conceived by John Sutro, dominated by Harold Acton. Left to right, back: Henry Yorke, Roy Harrod, Henry Weymouth, David Plunket Greene, Harry Stavordale, Brian Howard; middle row: Michael Rosse, John Sutro, Hugh Lygon, Harold Acton, Bryan Guinness, Patrick Balfour, Mark Ogilvie-Grant, Johnny Drury-Lowe; front: porters.

John Patrick Douglas Balfour was born in 1904 in Edinburgh, Scotland, the eldest son of Patrick Balfour, 2nd Baron Kinross and Caroline Elsie Johnstone-Douglas (1879–1969).

His paternal grandparents were the Lord Justice General John Balfour, 1st Baron Kinross and, his first wife, Lilias Oswald Mackenzie (a daughter of Donald Mackenzie, Lord Mackenzie). His maternal grandparents were Jane Maitland Hathorn-Stewart and Arthur Johnstone-Douglas, a member of the extended Marquess of Queensberry family.

He was educated at Winchester College and Balliol College, Oxford, where he was a member of the Railway Club. He then became a journalist and writer.

== Career ==
A prominent historian, Lord Kinross was noted for his biography of Mustafa Kemal Atatürk and works on Islamic history.

During the Second World War he served with the Royal Air Force, and from 1944 to 1947 was First Secretary at the British Embassy at Cairo, Egypt.

== Personal life ==
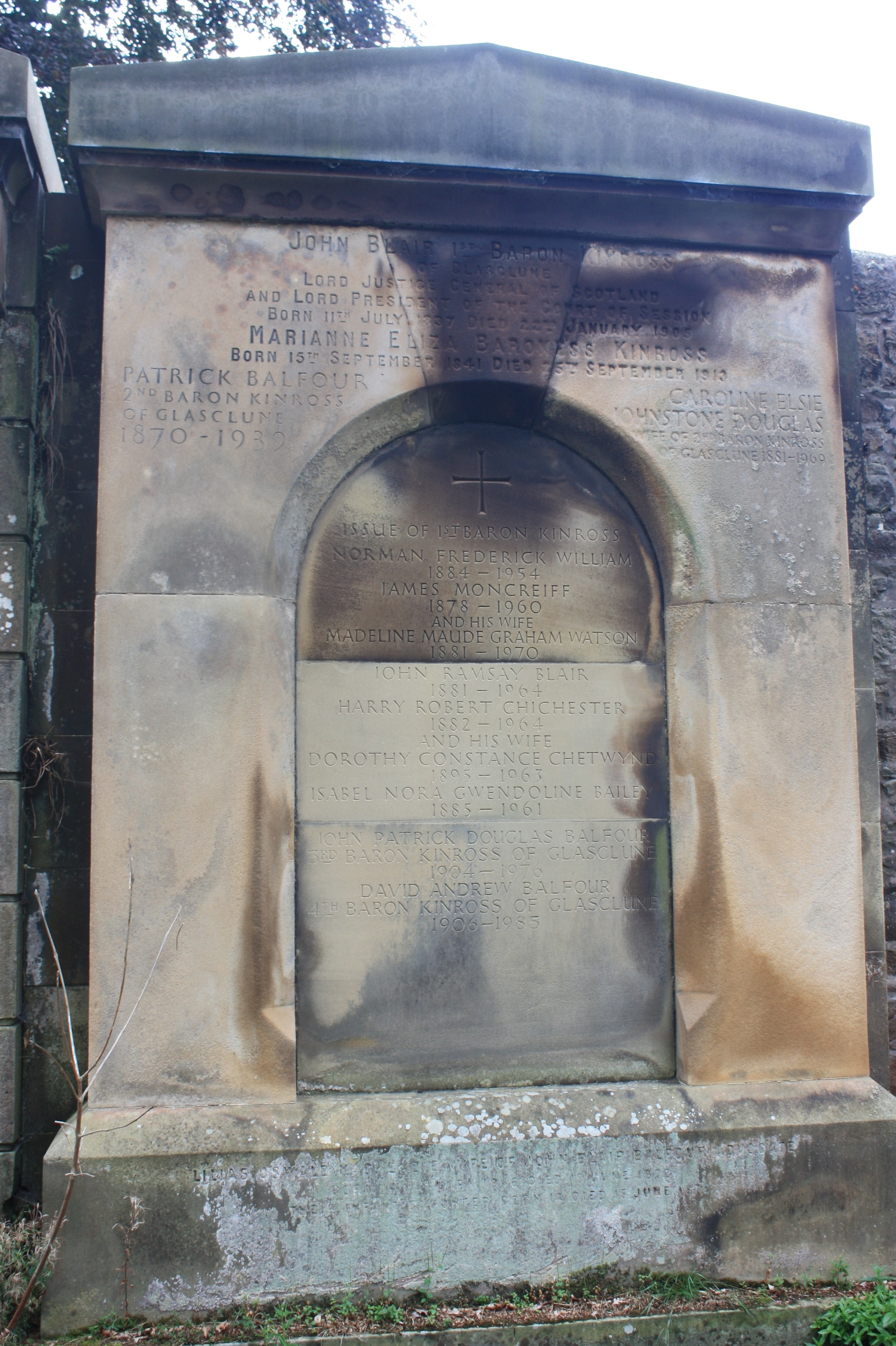
Baron Kinross monument, Dean Cemetery

In 1938, he married Angela Mary Culme-Seymour (1912–2012), daughter of George Culme-Seymour and Janet (née Orr-Ewing) and former wife of the artist John Spencer-Churchill. Having been separated by World War II when Balfour was posted to Cairo, she started a five-year relationship with Major Robert Hewer-Hewitt with whom she had two sons, Mark and Johnny. Patrick and Angela divorced in 1942.

Despite the brief marriage, Lord Kinross was homosexual; he had no issue and was succeeded by his brother David Andrew Balfour, 4th Baron Kinross.

He is buried in "Lords Row" in Dean Cemetery, Edinburgh, with all previous ancestors of the title Baron Kinross.

== In popular culture ==
In 1974 John Betjeman wrote the poem For Patrick: aetat LXX published in his A Nip in the Air, with a footnote giving Balfour's name and title.

== Books ==
- Society Racket: A Critical Survey of Modern Social Life (1933)
- The Ruthless Innocent (1949) Supposedly based on the character of Angela Culme-Seymour
- The Orphaned Realm: Journeys in Cyprus (1951)
- Within the Taurus: A Journey in Asiatic Turkey (1954)
- Portrait of Greece (1956) With photographs in colour by Dimitri
- Europa Minor: Journeys in Coastal Turkey (1956)
- The Kindred Spirit: A History of Gin and of the House of Booth (1959)
- The Innocents at Home (1959) An account of the author's travels in the United States of America
- Atatürk: The Rebirth of a Nation (1964) reprinted 2001
  - (US ed.) Atatürk: A Biography of Mustafa Kemal, Father of Modern Turkey (1965)
- Portrait of Egypt (1966)
- The Windsor Years: The Life of Edward, as Prince of Wales, King, and Duke of Windsor (1967)
- Between Two Seas: The Creation of the Suez Canal (1968)
- Hagia Sophia, (1971) published by Newsweek
- Ottoman Centuries: The Rise and Fall of the Turkish Empire (1977) ISBN 0-688-08093-6
- Hagia Sophia: A History of Constantinople (1979) ISBN 9780882250151

Peerage of the United Kingdom
Preceded by Patrick Balfour	Baron Kinross; 1939–1976	Succeeded by David Balfour
