= Inverchaolain Church =

- Inverchaolain Parish Church
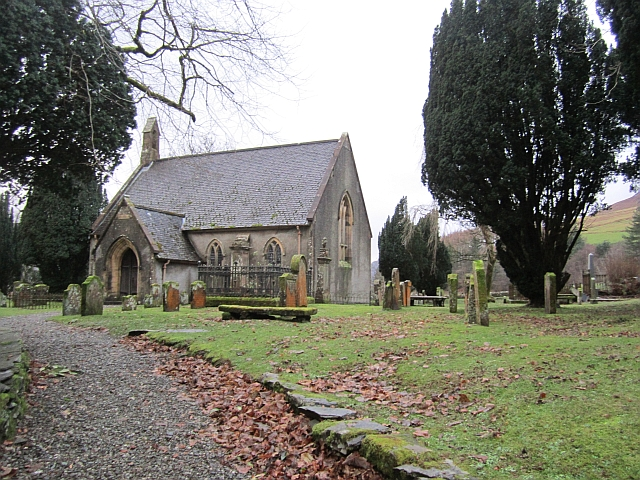
- The church in 2012, its centenary year, looking north
- Inverchaolain Church
- 55°55′59″N 5°03′28″W
- Location: Glenstriven Road, Inverchaolain, Argyll and Bute
- Country: Scotland
- Denomination: Church of Scotland

History
- Status: closed

Architecture
- Functional status: disused
- Years built: 1912 (114 years ago)
- Closed: 1990 (36 years ago)

Inverchaolain Church is a former Church of Scotland church building in Inverchaolain, Argyll and Bute, Scotland. Located on the eastern shores of Loch Striven, just north of Inverchaolain Burn, the church was built in 1912. It is the fourth church on the site. There is a possibility that the second church, rumoured to be dedicated to Saint Bridget, was located about 200 metres (660 ft) northeast of the present structure.

When the foundations of the previous church were dug in 1812, several dozen human skulls were uncovered, as well as a few bones of very large size. Argyll and Bute Council have listed a claymore stone, an ancient tombstone with a Gaelic inscription and a coping stone from the pre-Reformation church, as being in an around the property.

The church closed in 1990.

== Graveyard ==
The graveyard contains burials and headstones from previous incarnations of the church. There were around 230 gravestones as of 2014, the earliest dating to 1732.

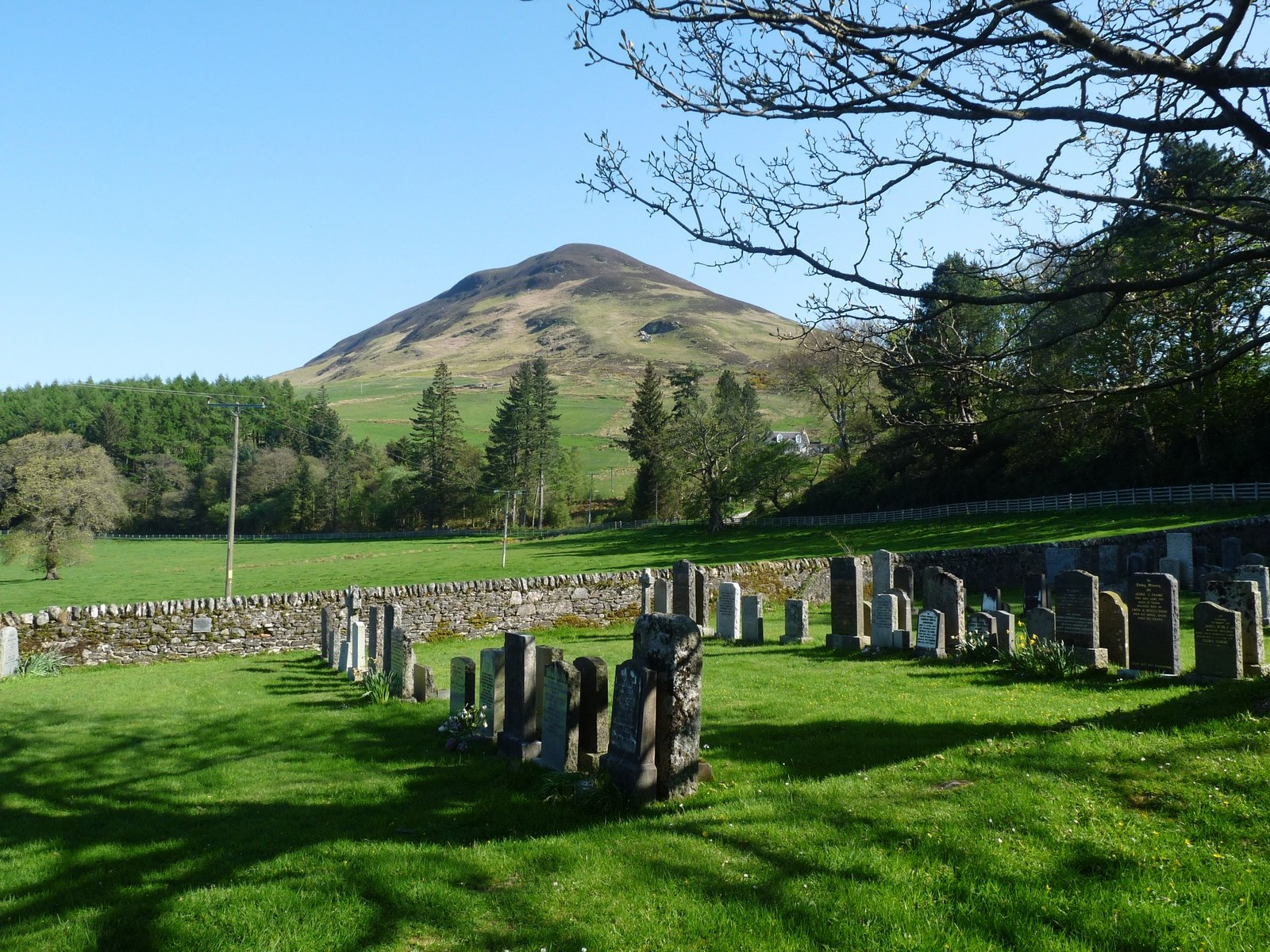
Looking north to Sron Dearg

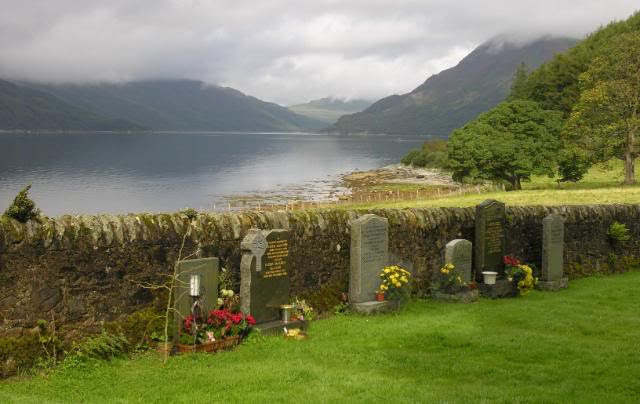
A view up the northern section of Loch Striven

== Bibliography ==
- County Council of Argyll. (1914) List of ancient monuments and historic buildings in the county of Argyll. [s.l.]. Page(s): 20 RCAHMS Shelf Number: D.11.11.COU
- NSA. (1834-1845) The new statistical account of Scotland by the ministers of the respective parishes under the superintendence of a committee of the society for the benefit of the sons and daughters of the clergy, 15v. Edinburgh. Page(s): Vol. 7, (Argyll) 112, 113 RCAHMS Shelf Number: B.2.2.STA
- RCAHMS. (1992a) The Royal Commission on the Ancient and Historical Monuments of Scotland. Argyll: An inventory of the monuments: Volume 7: Mid-Argyll and Cowal: Medieval and later monuments. {Edinburgh}. Page(s): 80-1, No. 40 RCAHMS Shelf Number: A.1.1.INV/25
