= Arthur Johnstone-Douglas =

Scottish soldier and politician (1846–1923)

Arthur Henry Johnstone-Douglas JP DL (23 June 1846 – 26 March 1923) was a Scottish soldier and politician.

== Early life ==
Johnstone-Douglas was born on 23 June 1846 into Clan Douglas. He was the son of Robert Johnstone-Douglas of Lockerbie (1814–1866) and Lady Jane Margaret Mary Douglas (d. 1881), who were first cousins. Among his siblings were Grace Elizabeth Johnstone-Douglas (wife of William Edwardes, 4th Baron Kensington, as well as the senior female-line descendant of Sarah Churchill, Duchess of Marlborough), Alice Louisa Johnstone-Douglas (wife of Charles Stewart), and Cecil Francis Johnstone-Douglas, a Lieutenant-Colonel in the 5th Lancers who died unmarried.

His paternal grandfather, Henry Alexander Douglas, was a younger brother of his maternal grandfather Charles Douglas, 6th Marquess of Queensberry, as well as a younger brother of the 7th Marquess of Queensberry and Lord William Douglas, MP for Dumfries Burghs (all sons of Sir William Douglas, 4th Baronet and the former Grace Johnstone). His uncle, John Douglas, served as the 7th Premier of Queensland. His paternal grandmother was Elizabeth Dalzell, a daughter of Robert Dalzell, (Note: Johnstone-Douglas' great-grandfather, Robert Dalzell (1755–1808), would have become the 7th Earl of Carnwath in 1787, but for his grandfather's 1717 attainder.) and his maternal grandmother, Lady Caroline Scott, was the third daughter of Henry Scott, 3rd Duke of Buccleuch.

== Career ==
After residing at Comlongon Castle, he succeeded to Lockerbie House, a mansion in Dryfesdale, in Dumfriesshire, Scotland, in 1866 (upon the death of his father), together with 2336 acres, valued at £3345 per annum. He was then Lord of the Barony of Lockerbie.

From 1866 to 1877, he served in the 42nd Highlanders, a Scottish infantry regiment in the British Army, retiring as a Lieutenant, later serving as a Lieutenant in the Border Mounted Rifles and Captain of the Dumfriesshire Mounted Volunteers. He held the office of Justice of the Peace for Dumfries and served as Deputy Lieutenant of Dumfries.

Johnstone-Douglas served as Convenor of the County (the chairman of the county council, elected by the members) from 1894 to 1896 and again from 1902 to 1910, as well as Chairman of the Territorial Association.

== Personal life ==
On 14 July 1869, Johnstone-Douglas married Jane Maitland Hathorn-Stewart, a daughter of Stair Hathorn-Stewart of Physgill and Glasserton and, (Note: Jane's father, Stair Hathorn-Stewart, Esq. of Physgill, had previously been married to Helen Sinclair, a daughter of Sir John Sinclair, 1st Baronet.) his third wife, Jane Rothes Maitland (a granddaughter of Sir William Maxwell, 4th Baronet). Jane's eldest sister, Mary Stewart, was the wife of Sir William Baillie, 2nd Baronet. They lived at Lockerbie House and were the parents of:

- Sibyl Johnstone-Douglas (1870–1953), who died unmarried.
- Robert Sholto Johnstone-Douglas (1871–1958), who married Bettina Grisewood, a daughter of Harman Grisewood, of Daylesford, Gloucestershire, in 1913.
- Margaret Jean Johnstone-Douglas (1872–1960), who married the Hon. Douglas Carnegie, MP for Winchester and a son of George Carnegie, 9th Earl of Northesk, in 1894.
- Muriel Grace Johnstone-Douglas (1874–1961), who married Lord Lt. Charles Henry Scott-Plummer, son of Charles Scott Plummer, in 1908.
- Bridget Helen Johnstone-Douglas (1875–1967), who died unmarried.
- Olive Christian Johnstone-Douglas (1878–1977), who married Lt.-Col. Francis John Carruthers, Lord Lieutenant of Dumfries, in 1905.
- Caroline Elsie Johnstone-Douglas (1879–1969), who married Patrick Balfour, 2nd Baron Kinross, eldest son of John Balfour, 1st Baron Kinross, in 1903.
- Octavia Johnstone-Douglas (1881–1968), a twin who married Maj. Carleton Salkeld in 1908.
- Nina Johnstone-Douglas (1881–1964), a twin who married Stair Agnew Gillon, son of Andrew Gillon, 10th of Walhouse, in 1919.
- Walter Henry George Johnstone-Douglas (1886–1972), the founder and director of Webber Douglas School of Singing and Dramatic Art; he died unmarried.

Johnstone-Douglas died on 26 March 1923, at age 76, and was buried in Dryfebridge cemetery.

=== Descendants ===
Through his son Sholto, he was a grandfather of Elizabeth Johnstone-Douglas, who married William Craven, 6th Earl of Craven and was the mother of the 7th and 8th Earls of Craven.

Through his daughter Margaret, he was a grandfather of John Carnegie, 12th Earl of Northesk.

Through his daughter Caroline, he was a grandfather of Patrick Balfour, 3rd Baron Kinross and David Balfour, 4th Baron Kinross.

Through his daughter Octavia, he was a grandfather of actress Catherine Salkeld.
