= Andrew Murray, 1st Viscount Dunedin =

British politician and judge (1849–1942)

The Right Honourable The Viscount Dunedin GCVO PC
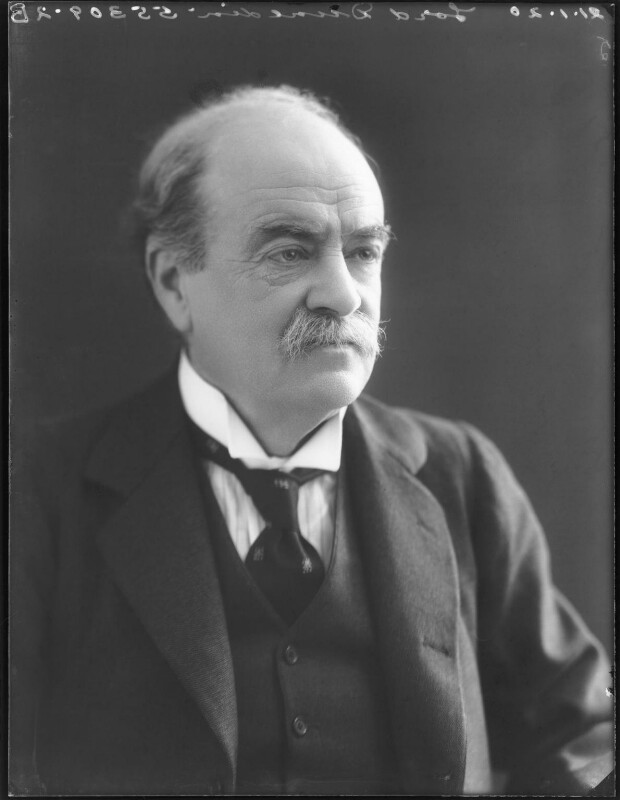
- Dunedin in 1920

Secretary for Scotland
- In office 9 October 1903 – 2 February 1905
- Monarch: Edward VII
- Prime Minister: Arthur Balfour
- Preceded by: The Lord Balfour of Burleigh
- Succeeded by: The Marquess of Linlithgow

Lord Justice General
- In office 1905–1913
- Monarchs: Edward VII; George V
- Preceded by: Lord Balfour
- Succeeded by: Alexander Ure

Personal details
- Born: 21 November 1849
- Died: 21 August 1942 (aged 92)
- Party: Conservative
- Spouse(s): (1) Mary Edmonstone (1857–1922) (2) Jean Elmslie Henderson Findlay (1885-1944)
- Education: Trinity College, Cambridge

Andrew Graham Murray, 1st Viscount Dunedin, GCVO, PC (21 November 1849 – 21 August 1942) was a Scottish politician and judge. He served as Secretary for Scotland between 1903 and 1905, as Lord Justice General and Lord President of the Court of Session between 1905 and 1913 and as a Lord of Appeal in Ordinary between 1913 and 1932.

== Background and education ==
Murray was the son of Thomas Graham Murray WS LLD (1816-1891) and Caroline Jane Tod, daughter of John Tod. His father and grandfather were solicitors, and founding partners of the Edinburgh firm Tods Murray & Jamieson. He was educated at Harrow and Trinity College, Cambridge.

== Political and legal career, 1891–1905 ==
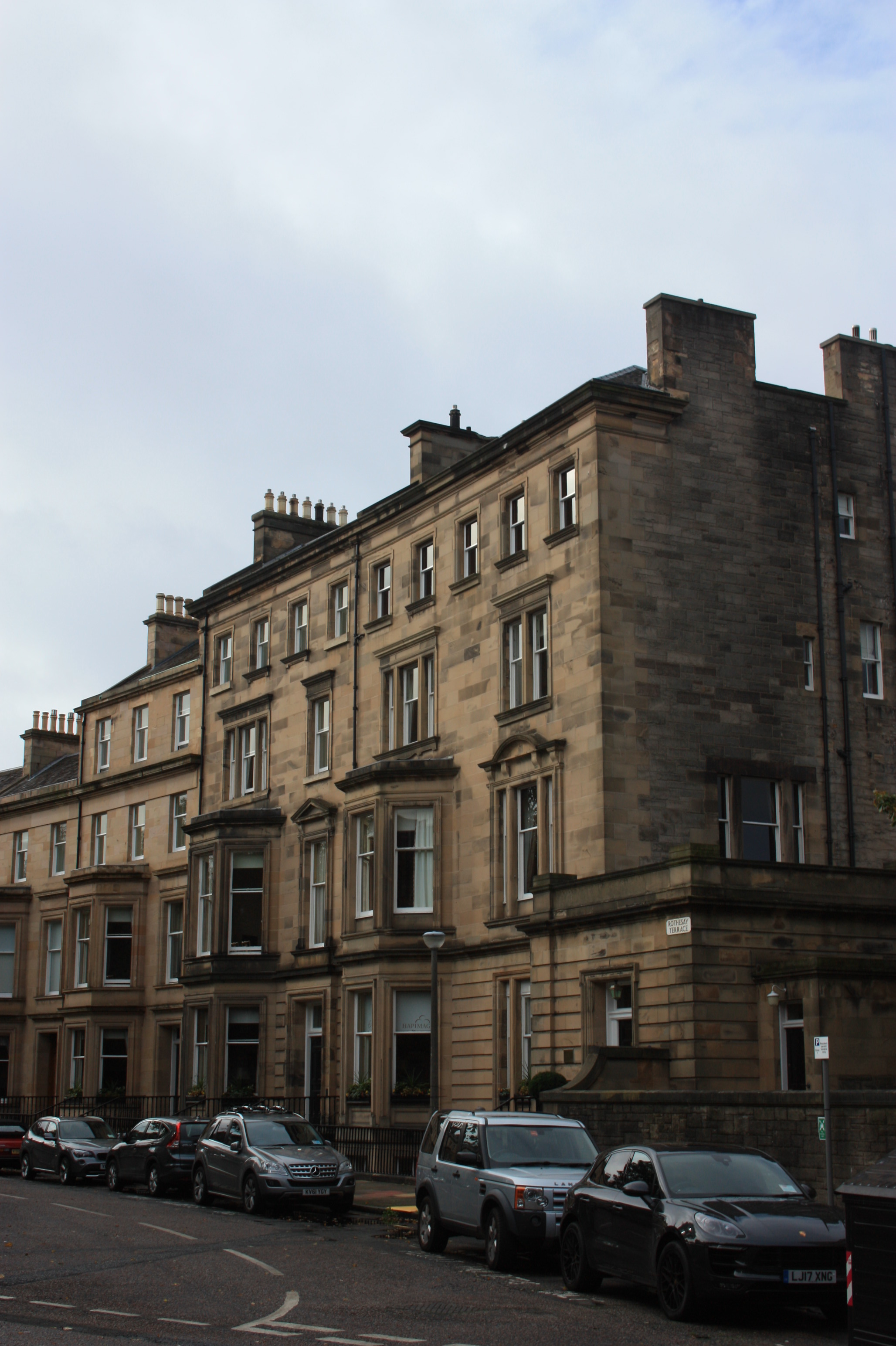
7 Rothesay Terrace, Edinburgh (right)

Murray was called to the Scottish Bar in 1874 and became a Queen's Counsel in 1891. The latter year he was also elected Member of Parliament for Bute, a seat he held until 1905, and appointed Solicitor General for Scotland in Lord Salisbury's Conservative administration. The Conservatives lost power in 1892 but when they returned to office in 1895 under Salisbury, Murray was once again made Solicitor-General for Scotland.

In 1896, he was promoted to Lord Advocate and sworn of the Privy Council. He remained as Lord Advocate when Arthur Balfour became Prime Minister in 1902, but the following year he succeeded Lord Balfour of Burleigh as Secretary for Scotland, with a seat in the cabinet.

In 1900, he was living at 7 Rothesay Terrace in Edinburgh's fashionable West End.

== Judicial career, 1905–1932 ==
Murray left the government and parliament in February 1905, on being appointed Lord Justice General and Lord President of the Court of Session. He was raised to the peerage as Baron Dunedin, of Stenton in the County of Perth, on 9 March 1905. He held these posts until 1913, when he was appointed a Lord of Appeal in Ordinary.

During his tenure as a Law Lord he gave long majority judgments in cases including Metropolitan Water Board v Dick Kerr & Co Ltd concerning frustration and Tredegar v. Harwood concerning a landlord's liability to insure premises, Ellerman Lines Ltd v Murray on employment law and excessive reliance on a preamble or draft international instrument, Sorrel v Smith concerning the tort of conspiracy to interfere with a trade or calling, Leyland Shipping Co Ltd v Norwich Union Fire Insurance Society Ltd on causation in tort, Dunlop Pneumatic Tyre Co Ltd v New Garage & Motor Co Ltd on penalty clauses and Plumb v Cobden Flour Mills Co Ltd on employer's liability. In 1923 he was chairman of the Political Honours Review Committee. He retired as a Law Lord in 1932.

Apart from his legal and political career, Lord Dunedin was Sheriff of Perthshire between 1890 and 1891 and Lord Lieutenant of Buteshire between 1901 and 1905. He was appointed a Knight Commander of the Royal Victorian Order in 1908 and a Knight Grand Cross of the Royal Victorian Order in 1922. In 1926 he was further honoured when he was made Viscount Dunedin, of Stenton in the County of Perth.

== Family ==
Lord Dunedin was twice married. He married firstly Mary Clementina, daughter of Admiral Sir William Edmonstone, 4th Baronet, in 1874. They had one son and three daughters:

- Hon. Ronald Thomas Graham Murray (1875–1934), a major in the Black Watch who fought in the First World War. He married in a large society wedding in St George's church, Hanover Square on 19 February 1903 Eva Baird, daughter of Sir David Baird, 3rd Baronet and Hon. Lady Baird (née Ellen Stuart), daughter and heiress of Charles Stuart, 12th Lord Blantyre. He died childless in September 1934, aged 59, predeceasing his father by eight years.
- Hon. Mary Caroline Graham Murray
- Hon. Gladys Esmé Graham Murray (b.1882)
- Hon. Marjorie Graham Murray (b.1886); married in 1907 Major Edward Leyland Cooke Feilden, of the Feilden baronets.

After his first wife Mary's death in December 1922 Lord Dunedin married secondly in 1923 Jean Elmslie Henderson Findlay, secretary of the Scottish War Savings Committee in WW1, and daughter of George Findlay. They had no children.

Lord Dunedin died in August 1942, aged 92. As he had no surviving male issue both his titles became extinct on his death.

Parliament of the United Kingdom
Preceded by James Robertson	Member of Parliament for Buteshire; 1891–1905	Succeeded by Norman Lamont
Legal offices
Preceded by Charles Pearson	Solicitor General for Scotland; 1891–1892	Succeeded by Alexander Asher
Preceded by Thomas Shaw	Solicitor General for Scotland; 1895–1896	Succeeded by Charles Dickson
Preceded by Charles Pearson	Lord Advocate; 1896–1903	Succeeded by Charles Dickson
Preceded by Lord Balfour	Lord Justice General; 1905–1913	Succeeded by Alexander Ure
Political offices
Preceded by The Lord Balfour of Burleigh	Secretary for Scotland; 1903–1905	Succeeded by The Marquess of Linlithgow
Honorary titles
Preceded by The 3rd Marquess of Bute	Lord Lieutenant of Buteshire; 1901–1905	Succeeded by The 4th Marquess of Bute
Peerage of the United Kingdom
New creation	Viscount Dunedin; 1926–1942	Extinct
New creation	Baron Dunedin; 1905–1942	Extinct
