= 1905 Buteshire by-election =

UK parliamentary by-election

The 1905 Buteshire by-election was a by-election held on 3 March 1905 for the British House of Commons constituency of Buteshire.

== Vacancy ==
The election was triggered by the resignation of the sitting Conservative MP, Andrew Murray. Murray held the post of Secretary for Scotland with a seat in the Cabinet. In January 1905, Murray was appointed Lord Justice General and Lord President of the Court of Session and was given a seat in the House of Lords. At the previous General Election, he had withstood the Liberal challenge:

General election 1900: Buteshire
Party	Candidate	Votes	%	±%
Conservative	Andrew Murray	1,241	54.3	N/A
Liberal	Norman Lamont	1,046	45.7	New
Majority		195	8.6	N/A
Turnout		2.287	67.0	N/A
Conservative hold		Swing	N/A	

== Candidates ==
=== Unionists ===
The Conservative Party selected Edward Theodore Salvesen, the Solicitor General for Scotland, as their candidate. Salvesen had fought the Leith Burghs seat as a Unionist at the general election of 1900.

=== Liberals ===
The Liberals re-selected their candidate from the 1900 general election Norman Lamont. Lamont came from a prominent and wealthy local family with lands in Argyll and a plantation in Trinidad. His father had been Liberal MP for Buteshire from 1865 to 1868.

=== Tariff Reform candidate ===
It was reported that at one time it looked likely there would be a three-cornered contest. A Mr. Sinclair, a convinced tariff reformer had issued an address to the electors as soon it had become known there was a Parliamentary vacancy. However Sinclair decided not to stand. It soon became clear that his supporters were content with the selection of Salvesen by the Tories as he was a member of the Tariff Reform League and had stated that if necessary he would be prepared to see the policy of Joseph Chamberlain on Imperial Preference adopted in full measure.

== Issues ==
=== Tariff Reform ===
Salvesen took advantage of his position as a Tariff Reformer to consolidate his support among the Unionist voters. A significant number of Buteshire electors were middle-class merchants and others doing business in Glasgow but who had villa residences in towns in the constituency like Rothesay and Millport and a good number were Unionist supporters who were generally favourable to tariff reform. Conservative efforts to win the election was particularly focused on these voters as it was felt that apathy in this key part of the electorate had been responsible for the narrowness of Graham's win over Lamont at the 1900 general election. Lamont campaigned as a traditional Liberal free trader, although he was challenged on his previous support for a form of retaliatory duty to protect West Indian sugar producers from unfair foreign competition, which policy he now renounced.

=== Chinese labour ===
After the Boer War the government of Arthur Balfour had agreed to let the owners of the South African gold mines bring in thousands of indentured labourers of Chinese ethnicity to work in the mines. They lived under harsh conditions, in compounds they were not allowed to leave, worked long hours for little reward and were subject to corporal punishment. The issue was taken up by the Liberal Party under the slogan of 'Chinese slavery' both as a crusade for humanitarianism but also to exploit fear amongst British workers that the Conservative government might allow similar immigration to Britain, threatening British jobs. The issue was raised in Buteshire but was given an added salience because it was alleged against Lamont that the Coolie labour (as it was referred to in Edwardian times) on his West Indian property were similarly indentured and that it was hypocritical of him to object to the practice in the Transvaal. Lamont was able to deflect this attack by showing he had removed the indenture system when he succeeded to the property and that the workers were now retained in an arrangement akin to being tenant farmers. His supporters also made political capital from the fact that Lamont had been the subject of what they chose to characterise as an unwarranted and brutal assault.

=== Home Rule ===
The question of Irish Home Rule was an ever-present in the election. The letter of support which Balfour sent to Salvesen for publication highlighted the difference between the parties on this issue. Lamont seemed to think Balfour's intervention on Home Rule strengthened the Liberal vote however. He was said to have received the votes of the Irish catholic electors, who numbered around 200.

=== Other issues ===
Apart from the specific points of conflict mentioned above, the by-election was fought principally on the basis of the government candidate defending the government record and the opposition candidate promoting the need for change.

== Result ==
The result of the by-election was a gain for the Liberals, albeit by a narrow margin. Lamont turned a Unionist majority of 195 at the previous general election into a Liberal majority of 34.

Bute by-election, 1905 Electorate
Party	Candidate	Votes	%	±%
Liberal	Norman Lamont	1,460	50.6	+4.9
Conservative	Edward Theodore Salvesen	1,426	49.4	−4.9
Majority		34	1.2	N/A
Turnout		2,886	80.7	+13.7
Liberal gain from Conservative		Swing	+4.9	

In this context Lamont's collection of the Irish vote seems particularly significant and perhaps the resolve of this constituency to come out and vote on the issue of Home Rule was stiffened by Balfour's focussing on it in his letter of support to Salvesen. However, Salvesen stated after the election that the Unionist vote had polled at its full strength and Buteshire should be seen in the context of the general political trend of the time which since 1902 had been decidedly against the government. Buteshire was the fifteenth by-election gain by the Liberals from the Conservatives since 1902. The government, which had been in office since 1895, was widely seen as tired and divided and the Liberal opposition was united around key policies on free trade and education, as well as being sustained by a new approach to questions of social reform, the New Liberalism of thinkers such as Thomas Hill Green, Leonard Trelawny Hobhouse and J A Hobson as well as by dynamic, radical politicians such as David Lloyd George and Winston Churchill who had defected from the Tories in 1904.

== Aftermath ==
General election 1906: Buteshire
Party	Candidate	Votes	%	±%
Liberal	Norman Lamont	1,637	51.9	+1.3
Conservative	G. Speir	1,517	48.1	−1.3
Majority		120	3.8	N/A
Turnout		3.154	82.7	+2.0
Liberal gain from Conservative		Swing		
