= Jean Elmslie Henderson Findlay =

Jean Elmslie Henderson Findlay CBE
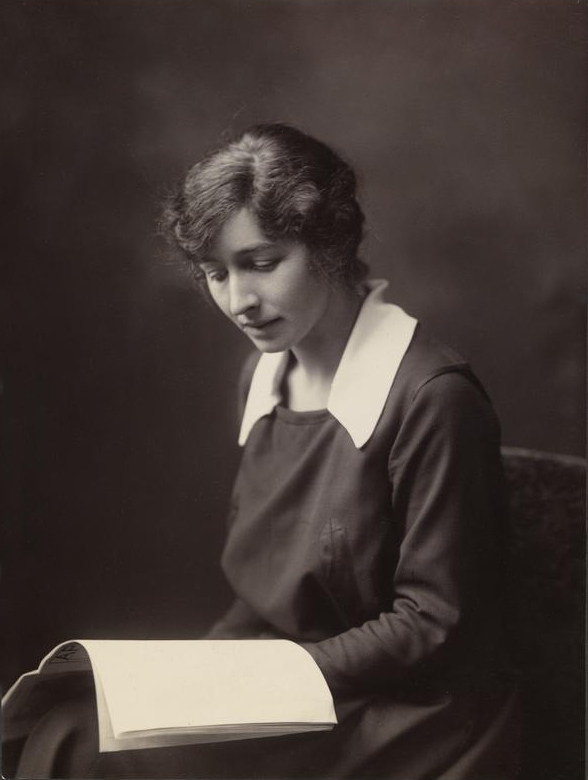
- Jean Elmslie Henderson Findlay, from a 1920 photograph in the collection of the Imperial War Museums.
- Born: 25 December 1885; Aberdeen
- Died: 20 March 1944 (aged 58)
- Other names: J. E. H. Findlay, Jane Murray
- Occupation(s): Writer, war worker
- Spouse: Andrew Murray, 1st Viscount Dunedin

Jane (Jean) Elmslie Henderson Findlay CBE (25 December 1885 – 20 March 1944). was a Scottish author and editor. She was secretary of the Scottish War Savings Committee during World War I, and an editor of Everyman magazine.

== Early life ==
Jean Henderson Findlay, the daughter of the Aberdeen hat merchant George Findlay and Jane Elmslie Henderson, was born in Aberdeen, Scotland. Her father died in May 1885, seven months before her birth; her mother died in early January 1886, two weeks after giving birth. In a court case later that year, to claim a third of her father's estate, her curator at litem was Harry Cheyne; the claim was repelled.

== Career ==
In 1914, Findlay began writing a contributor to the journal Everyman, and was a war correspondent from Flanders. She published a translation of Pierre Nothomb's The Barbarians in Belgium, and made a lecture tour of Canada in 1915, to raise funds for war relief in Belgium. For her efforts, she received the Queen Elisabeth Medal from the Belgian government.

Findlay was acting editor of Everyman from 1915 to 1917. In 1918, her translation of Émile Vandervelde's Three Aspects of the Russian Revolution was published. From 1916 to 1923, she was director of the Scottish War Savings Committee. She was made a Commander of the Order of the British Empire (CBE) in 1920, for her contributions to the war effort.

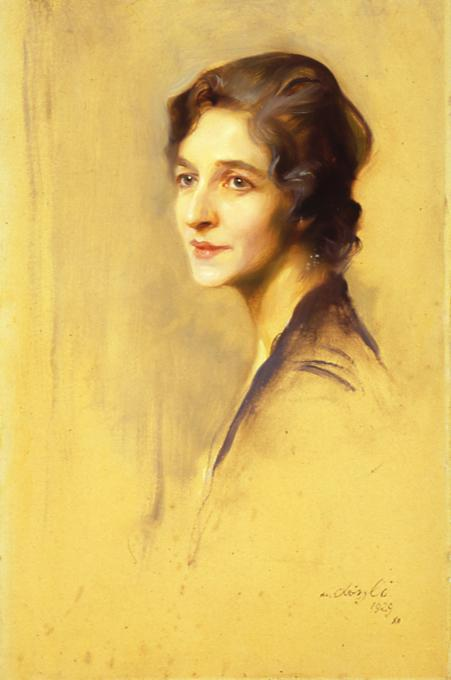
Viscountess Dunedin by Philip Alexius de Lombos Laszlo (1929), Aberdeen Archives, Gallery & Museums Collection

In 1926, she became the first Viscountess Dunedin, when her husband became a Viscount. She spoke at a meeting of the Manchester Publicity Association in 1930, on the limitations of advertising. Also in 1930, she traveled with her husband to visit Freeman Freeman-Thomas, the Governor-General of Canada, and attend meetings of the Canadian Bar Association and American Bar Association. She returned to the editor's position at Everyman for a year, from 1933 to 1934.

== Personal life ==
In 1923, Jean Henderson Findlay married widower Andrew Graham Murray, 1st Viscount Dunedin, a Scottish politician, and judge, as his second spouse. They had no children and the title died with their deaths. Jean Henderson Findlay was widowed when Murray died in 1942, and she died from cancer in London in 1944, aged 58 years.
