= Tods Murray =

Tods Murray LLP WS
- Company type: Limited liability partnership
- Industry: Commercial law
- Founded: Edinburgh, 1856
- Founder: Andrew Jamieson; John Tod; John Robert Tod; Thomas Graham Murray
- Headquarters: Edinburgh Quay, Fountainbridge, Edinburgh
- Area served: Scotland
- Services: Legal advice
- Revenue: £13.1m (2011)
- Website: www.todsmurray.com

Tods Murray LLP WS was a mid-tier Scottish commercial legal firm with offices in Edinburgh and Glasgow and 2011 turnover of £13.1m, placing it at number 144 in The Lawyer magazine's list of the two hundred largest UK firms. The firm appointed administrators on 3 October 2014 and the firm was bought out by Shepherd and Wedderburn.

== Practice ==
The firm's practice areas included Banking and Finance, Bribery Consultancy, Charity Law, Construction, Corporate, Employment, Environment and Climate Change, Family, Hospitality and Leisure, IT/IP/Media, Litigation and Dispute Resolution, Planning and Development, Private Client, Projects, Real Estate, Recovery and Insolvency, Renewable Energy, Residential Property, Rural Property and Business, Social Housing, Sports Law, and Tax.

It was rated by legal directory Chambers and Partners as a Band 1 firm for Media & Entertainment and Partnership, and Band 2 for Banking & Finance and Healthcare, and by Legal500 as a first tier firm in Technology, Media & Telecoms, and as a second tier firm for Social Housing and for Edinburgh and Glasgow Commercial Property.

== Locations ==
The firm had its head office in the Edinburgh Quay development between Lochrin and Fountainbridge in Edinburgh, and an office on Bothwell Street in the centre of Glasgow.

== History ==
The 'Tods' of the name is a plural, the firm having begun life in 1856 as the partnership of John Tod WS and his son John Robert Tod WS, along with Thomas Graham Murray WS and Andrew Jamieson SSC. The firm's original name was Tods Murray & Jamieson. Thomas Murray was in fact married to Caroline Tod, the daughter of the elder John Tod. Murray's son, Andrew Murray, 1st Viscount Dunedin, became Secretary of State for Scotland (1903–05), Lord President (1905-13) and a Lord of Appeal in Ordinary (1913–32). Of the four partners, three were Writers to the Signet while one was a Solicitor in the Supreme Courts. In 2012, at least half of the firms partners were Writers to the Signet.

The firm was based for over one hundred years on Edinburgh's Queen Street, a popular area for solicitors' firms, but moved in 2005 to the new Edinburgh Quay development in the city's regenerated Fountainbridge business district. In 1999, it opened an additional office in Glasgow. In March 2004, it became a limited liability partnership.

The firm merged with Edinburgh-based private client law firm, Fyfe Ireland, in January 2012.

In January 2013, the firm suffered a "sharp fall in profit and fee income" caused by a lack of confidence in the Scottish real estate market and reduced borrowing opportunities following the Great Recession. Executive partner, David Dunsire, stated that he was confident that the firm would ”emerge from this recession stronger and fitter as we have done with others during our 150 year history”.

Tods Murray entered into administration in October 2014, weeks after appointing a new partner to its real estate finance team. Approximately 50 jobs were lost as a result, following the merger with Shepherd & Wedderburn. The firm had around £5 million in debts at the time of administration, including £2 million owed to the Royal Bank of Scotland.
