= Baron Kinross =

Title in the Peerage of the United Kingdom

Arms of Balfour, Baron Kinross: Ermine, on a chevron sable between in chief two torteaux and in base an open book, an otter's head erased proper

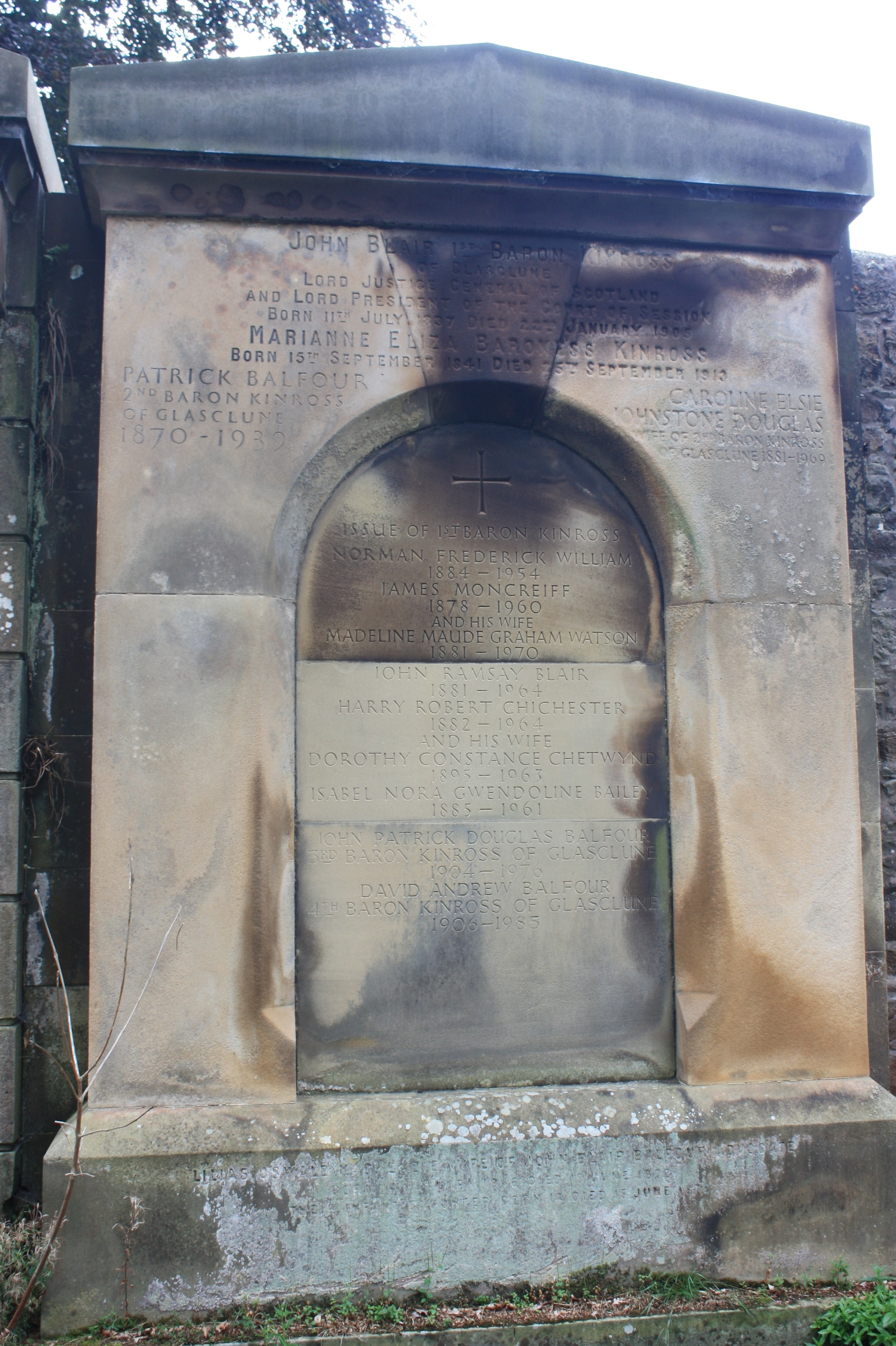
Baron Kinross monument, Dean Cemetery

Baron Kinross, of Glasclune in the County of Haddington, is a title in the Peerage of the United Kingdom. It was created on 15 July 1902 for Scottish lawyer John Balfour, Liberal politician and Lord President of the Court of Session. His grandson, the third baron, was an author and journalist. As of 2019 the title is held by the latter's nephew, the fifth baron, who succeeded his father in 1985.

All four deceased barons are buried at the south end of Lords Row in Dean Cemetery, Edinburgh.

== Barons Kinross (1902) ==
- John Balfour, 1st Baron Kinross (1837–1905)
- Patrick Balfour, 2nd Baron Kinross (1870–1939)
- (John) Patrick Douglas Balfour, 3rd Baron Kinross (1904–1976)
- David Andrew Balfour, 4th Baron Kinross (1906–1985)
- Christopher Patrick Balfour, 5th Baron Kinross (b. 1949)

The heir apparent is the present holder's son, Alan Ian Balfour (b. 1978).
