= Buteshire (UK Parliament constituency) =

Parliamentary constituency in the United Kingdom, 1832–1918

- Former county constituency for the House of Commons

1708–1918
- Created from: Buteshire
- Replaced by: Bute and Northern Ayrshire

Buteshire was a county constituency of the House of Commons of the Parliament of Great Britain from 1708 to 1800 and of the Parliament of the United Kingdom from 1801 to 1918.

== Creation ==
The British parliamentary constituency was created in 1708 following the Acts of Union, 1707 and replaced the former Parliament of Scotland shire constituency of Buteshire.

== History ==
From 1708 to 1832 Buteshire and Caithness were paired as alternating constituencies: one of the constituencies elected a Member of Parliament (MP) to one parliament, the other to the next. The areas which were covered by the two constituencies are quite remote from each other, Caithness in the northeast of Scotland and Buteshire in the southwest.

From 1832 to 1918, Buteshire was represented continuously by its own MP.

== Boundaries ==
From 1708 to 1832, the Buteshire constituency covered the county of Bute (which historically included the islands of Arran, Great Cumbrae and Little Cumbrae) minus the parliamentary burgh of Rothesay, which was a component of the Ayr Burghs constituency. In 1832, Rothesay was merged into the Buteshire constituency.

By 1892, Bute had become a local government county and, throughout Scotland, under the Local Government (Scotland) Act 1889, county boundaries had been redefined for all purposes except parliamentary representation. 26 years were to elapse before constituency boundaries were redrawn, by the Representation of the People Act 1918, to take account of new local government boundaries.

In 1918, the Bute and Northern Ayrshire county constituency was created, to cover the county of Bute and a northern portion of the county of Ayr. The rest of the county of Ayr was divided between three other constituencies, all entirely within the county: the county constituencies of South Ayrshire and Kilmarnock, and a remodelled Ayr Burghs.

== Members of Parliament ==
=== MPs 1708 to 1832 ===
Election	Member	Party
1708	Dugald Stewart	
1710	John Montgomerie	
1710	none	
1713	John Campbell, later Duke of Argyll	Whig
1715	none	
1722	Patrick Campbell	
1727	none	
1734	Patrick Campbell	
1741	none	
1747	James Stuart-Mackenzie	
1754	none	
1761	James Stuart I	
1762	Henry Wauchope	
1768	none	
1774	James Stuart II (later Stuart-Wortley-Mackenzie)	
1780	none	
1784	James Stuart II	
1790	none	
1796	Frederick Stuart	
1802	none	
1806	James Stuart-Wortley-Mackenzie	
1807	none	
1812	John Marjoribanks	
1818	none	
1820	Lord Patrick Crichton-Stuart	Whig
1826	none	
1830	Sir William Rae, 3rd Baronet	Tory
1831	none	

=== MPs 1832 to 1918 ===
Election	Member	Party
1832	Charles Stuart	Conservative
1833 by-election	Sir William Rae	Conservative
1842 by-election	James Stuart-Wortley	Conservative
1852	James Stuart-Wortley	Peelite
1859	David Mure	Conservative
1865 by-election	George Boyle	Conservative
1865	James Lamont	Liberal
1868	Charles Dalrymple	Conservative
1880	Thomas Russell	Liberal
1880 by-election	Charles Dalrymple	Conservative
1885	James Robertson	Conservative
1891 by-election	Andrew Murray	Conservative
1905	Norman Lamont	Liberal
January 1910	Sir Harry Hope	Conservative
1918	constituency abolished	

== Election results ==
=== Elections in the 1830s ===
General election 1830: Buteshire
Party	Candidate	Votes	%
Tory	William Rae	Unopposed	
Registered electors		21	
Tory gain from Nonpartisan			

- Gain from Non Partisan at Caithness, which returned the 1826 MP as this seat's alternating pair

For the 1831 election, Caithness returned the MP.

General election 1832: Buteshire
Party	Candidate	Votes	%
Tory	Charles Stuart	Unopposed	
Registered electors		279	
Tory win (new seat)			

- Considered a 'new seat' as the constituency did not elect an MP in 1831

Stuart resigned, causing a by-election.

By-election, 4 September 1833: Buteshire
Party	Candidate	Votes	%
Tory	William Rae	Unopposed	
Tory hold			

General election 1835: Buteshire
Party	Candidate	Votes	%
Conservative	William Rae	Unopposed	
Registered electors		310	
Conservative hold			

General election 1837: Buteshire
Party	Candidate	Votes	%
Conservative	William Rae	Unopposed	
Registered electors		345	
Conservative hold			

=== Elections in the 1840s ===
General election 1841: Buteshire
Party	Candidate	Votes	%	±%
Conservative	William Rae	134	65.0	N/A
Conservative	Henry Dunlop	72	35.0	N/A
Majority		62	30.0	N/A
Turnout		206	54.2	N/A
Registered electors		380		
Conservative hold		Swing	N/A	

Rae was appointed Lord Advocate, requiring a by-election.

By-election, 23 September 1841: Buteshire
Party	Candidate	Votes	%	±%
Conservative	William Rae	Unopposed		
Conservative hold				

Rae's death caused a by-election.

By-election, 1 December 1842: Buteshire
Party	Candidate	Votes	%	±%
Conservative	James Stuart-Wortley	Unopposed		
Conservative hold				

Stuart-Wortley was appointed Judge Advocate General of the Armed Forces, requiring a by-election.

By-election, 7 February 1846: Buteshire
Party	Candidate	Votes	%	±%
Conservative	James Stuart-Wortley	Unopposed		
Conservative hold				

General election 1847: Buteshire
Party	Candidate	Votes	%	±%
Conservative	James Stuart-Wortley	Unopposed		
Registered electors		410		
Conservative hold				

=== Elections in the 1850s ===
General election 1852: Buteshire
Party	Candidate	Votes	%	±%
Peelite	James Stuart-Wortley	Unopposed		
Registered electors		491		
Peelite gain from Conservative				

Stuart-Wortley was appointed Solicitor General for England and Wales, requiring a by-election.

By-election, 12 February 1857: Buteshire
Party	Candidate	Votes	%	±%
Peelite	James Stuart-Wortley	Unopposed		
Peelite hold				

General election 1857: Buteshire
Party	Candidate	Votes	%	±%
Peelite	James Stuart-Wortley	Unopposed		
Registered electors		489		
Peelite hold				

General election 1859: Buteshire
Party	Candidate	Votes	%	±%
Conservative	David Mure	138	51.7	N/A
Liberal	James Lamont	129	48.3	N/A
Majority		9	3.4	N/A
Turnout		267	55.7	N/A
Registered electors		479		
Conservative gain from Peelite		Swing	N/A	

=== Elections in the 1860s ===
Mure's appointment as a Senator of the College of Justice, becoming Lord Mure, caused a by-election.

By-election, 16 Feb 1865: Buteshire
Party	Candidate	Votes	%	±%
Conservative	George Boyle	205	51.9	+0.2
Liberal	James Lamont	190	48.1	−0.2
Majority		15	3.8	+0.4
Turnout		395	77.0	+21.3
Registered electors		513		
Conservative hold		Swing		

General election 1865: Buteshire
Party	Candidate	Votes	%	±%
Liberal	James Lamont	203	51.4	+3.1
Conservative	George Boyle	192	48.6	−3.1
Majority		11	2.8	N/A
Turnout		395	77.0	+21.3
Registered electors		513		
Liberal gain from Conservative		Swing		

General election 1868: Buteshire
Party	Candidate	Votes	%	±%
Conservative	Charles Dalrymple	527	59.3	+10.7
Liberal	John William Burns	362	40.7	−10.7
Majority		165	18.6	N/A
Turnout		889	82.9	+5.9
Registered electors		1,073		
Conservative gain from Liberal		Swing	+10.7	

=== Elections in the 1870s ===
General election 1874: Buteshire
Party	Candidate	Votes	%	±%
Conservative	Charles Dalrymple	Unopposed		
Registered electors		1,113		
Conservative hold				

=== Elections in the 1880s ===
General election 1880: Buteshire
Party	Candidate	Votes	%	±%
Liberal	Thomas Russell	568	50.8	New
Conservative	Charles Dalrymple	551	49.2	N/A
Majority		17	1.6	N/A
Turnout		1,119	85.4	N/A
Registered electors		1,311		
Liberal gain from Conservative		Swing	N/A	

Russell was disqualified due to his holding of a government contract at the time of the election, causing a by-election.

By-election, 6 Jul 1880: Buteshire
Party	Candidate	Votes	%	±%
Conservative	Charles Dalrymple	585	52.0	+2.8
Liberal	Thomas Russell	540	48.0	−2.8
Majority		45	4.0	N/A
Turnout		1,125	85.8	+0.4
Registered electors		1,311		
Conservative gain from Liberal		Swing	N/A	

Dalrymple was appointed a Lord Commissioner of the Treasury, requiring a by-election.

By-election, 3 Jul 1885: Buteshire
Party	Candidate	Votes	%	±%
Conservative	Charles Dalrymple	Unopposed		
Conservative gain from Liberal				

General election 1885: Buteshire
Party	Candidate	Votes	%	±%
Conservative	James Robertson	1,374	55.8	+6.6
Liberal	Robert Allan Maclean	1,090	44.2	−6.6
Majority		284	11.6	N/A
Turnout		2,464	83.7	−1.7
Registered electors		2,943		
Conservative gain from Liberal		Swing	+6.6	

General election 1886: Buteshire
Party	Candidate	Votes	%	±%
Conservative	James Robertson	1,364	62.5	+6.7
Liberal	Nigel MacNeill	819	37.5	−6.7
Majority		545	25.0	+13.4
Turnout		2,183	74.2	−9.5
Registered electors		2,943		
Conservative hold		Swing	+6.7	

Robertson was appointed as Solicitor General for Scotland, requiring a by-election.

By-election, 12 Aug 1886: Buteshire
Party	Candidate	Votes	%	±%
Conservative	James Robertson	Unopposed		
Conservative hold				

=== Elections in the 1890s ===
1891 Buteshire by-election
Party	Candidate	Votes	%	±%
Conservative	Andrew Murray	1,335	57.4	−5.1
Liberal	John McCulloch	990	42.6	+5.1
Majority		345	14.8	−10.2
Turnout		2,325	73.6	−0.6
Registered electors		3,159		
Conservative hold				

General election 1892: Buteshire
Party	Candidate	Votes	%	±%
Conservative	Andrew Murray	1,466	59.1	−3.4
Liberal	Robert Earle M Smith	1,013	40.9	+3.4
Majority		453	18.2	−6.8
Turnout		2,479	77.6	+3.4
Registered electors		3,195		
Conservative hold		Swing	+1.7	

General election 1895: Buteshire
Party	Candidate	Votes	%	±%
Conservative	Andrew Murray	Unopposed		
Conservative hold				

=== Elections in the 1900s ===
General election 1900: Buteshire
Party	Candidate	Votes	%	±%
Conservative	Andrew Murray	1,241	54.3	N/A
Liberal	Norman Lamont	1,046	45.7	New
Majority		195	8.6	N/A
Turnout		2,287	67.0	N/A
Registered electors		3,412		
Conservative hold		Swing	N/A	

1905 Buteshire by-election
Party	Candidate	Votes	%	±%
Liberal	Norman Lamont	1,460	50.6	+4.9
Liberal Unionist	Edward Theodore Salvesen	1,426	49.4	−4.9
Majority		34	1.2	N/A
Turnout		2,886	80.7	+13.7
Registered electors		3,578		
Liberal gain from Conservative		Swing	+4.9	

Lamont

General election 1906: Buteshire
Party	Candidate	Votes	%	±%
Liberal	Norman Lamont	1,637	51.9	+6.2
Conservative	Guy Thomas Speir	1,517	48.1	−6.2
Majority		120	3.8	N/A
Turnout		3,154	82.7	+15.7
Registered electors		3,816		
Liberal gain from Conservative		Swing	+6.2	

=== Elections in the 1910s ===
General election January 1910: Buteshire
Party	Candidate	Votes	%	±%
Conservative	Harry Hope	1,531	52.7	+4.6
Liberal	Norman Lamont	1,372	47.3	−4.6
Majority		159	5.4	N/A
Turnout		2,903	81.5	−1.2
Conservative gain from Liberal		Swing		

Mitchell

General election December 1910: Buteshire
Party	Candidate	Votes	%	±%
Conservative	Harry Hope	1,569	54.4	+1.7
Liberal	Edward Mitchell	1,316	45.6	−1.7
Majority		253	8.8	+3.4
Turnout		2,885	81.9	+0.4
Conservative hold		Swing	+1.7	

== Sources ==
- Leigh Rayment's Historical List of MPs – Constituencies beginning with "B" (part 6)
