= John Balfour, 1st Baron Kinross =

British politician (1837–1905)

The Right Honourable The Lord Kinross PC DL
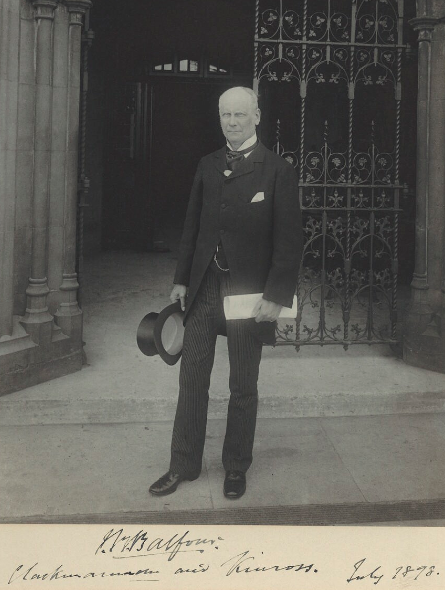

Lord Justice General
- In office 1899–1905
- Monarchs: Victoria; Edward VII
- Preceded by: James Robertson
- Succeeded by: Andrew Graham Murray

Member of Parliament for Clackmannan and Kinross
- In office 29 April 1880 – December 1899
- Preceded by: Sir William Adam
- Succeeded by: Eugene Wason

Personal details
- Born: John Blair Balfour; 11 July 1837 Clackmannan, Scotland
- Died: 22 January 1905 (aged 67) Edinburgh, Scotland
- Spouses: Lilias Oswald Mackenzie (m. 1869, died) Hon. Marianne Eliza Moncrieff (after 1877)
- Children: 6
- Parent(s): Peter Balfour; Jane Ramsay Blair
- Education: Edinburgh Academy
- Alma mater: Edinburgh University

John Blair Balfour, 1st Baron Kinross PC DL (born 11 July 1837 – 22 January 1905) was a Scottish lawyer and Liberal politician who sat in the House of Commons from 1880 to 1899.

== Early life ==
Balfour was born in the manse at Clackmannan, the son of Rev. Peter Balfour ("Perpendicular Peter"), minister of Clackmannan and his wife Jane Ramsay Blair, daughter of John Blair.

He was educated at the Edinburgh Academy and then studied law at Edinburgh University, becoming an advocate of the Scottish bar in 1861.

== Career ==
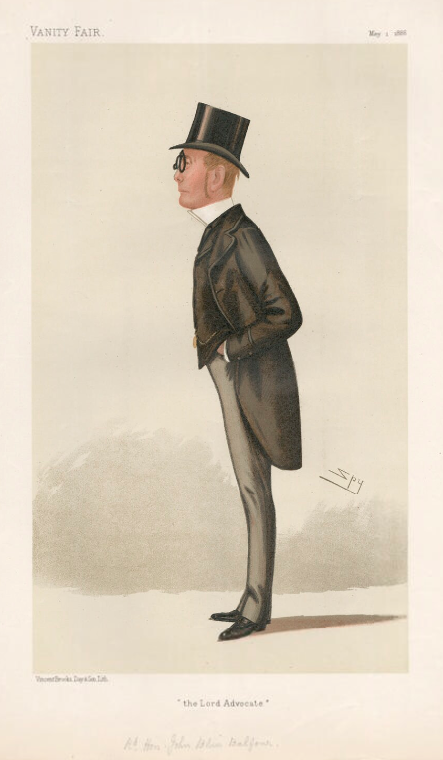
"the Lord Advocate" Balfour as caricatured by Spy (Leslie Ward) in Vanity Fair, May 1886

He served as Advocate Depute from 1870 to 1872, and in 1880 was made a Queen's Counsel. He was a Deputy Lieutenant for Edinburgh.

At the 1880 general election, Balfour stood unsuccessfully for parliament at Ayrshire North but in a by election six months later was elected Liberal Member of Parliament for Clackmannan and Kinross.

He was appointed Solicitor General for Scotland in 1880 and in 1881 he succeeded this appointment by becoming Lord Advocate, a post he held for four years. In 1882 he became a Privy Counsellor. He served as the elected Dean of the Faculty of Advocates twice: from 1885 to 1886, and from 1889 to 1892.

In 1892, on the return of the Liberals to power, Balfour was again appointed Lord Advocate, finally resigning on the fall of Lord Rosebery's government in 1895. In 1899 he was appointed Lord Justice General of Scotland and Lord President of the Court of Session.

In the 1902 Coronation Honours list it was announced that he would receive a barony, and on 15 July 1902 he was created Baron Kinross, of Glascune in the County of Haddingtonshire. He took the oath and his seat in the House of Lords the following month, on 7 August.

== Personal life ==
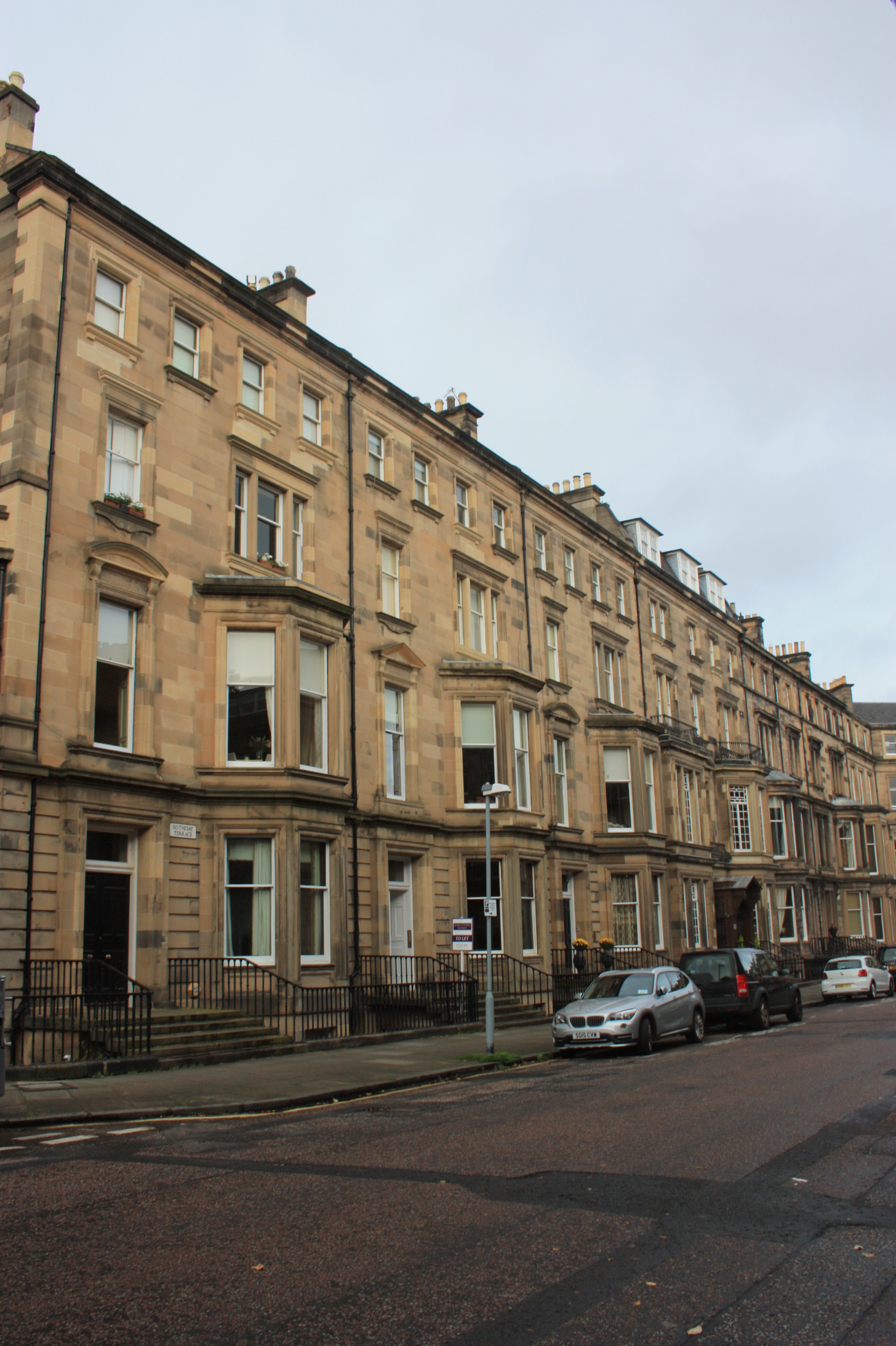
6 Rothesay Terrace, Edinburgh (left)

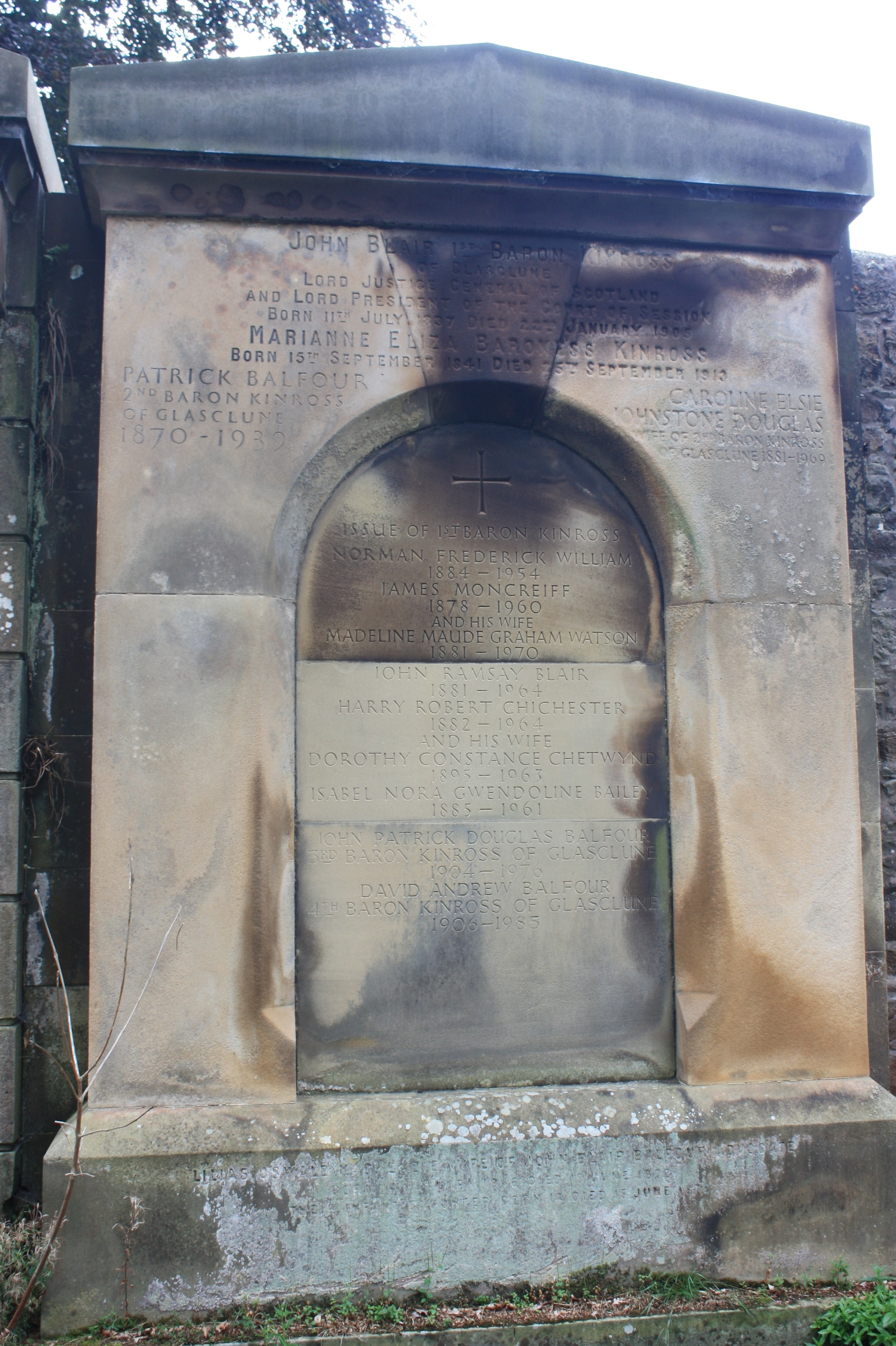
Baron Kinross monument, Dean Cemetery

On 4 August 1869 Balfour married Lilias Oswald Mackenzie daughter of Donald Mackenzie, styled Lord Mackenzie, a Lord of Session, and Janet Alice Mitchell. They had one son who lived with the family and was trained as an advocate:

- Patrick Balfour, 2nd Baron Kinross (1870–1939), who married Caroline Elsie Johnstone-Douglas, a daughter of Arthur Johnstone-Douglas.

After the death of his first wife, he married secondly the Hon. Marianne Eliza Moncrieff in 1877. Marianne was a daughter of James Moncreiff, 1st Baron Moncreiff. Together, they were the parents of five children, four sons and one daughter, including:

- Hon. James Moncreiffe Balfour (1878–1960), who married Madeline Maude Graham Watson, daughter of James Graham Watson (brother-in-law of Sir Robert Tuite Boothby), in 1908.
- Hon. John Ramsay Blair Balfour (1881–1964), a lieutenant-commander in the Royal Navy who died unmarried.
- Hon. Harry Robert Chichester Balfour (1882–1964), who married Dorothy Constance Chetwynd, a daughter of Henry Goulburn Willoughby Chetwynd and Eva Constance Elizabeth Fanny Berney, in 1921.
- Hon. Norman Frederick William Balfour (1884–1954), the Vicar of Leafield who died unmarried.
- Hon. Isobel Nora Gwendoline Balfour (1885–1961), who married Capt. Percival Henry Havelock Bailey, in 1908.

Lord Kinross died 22 January 1905, at his home at 6 Rothesay Terrace in Edinburgh, and was buried in the "Lords Row" in Dean Cemetery, Edinburgh. His descendants are buried with him.

== Notes ==
Parliament of the United Kingdom
Preceded by Sir William Patrick Adam	Member of Parliament for Clackmannan and Kinross; 1880–1899	Succeeded by Eugene Wason
Legal offices
Preceded by John Macdonald	Solicitor General for Scotland; 1880–1881	Succeeded by Alexander Asher
Preceded by John McLaren	Lord Advocate; 1881–1885	Succeeded by John Macdonald
Preceded by John Macdonald	Lord Advocate; 1886	Succeeded by John Macdonald
Preceded by Sir Charles John Pearson	Lord Advocate; 1892–1895	Succeeded by Sir Charles John Pearson
Preceded by James Robertson	Lord Justice General; 1899–1905	Succeeded by Andrew Graham Murray
Peerage of the United Kingdom
New creation	Baron Kinross; 1902–1905	Succeeded by Patrick Balfour
