= Sir Norman Lamont, 2nd Baronet =

Scottish Liberal Party politician (1869–1949)

Norman Lamont

Sir Norman Lamont, 2nd Baronet (7 September 1869 – 3 September 1949) was a Scottish Liberal Party politician, sugar planter in Trinidad, and a recognised authority on agriculture.

== Family and education ==
Norman Lamont was the son of Sir James Lamont Bt and Adelaide, daughter of Sir George Denys Bt. Sir James Lamont was variously a professional soldier, serving as an ensign in the 91st Argyllshire Highlanders, an Arctic yachtsman, making and recording details of voyages to Spitsbergen and Novaya Zemlya and a Member of Parliament. He represented Buteshire as a Liberal from 1865–68. Norman Lamont had a brother, Alexander Lamont, a lieutenant in the Gordon Highlanders who was killed at Dargai in 1907 and a sister.

Lamont was educated at Winchester and the Downton Agricultural College, near Salisbury where he received his certificate in 1890. He took a strong interest in agricultural affairs throughout his whole life and was published in the Journal of the Royal Agricultural Society. The Lamont family was wealthy. Sir James had been left a fortune by an uncle who died in 1849. The family owned a substantial estate at Knockdow, on the Cowal peninsula in Argyll. This wealth enabled Sir James to indulge his sporting, exploration and political interests and also provided for his son Norman to follow the family political tradition.

Norman succeeded to the baronetcy on his father's death in 1913. He never married and he left no heir.

Lamont took an interest in the history of Scotland and specifically of the Clan Lamont, serving as its President in 1938. The report of the first general meeting of the Clan Lamont published in 1897 contains a lecture by Norman Lamont on Sketches of the history of Clan Lamont from the earliest times till 1663; ten pamphlets by Sir Norman Lamont (and from his library) put together to make an integral volume. Lamont also addressed later meetings of Clan Lamont in Glasgow and a history of the Clan was published after his death using his writings and addresses.

== Politics ==
=== Buteshire ===
Lamont first stood for Parliament at the general election of 1900, contesting his father's old seat of Buteshire. The seat had been Unionist since his father had stood down at the 1868 election. Nevertheless, Lamont lost only narrowly by a majority of 195 votes out of a total of 2,248 cast.

=== 1905 by-election ===
He continued to take an interest in the constituency and in 1905 he got another chance to fight the seat when the sitting MP, Andrew Graham Murray, who was Secretary of State for Scotland resigned on being appointed Lord Justice General and Lord President of the Court of Session. At the resulting by-election, Lamont gained the seat for the Liberals by a majority of 34 votes. He then held the seat at the 1906 general election slightly increasing his majority to 120.

=== Political offices ===
From 1906–1908 Lamont served as unpaid Parliamentary Private Secretary (PPS) to the Prime Minister, Sir Henry Campbell-Bannerman. In 1909, he acted as PPS to Winston Churchill while he was President of the Board of Trade. He also held the position of Honorary Secretary of the Scottish Liberal Association, 1904–08. He served as a member of a Departmental Committee on agricultural education on which he was able to use his background and expertise on the subject. In 1909 he was Chairman of a committee on labour exchanges.

=== 1910 and after ===
At the January 1910 general election Lamont lost his seat at Buteshire to the Conservatives. In another tightly fought contest the Conservative, Harry Hope, gained the seat by a majority of 159 votes. Lamont decided not to stand in the next general election which was expected to follow quickly and which eventually came in December 1910. He went out to Trinidad where he owned a sugar plantation, a property which had been in the Lamont family for some time. Taking over the Trinidad plantations in 1907, he abandoned the uneconomic cultivation of sugar, and branched out into other crops, which enabled him to retain the family property while others were changing hands at a loss. He also served on the Islands Board of Agriculture and was appointed to serve as a member of the Legislative Council of Trinidad and Tobago from 1915–1923. From 1921–1945 he was a Governor of the Imperial College of Tropical Agriculture (ICTA) in Trinidad, the recognised centre for postgraduate training in tropical agriculture for the agricultural services of the British Empire. Many of its students were appointed to the Colonial Agricultural Service and allied services, holding posts across the world. ICTA later became a founding institution of the University of the West Indies. One source has maintained that Lamont was an intellectual founder of the College, suggesting such an institution be established as early as 1902 and developing this theme in later writings. He lectured on and wrote a number of books concerning the Caribbean islands. (See publications section below).

Lamont also had financial interests in the East Indies. He was Chairman of the Third Mile and Glen Rubber companies in Malaya which owned 8,000 acres (32 km^{2}).

== Other appointments ==
Lamont was appointed to be a Deputy Lieutenant of the County of Argyll in 1901. He was a Justice of the Peace for Argyll and an elder of the Kirk, serving both in the Presbytery and the General Assembly. He was also a Fellow of the Society of Antiquaries of Scotland.

== Death ==
Lamont died at his home, Palmiste, San Fernando on the island of Trinidad on 3 September 1949 at the age of 79. He had been gored by one of the bulls on his estate.

== Publications ==
- British grasses; Oban 1902
- Snapshots at Scottish History: Bute and Cowal in the olden time; The Buteman, Rothesay, 1909
- Problems of the Antilles; John Smith, Glasgow 1912
- An Inventory of Lamont Papers; Skinner & Co, Edinburgh, 1914
- Random notes from old writers on the West Highlands; Thomas Gilchrist, Dunoon, 1926
- A Catalogue of Trinidad Moths, 1927
- Problems of Trinidad, being a collection of speeches and writings on subjects connected with the colony; Yuille's printerie, Port of Spain, 1933
- Gleanings: A Miscellany; Khan's, San Fernando, 1946
- History of the Clan Lamont; E & R Englis, 1955

Parliament of the United Kingdom
Preceded by Andrew Graham Murray	Member of Parliament for Buteshire; 1905 – 1910	Succeeded by Harry Hope
Baronetage of the United Kingdom
Preceded by James Lamont	Baronet (of Knockdaw); 1913–1949	Extinct
