= Webber Douglas Academy of Dramatic Art =

Drama school in London, England

Coordinates: 51°29′35″N 0°10′51″W

- Type: Drama school
- Active: 1926–2006
- Founder: Walter Johnstone Douglas
- Location: 30 Clareville Street, South Kensington, England

The Webber Douglas Academy of Dramatic Art, formerly the Webber Douglas School of Singing and Dramatic Art, was a drama school, and originally a singing school, in London. It was one of the leading drama schools in Britain, and offered comprehensive training for those intending to pursue a professional performance career.

== History ==
The school was founded in London in 1926 as the Webber Douglas School of Singing, by Walter Johnstone Douglas (youngest son of Arthur Johnstone-Douglas) and Amherst Webber. It was created from the singing academy founded in 1906 in Paris by Jean de Reszke. By 1932, the school had added full theatrical training to its curriculum, and was renamed the Webber Douglas School of Singing and Dramatic Art. It was located at 30 Clareville Street in South Kensington.

In 2006, the academy was absorbed into the Central School of Speech and Drama. In 2009, the Central School of Speech and Drama renamed its Embassy Studio the Webber Douglas Studio.

== Alumni ==
See Category:Alumni of the Webber Douglas Academy of Dramatic Art
