= Sholto Johnstone Douglas =

Scottish artist (1871–1958)

Robert Sholto Johnstone Douglas (3 December 1871 – 10 March 1958), known as Sholto Douglas, or more formally as Sholto Johnstone Douglas, was a Scottish figurative artist, a painter chiefly of portraits and landscapes.

In 1895, he stood surety for the bail of Oscar Wilde.

== Early life ==
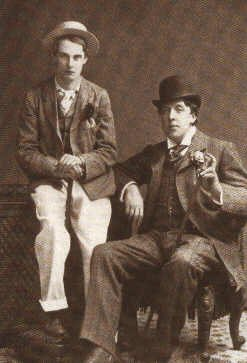
Douglas's cousin Lord Alfred Douglas and Oscar Wilde. Douglas stood surety for Wilde's bail.

Douglas was born in Edinburgh, a member of the aristocratic Queensberry family, part of the Clan Douglas. He was the son of Arthur Johnstone-Douglas DL JP of Lockerbie (1846–1923) and his wife Jane Maitland Stewart, and the grandson of Robert Johnstone Douglas of Lockerbie, himself the son of Henry Alexander Douglas, a brother of the sixth and seventh Marquesses of Queensberry. His paternal grandmother, Lady Jane Douglas (1811–1881), was herself a daughter of Charles Douglas, 6th Marquess of Queensberry, so she was her husband's first cousin. Douglas's third cousin and contemporary John Douglas, 9th Marquess of Queensberry (1844–1900) was famous for the rules of the sport of boxing. Another cousin was Lady Florence Dixie, the war correspondent and big game hunter.

Douglas studied art in London, at the Slade School of Fine Art and also in Paris and Antwerp.

Douglas's cousin Lord Alfred Douglas, or 'Bosie', was a close friend of the writer Oscar Wilde. When Wilde sued Bosie's father for libel when accused of "posing as a somdomite" (sic), this led to Wilde's downfall and imprisonment. In 1895, when during his trial Wilde was released on bail, Sholto Johnstone Douglas stood surety for £500 of the bail money.

In his Noel Coward: A Biography (1996), Philip Hoare writes of "...late nineteenth-century enthusiasts of boy-love; writers, artists and Catholic converts inclined to intellectual paedophilia, among them Wilde, Frederick Rolfe, Sholto Douglas and Lord Alfred Douglas."

== Life and work ==
As a portrait painter, Douglas belonged to the period of John Singer Sargent and "...led a long life notable for its unassuming expression of civilized values".

He was at home in Scotland as a painter and as a sportsman, shooting, riding and sailing. He kept ponies brought back from a visit to Iceland. He came to attention at the Royal Academy by being the first artist to hang a painting there of a motor car, but was best known for his portraits and his Scottish landscapes, which "...portrayed, with a truly poetic sense of atmosphere, the subtle half-tones of his native countryside".

In 1897, Douglas visited Australia and New Zealand. His uncle John Douglas, a former Premier of Queensland and Governor of New Guinea, arranged for the author R. W. Semon to take Douglas with him on a visit to New Guinea. Semon wrote "This young Scotsman was just then staying with his uncle on Thursday Island, being on his way back to Europe after a voyage to Australia and New Zealand."

In 1900, Douglas painted the author John Buchan. His portrait of his friend George Howson, headmaster of Gresham's School, hangs at the school.

In 1904, London's Temple Bar magazine reported

We cannot leave the exhibition without noting the astonishingly successful treatment of light in the speaking portrait of Madame Besnard, full of fine drawing, ease, and originality, which M. Besnard has given us, nor the poetically suggestive beauty of The Sisters by Sholto Douglas, in which a reminiscence of one of Whistler's lovely Nocturnes is aroused."

In June 1907, Douglas held an exhibition of his portraits at the Alpine Club in London. The International Studio noted that

"Mr. Sholto Johnstone Douglas exhibited a collection of his portraits. The artist is apparently a prey to indecision in the matter of style, many influences, from Romsey [sic] to Wilson Steer, being apparent. Marquise?, Mrs. Russell Bryde, Study for a Portrait Group, and The Lady Kinross, however, were portraits of some distinction.

In Scottish Painting, Past and Present, 1620-1908 (1908), James Lewis Caw wrote of Douglas's portrait work:

Mr Sholto Johnstone Douglas unites Whistlerian tone and chicness of brushwork with a good deal of old-fashioned likeness-making. His work, however, is somewhat lacking in that straightforward, if often undistinguished, grasp of character which gives much old-fashioned art an interest of its own, and frequently it fails to reach the conventional distinction possessed by much modern portraiture. Still, this combination of qualities makes his portraiture acceptable to those who care for neither of these elements alone, and, a scion of a Dumfriesshire county family, he has painted many people of social standing.

However, Caw says elsewhere in the same book

"The portraits of Harrington Mann and Fiddes Watt, of Sholto Douglas and E. A. Borthwick, and of a few others, are more on lines which have become a convention with the younger school."

In 1909, The International Studio said of a painting

"Mr. Sholto Douglas experimented perhaps beyond his powers, but in A Day in June he secured a lively and expressive rendering of the faces; just the qualities which Mr. David Neave missed, for his success with accessories seems to beguile his brush away from the sitters.

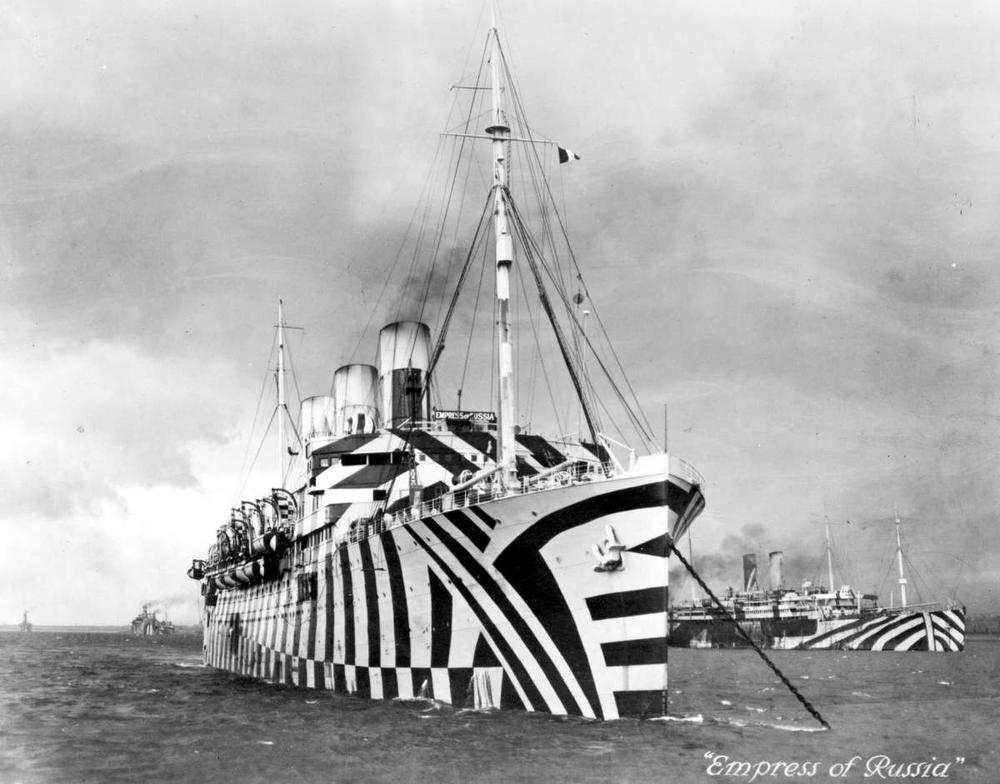
Photograph of SS Empress of Russia in dazzle camouflage, 1918

On 9 November 1912, under the headline 'Sholto J. Douglas Coming Here', The New York Times reported Douglas's sailing from London for the United States, having "a number of commissions to paint portraits in New York".

His work also includes many paintings of "dazzle ships" during the First World War, and the Imperial War Museum has fifty-two of these paintings.

In December 1921, the novelist Arnold Bennett noted in his journal that on Boxing Day he had lunched with Douglas and his wife at the Hotel Bristol in Cannes to meet the Polish singer Jean de Reszke.

From 1926 to 1939, Douglas lived in France and painted many landscapes in Provence.

Elsie Bonita Adams has compared Douglas to the character of Eugene Marchbanks in George Bernard Shaw's play Candida (1898):

Though Marchbanks has many of the external characteristics and some of the attitudes of the aesthete-artist such as Sholto Douglas or Adrian Herbert, he does not pay mere lip-service to art, his sensitivity is no pose, and he tries to rid himself of illusions.

In March 2005, a portrait by Douglas of the Scottish laird Ian Brodie, 24th Brodie of Brodie, was accepted by the British government from Brodie's heir in lieu of tax.

== Marriage and descendants ==
On 19 April 1913, Douglas married Bettina, the daughter of Harman Grisewood, of Daylesford, Gloucestershire. They had one son and one daughter:

- Robert Arthur Sholto Johnstone-Douglas (1914-1985)
- Elizabeth Gwendolen Teresa Johnstone-Douglas (1916–2011), who married William Craven, 6th Earl of Craven, in 1954.

=== Descendants ===
Through his daughter, he was a grandfather of Thomas Craven, 7th Earl of Craven (1957–1983), Simon Craven, 8th Earl of Craven (1961–1990), and Lady Ann Mary Elizabeth Craven (born 1959), the wife of Dr. Lionel Tarassenko.

== See also ==
- List of British artists
