= Inverchaolain =

Coordinates: 55.932709°N 5.0591932°W

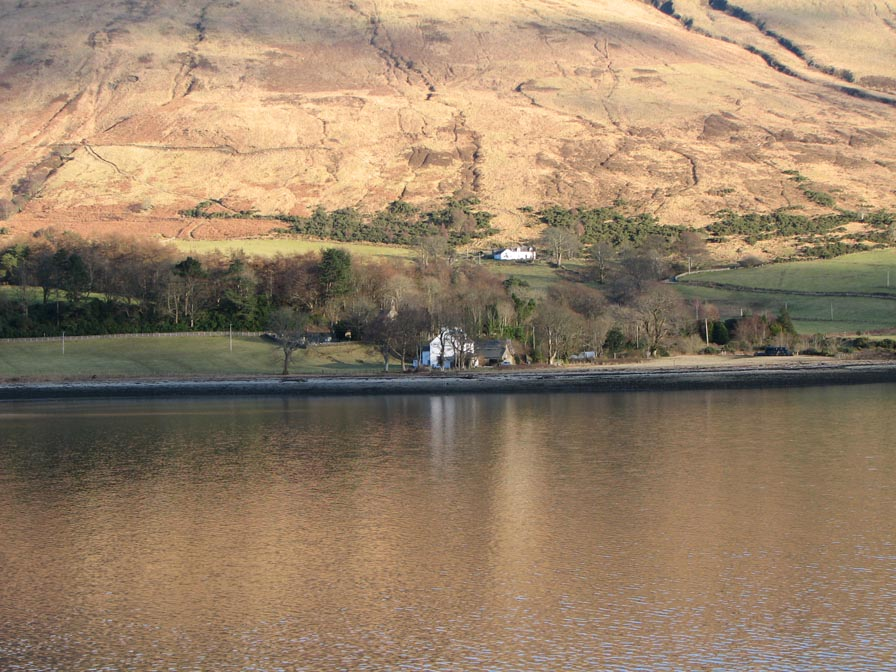
- Inverchaolain, Loch Striven

- Location within Argyll and Bute
- OS grid reference: NS 09000 75300
- Council area: Argyll and Bute
- Lieutenancy area: Argyll and Bute
- Country: Scotland
- Sovereign state: United Kingdom
- Post town: DUNOON, ARGYLL
- Postcode district: PA23
- Dialling code: 01369
- UK Parliament: Argyll, Bute and South Lochaber
- Scottish Parliament: Argyll and Bute

Inverchaolain is a hamlet in Cowal, in Argyll and Bute, west of Scotland. It lies on the east shore of Loch Striven, to the south of Glenstriven and to the north of Knockdow.

There is a church (Inverchaolain Church, the fourth iteration at the site), manse and graveyard. The present church was built in 1912, but it closed in 1990.
