= Donald Mackenzie, Lord Mackenzie =

Scottish law lord

The Hon. Donald Mackenzie, Lord Mackenzie FRSE (22 June 1818 – 19 May 1875) was a Scottish lawyer who served as a Senator of the College of Justice in Edinburgh.

== Early life ==
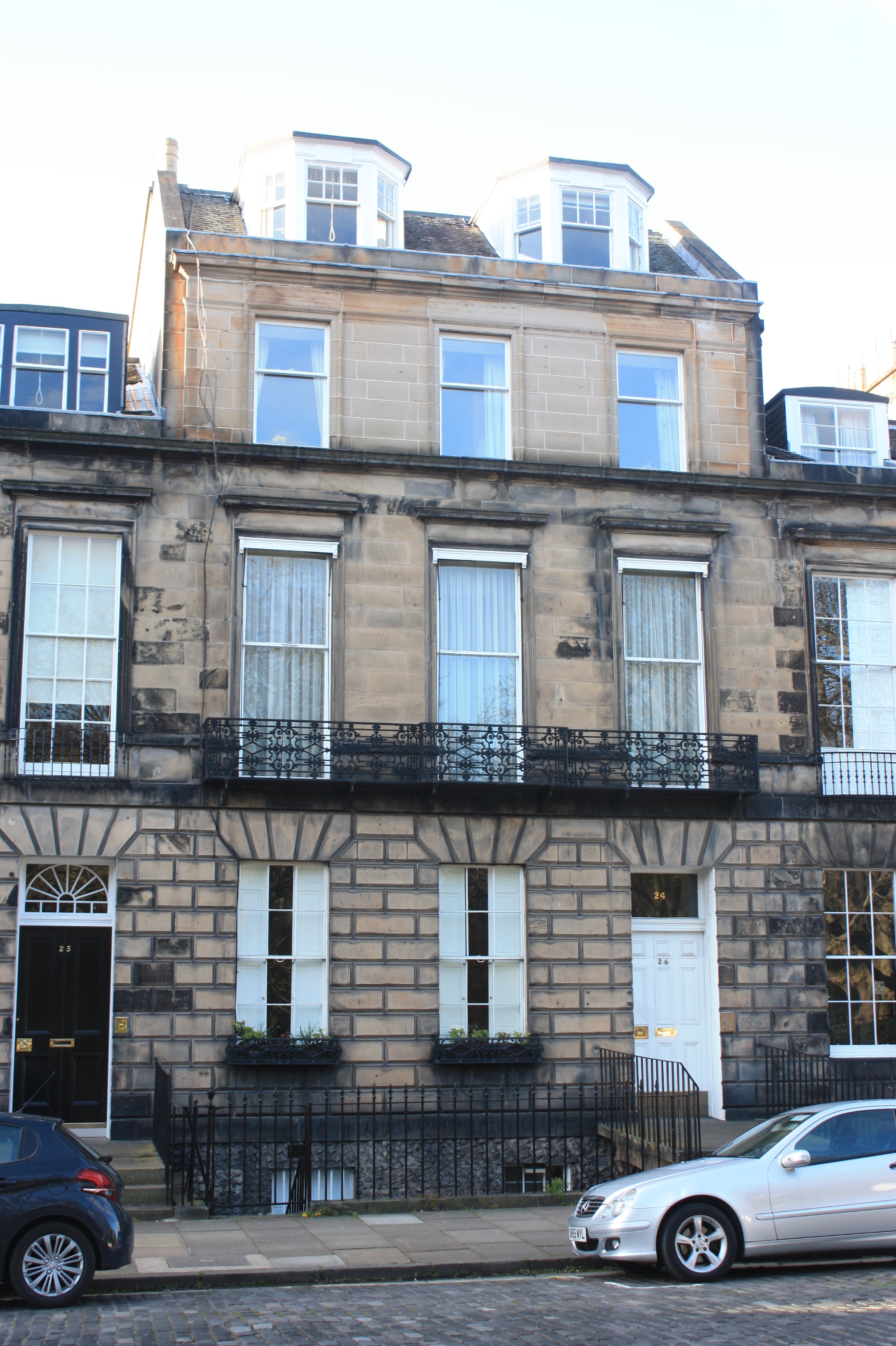
24 Heriot Row, Edinburgh

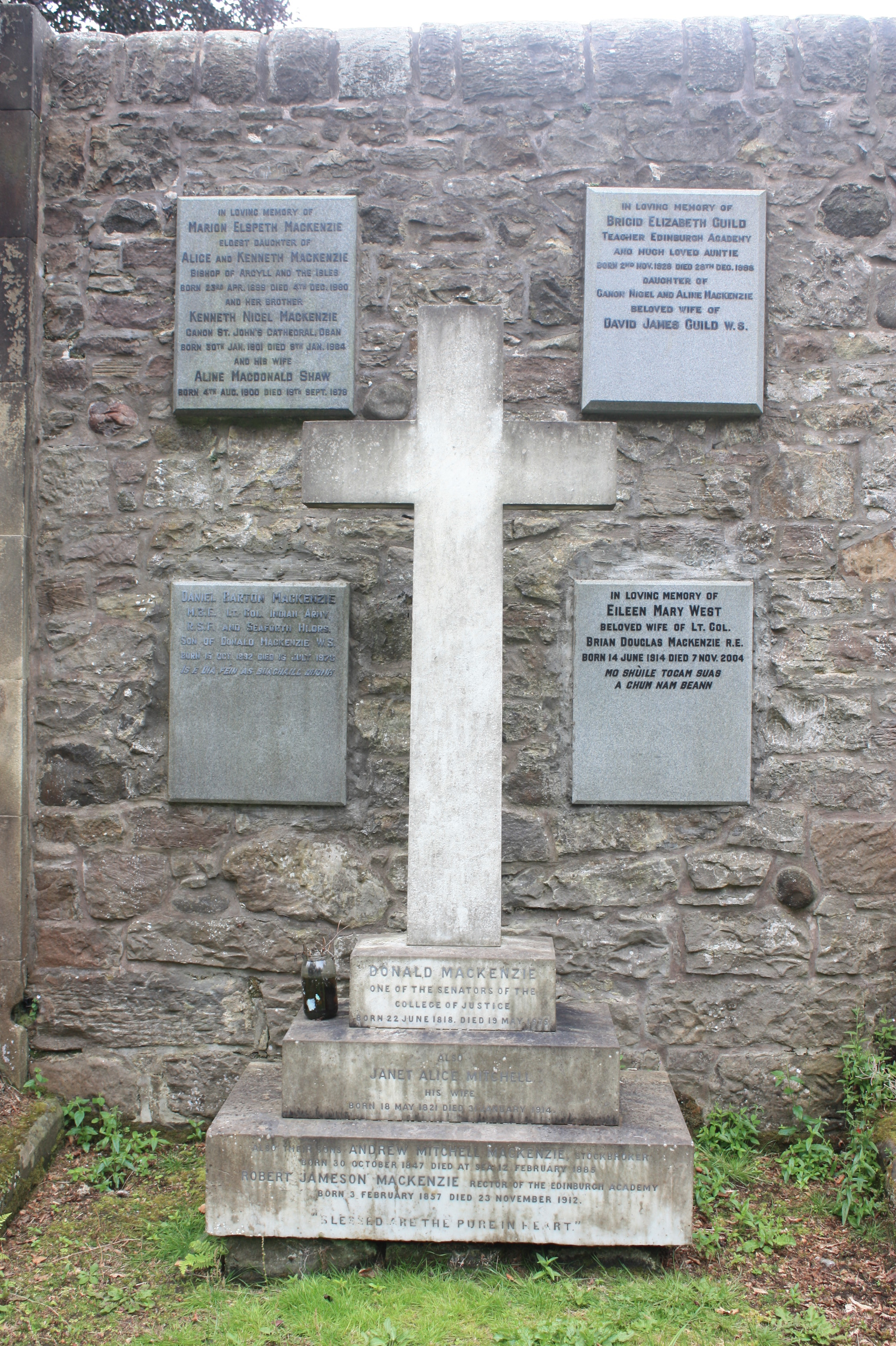
The grave of Donald Mackenzie, Lord Mackenzie, Dean Cemetery

Donald Mackenzie was born 22 June 1818, the only son of Margaret Robina Jamieson, daughter of the Rev. John Jamieson, DD, author of the Etymological Dictionary of the Scottish Language, and Capt. Donald Mackenzie, of the 21st Fusiliers. In early life the family lived at 39 George Square in south Edinburgh.

He studied at the Loretto School and the University of Edinburgh. He originally studied medicine, graduating with an MD at the University of Edinburgh in 1838, and became a licentiate of the Royal College of Physicians and also a Fellow of the Royal College of Surgeons. Mackenzie never practised as a physician, instead, yielding to his mother's wishes, he took up the study of the law.

== Legal career and later life ==
Mackenzie was admitted as an advocate to the Scottish bar in 1842. He was Advocate Depute from 1854 to 1858, and again from 1859 to 1861. He served as the Sheriff of Fifeshire from 1861 to 1870. On 16 March 1870, he was appointed a Judge of the Court of Session in Scotland, under the name Lord Mackenzie.

Mackenzie's Edinburgh Georgian townhouse was at 24 Heriot Row, in the New Town.

In 1870 he was elected a Fellow of the Royal Society of Edinburgh his proposer being his legal colleague, Charles Neaves, Lord Neaves.

Mackenzie died at Maulside, Dulwich Wood Park, Norwood, outside London, England, on 19 May 1875. Due to ill health he had taken a leave of absence from his duties at the College of Justice a short time before his death. He is buried in Dean Cemetery in Edinburgh, Scotland. The grave lies on the western wall in the section known as "Lord's Row".

== Family ==
On 6 September 1843, Mackenzie married Janet Alice Mitchell (1821-1914), the daughter of Andrew Mitchell, Esq. of Maulside, Ayrshire. The couple had 12 children.

- Donald Mackenzie (1844-1924), married Laura Augusta Mackenzie Douglas, the granddaughter of Sir Archibald Campbell, 1st Baronet
- Lilias Oswald Mackenzie, married John Balfour, 1st Baron Kinross, in 1869 Died in 1872
- Andrew Mitchell Mackenzie (1847-1885), Stockbroker, married Helen Maria Mackenzie Douglas, a second granddaughter of Sir Archibald Campbell
- Charlotte Margaret Robina Mackenzie (1850-1903)
- Alice Elizabeth Mackenzie (born 1852), married Charles Walker
- Annie Adele Mackenzie (1854-1925), married the Hon. Alexander Low, Lord Low, a Senator of the College of Justice, Edinburgh, Scotland
- Robert Jameson Mackenzie (1857-1912), Rector of Edinburgh Academy 1888 -1901 and author of the book, "Almond of Loretto"
- Alastair Oswald Morison Mackenzie, K.C. (1858-1949), Sheriff of Inverness, Elgin and Nairn, then later Renfrewshire, and later still Sheriff of Lanarkshire
- Farquhar John Conrad Mackenzie (1861-1916), Farmer in USA
- The Right Reverend Dr. Kenneth Mackenzie (1863-1945), Bishop of Argyll and The Isles
- Mary Oswald Mackenzie (1866-1954), married Charles Frewen Jenkin, an engineer and later professor of sngineering science at the University of Oxford
