= Toward =

Coordinates: 55.864450°N 4.9834837°W

Toward: Scottish Gaelic: Tollard
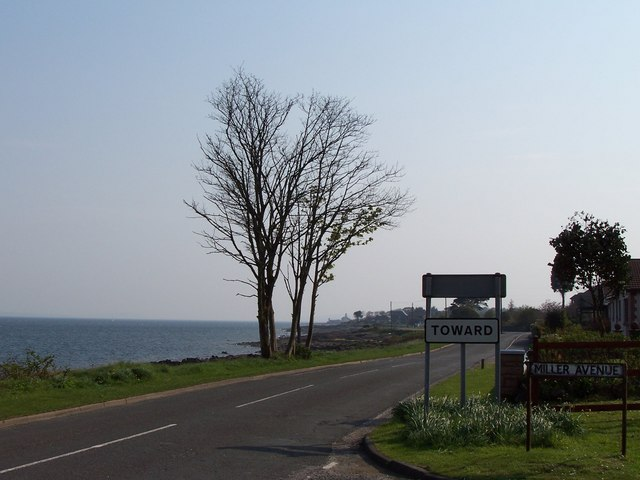
- Toward sign

- Location within Argyll and Bute
- OS grid reference: NS 13400 67500
- Council area: Argyll and Bute
- Lieutenancy area: Argyll and Bute
- Country: Scotland
- Sovereign state: United Kingdom
- Post town: DUNOON, ARGYLL
- Postcode district: PA23
- Dialling code: 01369
- UK Parliament: Argyll, Bute and South Lochaber
- Scottish Parliament: Argyll and Bute

Toward (Scottish Gaelic: Tollard) is a village near Dunoon, west of Scotland, in the south of the Cowal Peninsula.

During World War II, the Toward area was a training centre called HMS Brontosaurus also known as the No 2 Combined Training Centre (CTC), based at Castle Toward.

== Castle Toward ==
Nearby is Castle Toward, a former country house built close to the ruined Toward Castle. Castle Toward was used as an outdoor education centre. The grounds were also used as a location for the children's BBC TV series Raven. Sold by Argyll and Bute Council to a private individual in 2016.

== Toward Point Lighthouse ==
Toward Point has one of the eighteen lighthouses built by Robert Stevenson.

== Highland Boundary Fault ==
The Highland Boundary Fault passes Toward, as it crosses Scotland from Isle of Arran in the west to Stonehaven on the east coast. The geological fault line formed around 430 million years ago.

== Sports ==
Toward Seasports Club provides racing, cruising and training.

== Gallery ==
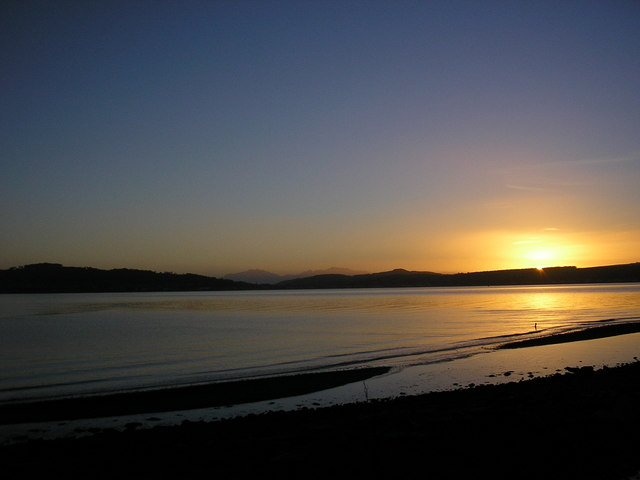
Bute and Arran hills from Toward

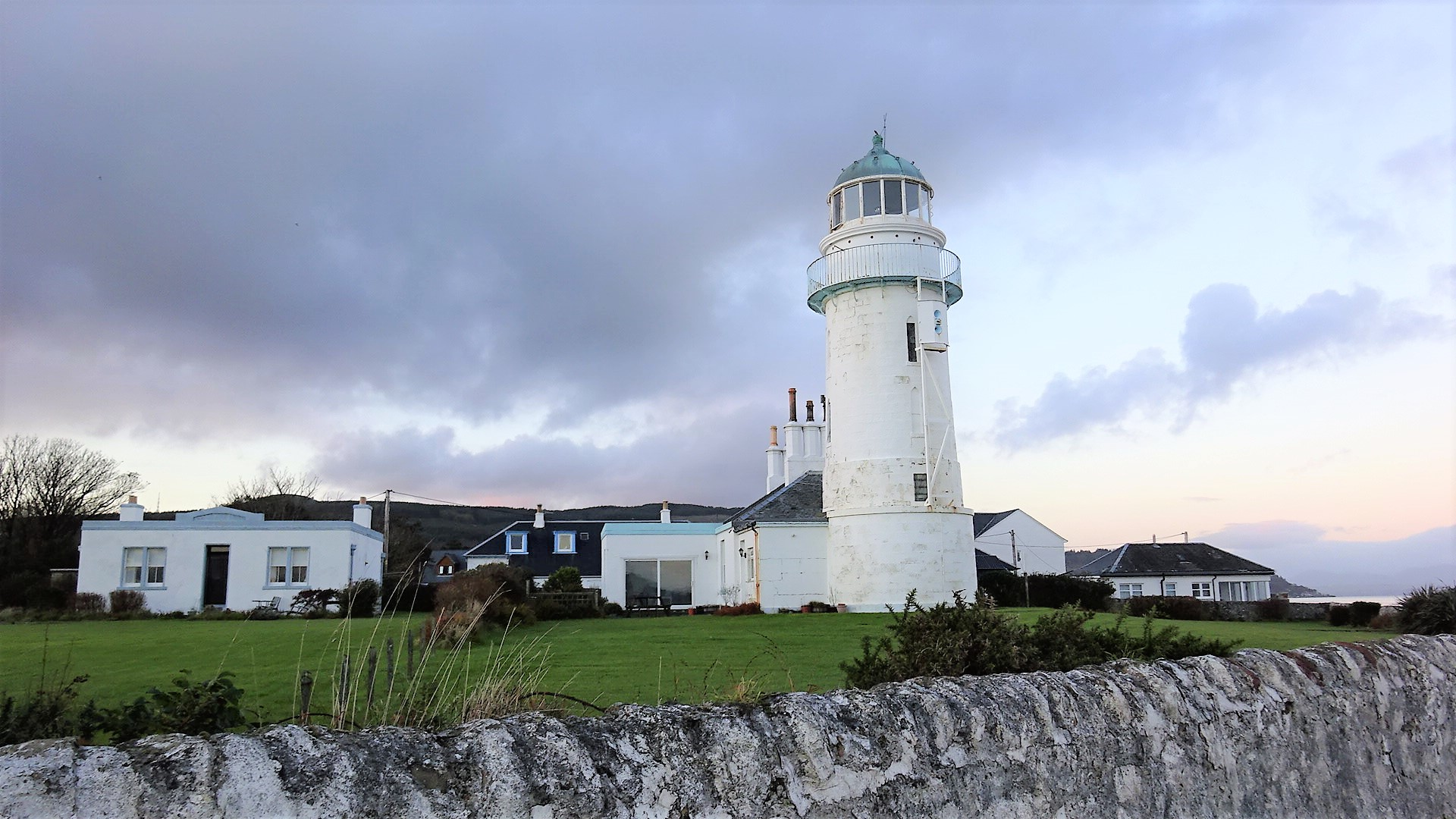
Toward lighthouse

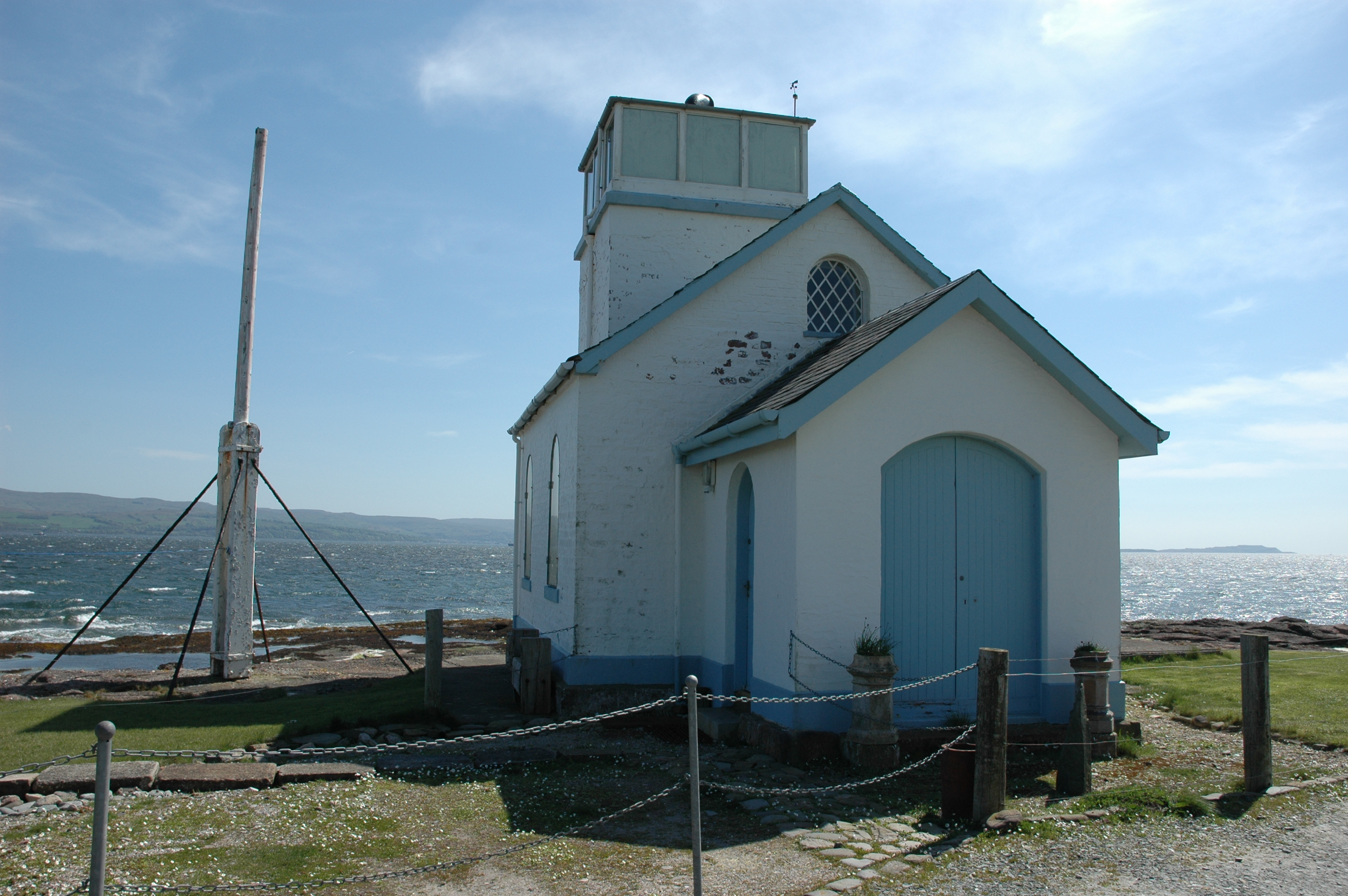
Toward lighthouse foghorn building (decommissioned)

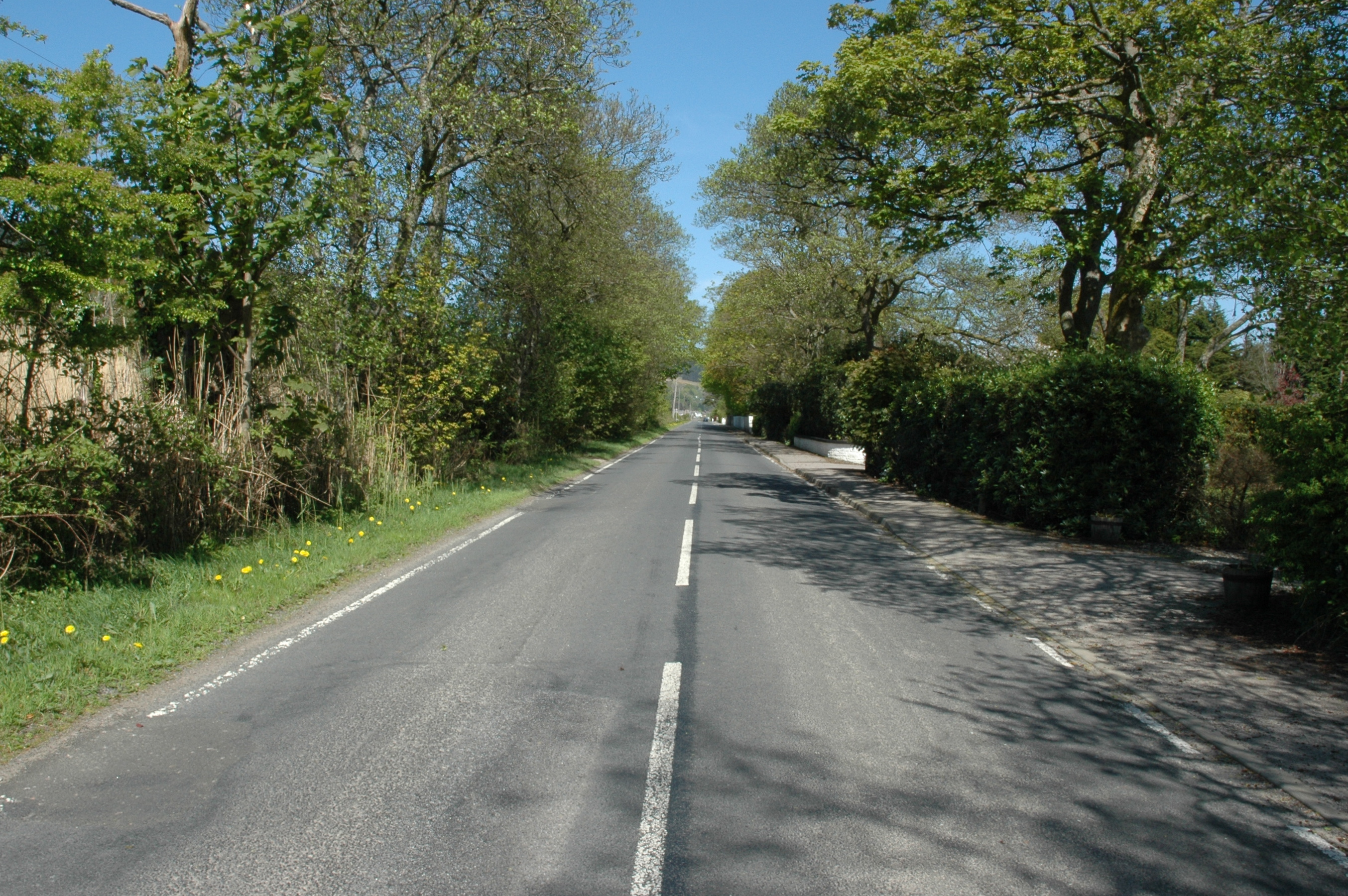
Toward road (A815)
