= Charles Bruce, 3rd Earl of Ailesbury =

British politician

The Right Honourable The Earl of Ailesbury and Elgin
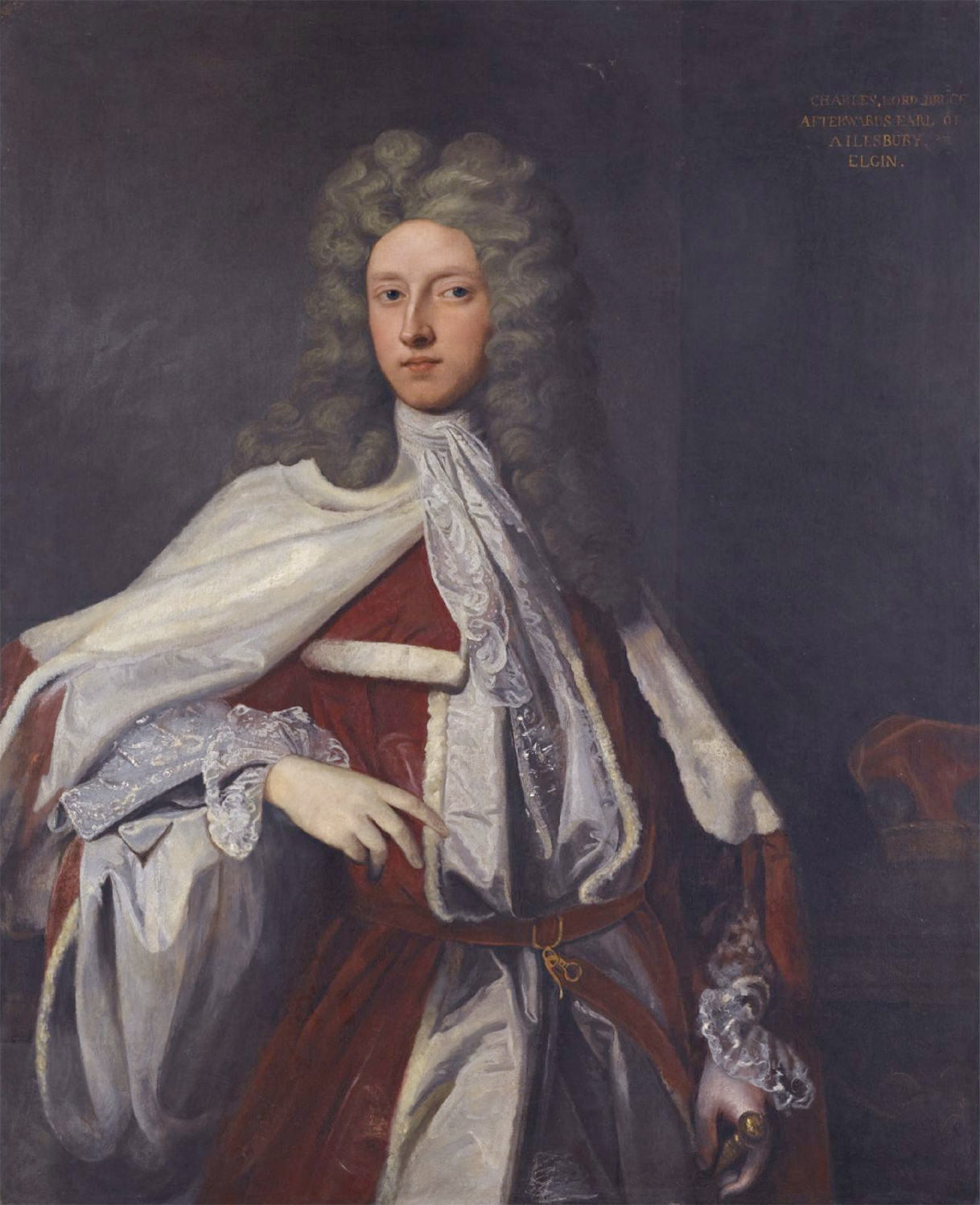
- The Earl of Ailesbury and Elgin.

Personal details
- Born: 29 May 1682
- Died: 10 February 1747 (aged 64)
- Spouse(s): Lady Anne Savile (died 1717); Lady Juliana Boyle (died 1739); Caroline Campbell (1721–1803)
- Children: 5
- Parent(s): Thomas Bruce, 2nd Earl of Ailesbury; Lady Elizabeth Seymour

Charles Bruce, 3rd Earl of Ailesbury (later styled Aylesbury) and 4th Earl of Elgin (29 May 1682 – 10 February 1747), of Ampthill, Bedfordshire and Savernake Park, Wiltshire, styled Viscount Bruce of Ampthill from 1685 to 1741, was a British landowner and Tory politician who sat in the English and British House of Commons from 1705 until 1711 when he was raised to the peerage as one of Harley's Dozen and sat in the House of Lords.

== Background ==
Coats of arms of the Earl of Elgin

Bruce was the son of Thomas Bruce, 2nd Earl of Ailesbury and his first wife Lady Elizabeth Seymour, daughter of Henry Seymour, Lord Beauchamp and Mary Capell. His father was arrested for treason in 1696 and confined to the Tower of London, and his mother died in premature childbirth in 1697, a death probably brought on by a false report that his father had been executed. His father was allowed to leave England soon afterwards: he spent the rest of his life in Flanders, and quickly became content there. He made a happy second marriage to the Belgian noblewoman Charlotte d'Argenteau, comtesse d'Esneux: his children visited him regularly and became deeply attached to their stepmother. The English Crown made no effort to seize the family estates so that there was enough money to allow Bruce to live in comfort.

== Public life ==
Bruce was returned to Parliament for Great Bedwyn at the 1705 English general election, and was returned again at the 1708 British general election. At the 1710 British general election, he was returned for both Great Bedwyn and Marlborough and chose to sit for the latter. In December 1711 he was summoned to the House of Lords through a writ of acceleration in his father's junior title Baron Bruce of Whorlton. In 1741 he succeeded his father in the earldoms of Elgin and Ailesbury. With his two sons having predeceased him, he was in 1746 created Baron Bruce, of Tottenham in the County of Wilts, with a special remainder to his nephew the Honourable Thomas Brudenell.

== Family ==
Lord Ailesbury married, firstly, Lady Anne Savile, daughter of William Savile, 2nd Marquess of Halifax. They had four children:

- Hon. Robert Bruce (d. 30 August 1738), married Frances Blackett (d. 16 July 1750), daughter of Sir William Blackett, 1st Baronet, of Newcastle-upon-Tyne, childless.
- Hon. George Bruce (born before 1717).
- Lady Mary Bruce (1710 – 14 August 1738), married (1728) Henry Brydges, 2nd Duke of Chandos and had children.
- Lady Elizabeth Bruce, married (1732) the Honourable Benjamin Bathurst, son of Allen Bathurst, 1st Earl Bathurst, childless.

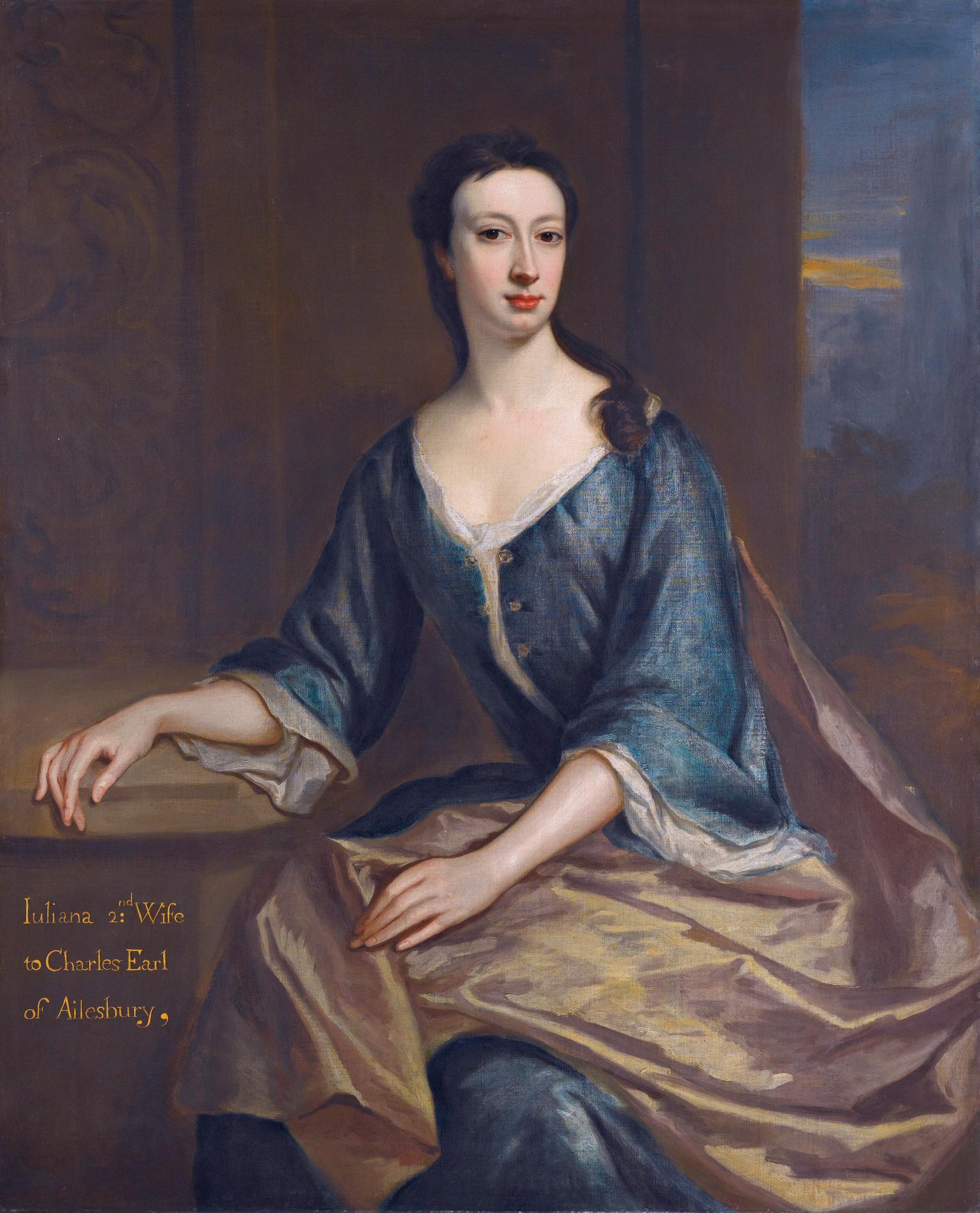
Juliana Boyle (d. 1739) (Jonathan Richardson)

After his first wife's death in July 1717, Lord Ailesbury married, secondly, Lady Juliana Boyle, daughter of Charles Boyle, 2nd Earl of Burlington. They had no children. After her death in March 1739, he married, thirdly, aged 57, the 18-year-old Caroline Campbell, daughter of John Campbell, 4th Duke of Argyll, in 1739. They had one daughter:

- Lady Mary Bruce (16 April 1740 – 5 November 1796), married (1757) Charles Lennox, 3rd Duke of Richmond, childless.

Because neither of his sons survived him or left children, upon his death, the earldom of Elgin and subsidiary Scottish peerages were inherited by his cousin the Earl of Kincardine, while the earldom of Ailesbury and subsidiary English peerages became extinct. The barony of Bruce of Tottenham created for him in 1746 passed upon his death the next year according to the special remainder to his nephew Thomas Brudenell. His Scottish lordship of Kinloss was subsequently determined to have devolved upon James Brydges, 3rd Duke of Chandos, who, however, did not claim the title. The Countess of Ailesbury and Elgin married as her second husband Henry Seymour Conway, by whom she had the sculptor Anne Seymour Damer. She died in January 1803, aged 82.

Parliament of England
Preceded by Sir George Byng; Nicholas Pollexfen	Member of Parliament for Great Bedwyn; 1705–1707; With: Nicholas Pollexfen 1705–1707	Succeeded by Parliament of Great Britain
Parliament of Great Britain
Preceded by Parliament of England	Member of Parliament for Great Bedwyn; 1707–1710; With: Nicholas Pollexfen 1707, 1707–1708; Tracy Pauncefort 1707; Samuel Vanacker Sambrooke 1708–1710; Sir Edward Seymour, Bt 1710–1711	Succeeded by Sir Edward Seymour, Bt; Thomas Millington
Preceded by Hon. James Bruce; Sir Edward Ernle, Bt	Member of Parliament for Marlborough; 1710–1711; With: Hon. Robert Bruce	Succeeded by Hon. Robert Bruce; Richard Jones
Peerage of England
Preceded by Thomas Bruce	Earl of Ailesbury; 1741–1747	Extinct
Preceded by Thomas Bruce	Baron Bruce of Whorlton (writ in acceleration); 1711–1747	Extinct
Peerage of Great Britain
New creation	Baron Bruce; 1746–1747	Succeeded by Thomas Brudenell
Peerage of Scotland
Preceded by Thomas Bruce	Earl of Elgin; 1741–1747	Succeeded by Charles Bruce
Preceded by Thomas Bruce	Lord Kinloss; 1741–1747	Succeeded by James Brydges
