= Mary Lennox, Duchess of Richmond =

Duchess of Richmond (1740–1796)

Her Grace The Duchess of Richmond
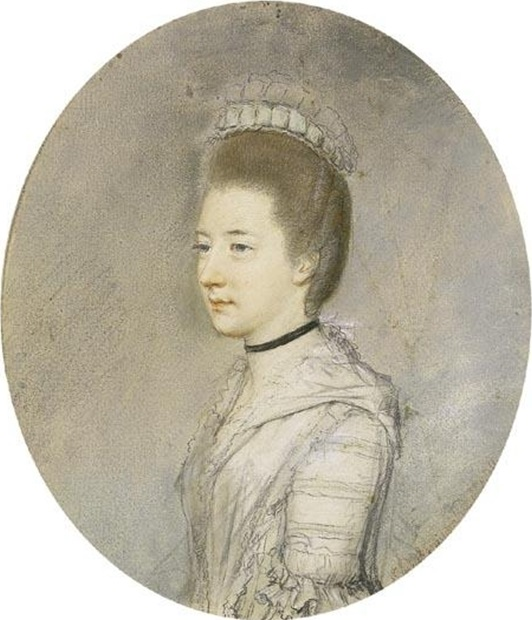
- Portrait by Hugh Douglas Hamilton (1770)
- Born: Mary Bruce; 16 April 1740
- Died: 5 November 1796 (aged 56)
- Spouse: Charles Lennox, 3rd Duke of Richmond (m. 1757)
- Father: Charles Bruce, 3rd Earl of Ailesbury
- Mother: Caroline Campbell

Mary Lennox, Duchess of Richmond (née Bruce; 16 April 1740 – 5 November 1796), was an English noblewoman and peeress as the wife of Charles Lennox, 3rd Duke of Richmond.

== Biography ==
Mary was born on 16 April 1740 as the only daughter of Charles Bruce, 3rd Earl of Ailesbury and his third wife, Caroline Campbell. (Note: Through her mother's second marriage with Lord Frederick Campbell, Mary was a half-sister of their child, Anne Seymour Damer.)

=== Marriage ===
On 1 April 1757, she married Charles Lennox, 3rd Duke of Richmond. The wedding was held at the house of Major-General Henry Seymour Conway in Warwick Street, St James, with the consent of the Major-General, one of Mary's guardians, by special licence of the Dean and Chapter of Canterbury Cathedral, given the then vacancy of the See of Canterbury, and performed by Frederick Keppel, then Canon of Windsor and the future Bishop of Exeter. On 5 November 1796, Mary died at the age of 56.

== Gallery ==
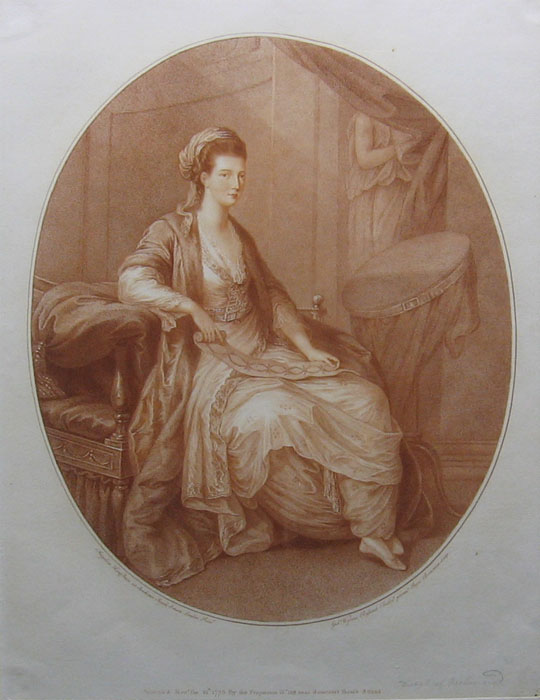
Engraving by William Wynne Ryland after Angelica Kauffman (1775)

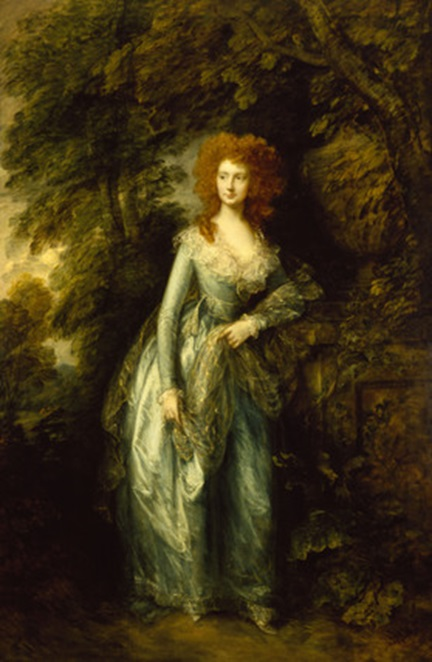
Portrait by Thomas Gainsborough (1786–1787)
