= Caroline Bruce, Countess of Ailesbury =

British aristocrat (1721–1803)

The Countess of Ailesbury and Elgin
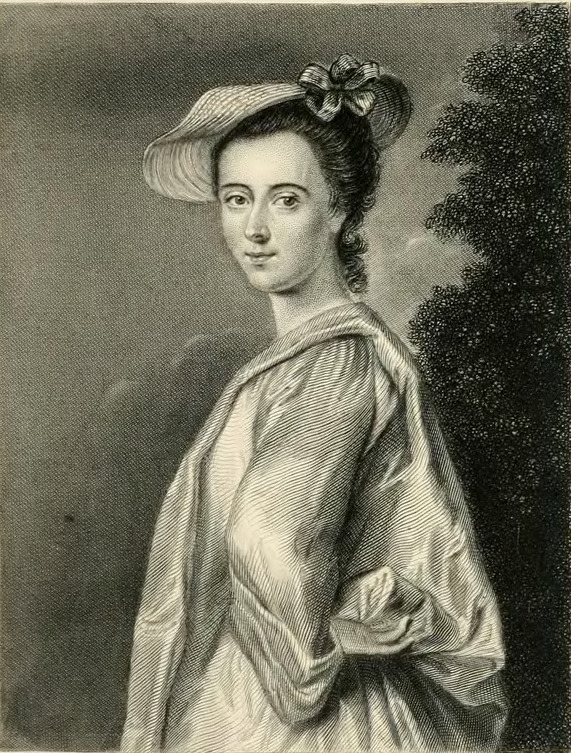
- Lady Caroline, unknown date
- Born: Caroline Campbell; 1721
- Died: 17 January 1803 (aged 81–82)
- Buried: Sundridge, Kent
- Spouses: Charles Bruce, 3rd Earl of Ailesbury (m. 1739; died 1747) Henry Seymour Conway (m. 1747; died 1795)
- Issue: Mary Lennox, Duchess of Richmond; Anne Seymour Damer
- Father: John Campbell, 4th Duke of Argyll
- Mother: Mary Bellenden

Caroline Bruce, Countess of Ailesbury (née Campbell, later Conway; 12 January 1721 – 17 January 1803) was a British society hostess active in the Georgian era. Born to courtiers, at age eighteen she married Lord Bruce (later Lord Ailesbury). His death in 1747 left her a wealthy widow, after which she married Henry Seymour Conway, a British Army officer and politician.

Her second marriage was happy and she occasionally accompanied her husband in his stationing abroad. Well-connected to prominent families, she hosted parties and was a patron of the arts, including of Angelica Kauffman and Elizabeth Farren. She was the mother of Mary Lennox, Duchess of Richmond and the sculptor Anne Seymour Damer.

== Early life and family ==
Caroline Campbell was born in 1721 to courtiers who served at Kensington Palace. Her father was John Campbell, a groom of the bedchamber to the Prince of Wales who eventually became a lieutenant colonel and in 1761 succeeded his cousin as 4th Duke of Argyll. Her mother, Mary Bellenden, was a maid of honour to Caroline, Princess of Wales from 1715 to 1720, leading the princess to be appointed as Caroline's namesake and godmother. The young Caroline had four brothers, including John, 5th Duke of Argyll. Her mother died from childbirth when Caroline was fifteen.

== Marriages ==
At age eighteen, on 13 June 1739, Caroline married Lord Bruce as his third wife, despite him being fifty-seven years old and thus older than her father. Of the match, the writer Mary Delany commented on Caroline's lack of wealth, writing that "her father can give her no fortune, she is very pretty, well behaved, and just eighteen, has £2,000 a year jointure and £400 pin money. They say he is cross, covetous, and three score old, this unsuitable marriage is the admiration of the old, and the envy of the young".

After the marriage, Caroline was known as Lady Bruce. Two years later, her husband succeeded his father as 3rd Earl of Ailesbury and 4th Earl of Elgin. Along with the titles, he inherited substantial wealth and estates including Tottenham Park. They had one daughter, Lady Mary Bruce, who later married the 3rd Duke of Richmond. Lord Ailesbury died on 10 February 1747, leaving his widow rich with a jointure of £3,000 a year; Savile House, his residence in Leicester Square; and half of his considerable jewel collection.

Caroline did not wait long to remarry. On 19 December 1747 in the chapel of Somerset House, Caroline married the Hon. Henry Seymour Conway, a British Army officer and politician and younger son of Francis, 1st Baron Conway. The politician and writer Horace Walpole, a cousin of her new husband, (Note: Henry Seymour Conway was a favourite cousin and friend of Horace Walpole's, who came to view Caroline as a sister.) considered it a love match, and their marriage has been described as happy in various sources. Despite her second marriage, she continued to be referred to as Lady Ailesbury, as was the custom. On 26 October 1748, they had a daughter, Anne Seymour Damer, who later acquired fame as a sculptor.

== Later life ==
A year into their marriage, the Conways leased Latimer House in Buckinghamshire from the Cavendish family, living there until 1751. Henry was required to join his regiment in Minorca as their commander, so Caroline and their daughter moved in with her father at Coombe Bank. When her husband returned, he purchased a home called Park Place in Henley-on-Thames. He was once again required to join his regiment, this time in Sligo, Ireland; Caroline joined him, and they lived there for four months. In 1755, when her husband was appointed Chief Secretary for Ireland, Caroline lived with him at Dublin Castle. During their travels, their younger daughter Anne often stayed with Horace Walpole, who was close to the couple and treated Anne as a favourite niece.

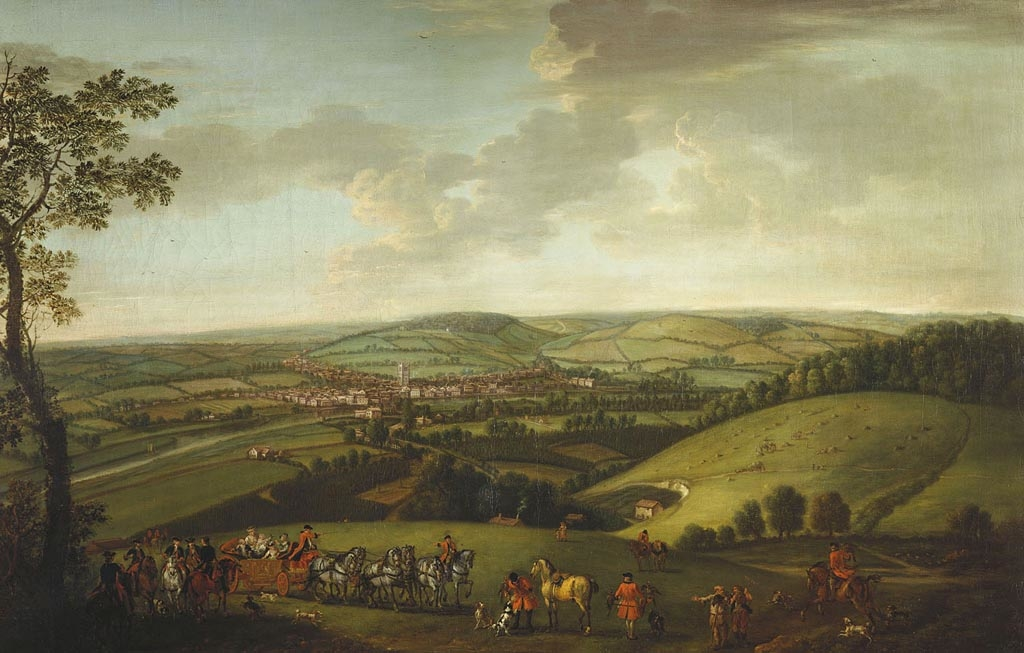
Henley-on-Thames, c. 1743

At Park Place, Caroline and her husband prioritised the planting of trees, including the first Lombardy Poplar in England. She also focused her attention on a lavender farm and helped with its expansion, possibly leading to an increase in the flower's popularity elsewhere. They also purchased an old London residence called Warwick House and renamed it Conway House. There, Caroline frequently hosted card game parties and often hosted Princess Amelia, a daughter of King George II known for her gambling. Henry's secretary later set fire to Conway House to hide his cash theft, leading to his hanging.

In the early 1750s, Caroline advocated for the release of Mary Blandy, who was accused of murdering her father with powdered arsenic. Blandy's defence was that her lover, Captain William Cranstoun, had told her it was a love potion meant to persuade her father to allow them to marry. Caroline's efforts to obtain a pardon were unsuccessful and the case ended with Blandy's hanging.

To support her husband's political career, Caroline often hosted parties, though she did not enjoy involving herself in political matters. She also had many intellectual interests. She loved music and often hosted parties on the subject. She was known for her adept needlework and often produced reproductions of famous paintings. She and her husband were patrons of the arts and had friendships with the prominent artists Joshua Reynolds and Angelica Kauffman; they commissioned the latter to produce portraits of their two daughters.

Caroline served as Elizabeth Farren’s earliest patron when the young Irish actress came to London, at the behest of her sister-in-law Emily, Duchess of Leinster. Caroline was well-read and had a connection to the Enlightenment philosopher Jean-Jacques Rousseau, having met him in 1766 when he came to England; her husband secured him a pension of £100 a year. She enjoyed discussing books and was the acquaintance of many other literary figures such as William Shenstone, who dedicated a poem to the Conways:

Here too shall Conway's name appear:
He prais'd the stream so lovely clear,
That shone the reeds among;
Yet clearness could it not disclose,
To match the rhetoric that flows
From Conway's polished tongue.

But what can courts discover more
Than these rude haunts have seen before,
Each fount and shady tree?
Have not these trees and fountains seen
The pride of courts, the winning mien
Of peerless Aylesbury?

=== Widowhood and death ===
By 1789, her daughter Anne's career as a sculptor had advanced such that she completed a marble bust of her mother, which was later bequeathed to Lady Louisa Johnston, a cousin. On 9 July 1795, Henry Seymour Conway died at Park Place after experiencing stomach cramps. His will left Park Place to Caroline, who promptly sold it in favour of living with Anne, who had also by now been widowed. At age eighty-three, Lady Ailesbury died on 17 January 1803 after a long illness. In a letter, Anne described the condition as impacting her mother’s lungs and ability to breathe. Caroline was buried at the church at Sundridge, Kent. After Anne's death in 1828, she was buried alongside her mother.
