= Anne Seymour Damer =

British sculptor (1748–1828)

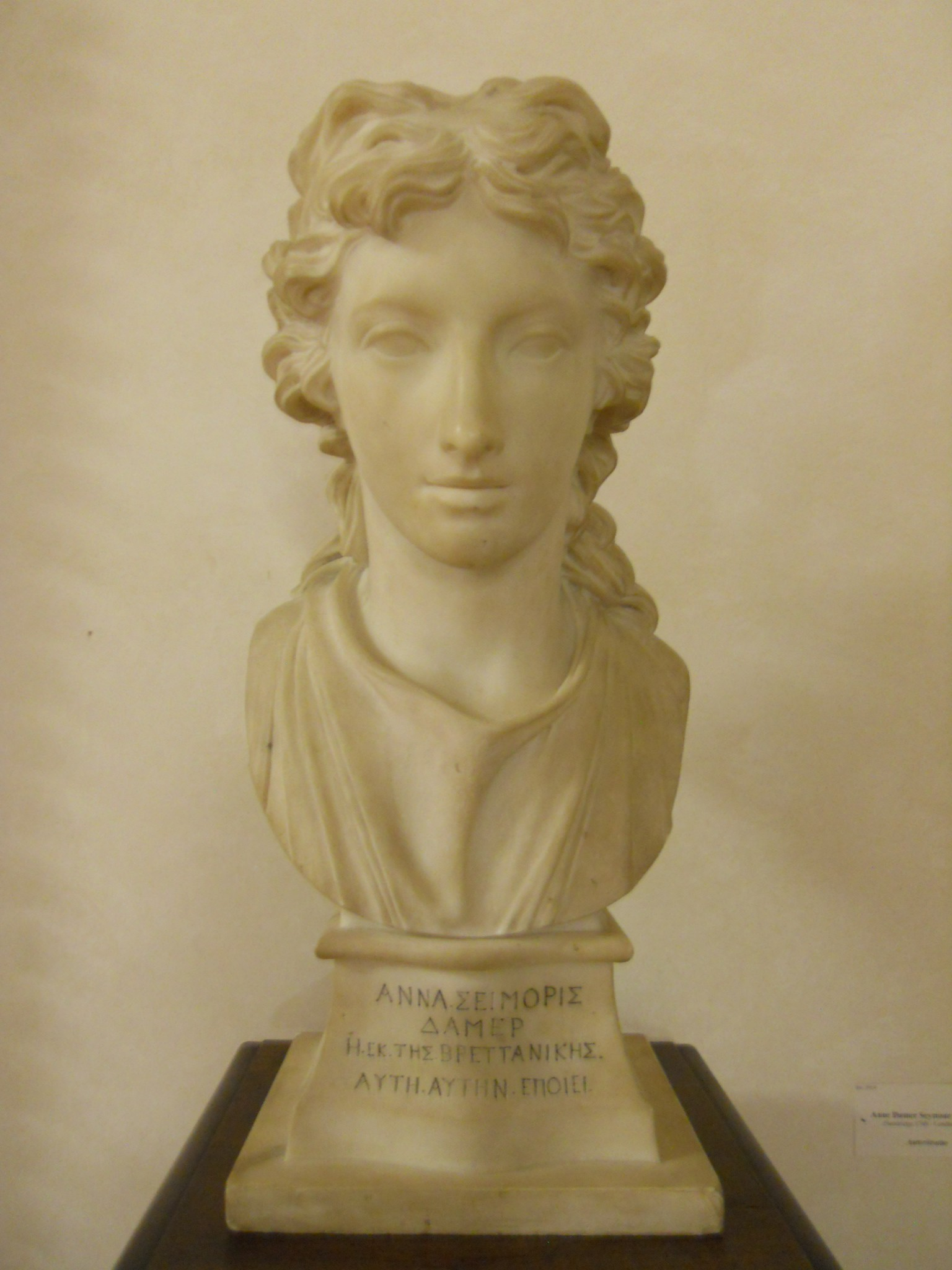
- Anne Seymour Damer's self-portrait bust at the Vasari Corridor of the Uffizi gallery The Greek inscription reads: ΑΝΝΑ ΣΕΙΜΟΡΙΣ ΔΑΜΕΡ Η ΕΚ ΤΗΣ ΒΡΕΤΤΑΝΙΚΗΣ ΑΥΤΗ ΑΥΤΗΝ ΕΠΟΙΕΙ ("Anne Seymour Damer from Britain, made herself")
- Born: Anne Seymour Conway; 26 October 1748; Sevenoaks, Kent, England
- Died: 28 May 1828 (aged 79); Mayfair, London, England
- Resting place: St Mary, Church Road, Sundridge, Kent
- Spouse: John Damer (m. 1767; died 1776)
- Parents: Henry Seymour Conway; Lady Caroline Bruce

Anne Seymour Damer (née Conway; 26 October 1748 – 28 May 1828) was an English sculptor. Described as a "female genius" by Horace Walpole, she was trained in sculpture by Giuseppe Ceracchi and John Bacon. Influenced by the Enlightenment, Damer was an author, traveller, theatrical producer and actress, as well as a sculptor.

She exhibited regularly at the Royal Academy from 1784 to 1818 and was a close friend to members of Georgian high society, including Horace Walpole and the politician Charles James Fox. It is believed that Damer was a lesbian and was in a relationship with the actress Elizabeth Farren.

== Life ==
Anne Seymour Conway was born in Sevenoaks into an aristocratic Whig family. She was the only daughter of Field-Marshal Henry Seymour Conway (1721–1795) and his wife Lady Caroline Bruce, born Campbell, Lady Ailesbury (1721–1803). Her father was a nephew of Robert Walpole, Britain's first prime minister. Walpole's son, Horace Walpole, was her godfather, and Anne spent much of her childhood in his home in Strawberry Hill. Her mother was the daughter of the Duke of Argyll. She was brought up at the family home at Park Place in Berkshire. She was highly educated and taught at home. By the time she was seventeen, she was introduced into society.

In 1766 at the age of 17, Damer was sketched by Angelica Kauffman in the character of the goddess Ceres, a work now held at St Mary's University, Twickenham. In 1800, an unknown artist (possibly Kauffman) completed a painting with the same composition as the sketch. The painting preceded Damer's launch into Society and her entrance into the marriage market.

In 1767 she married John Damer, the son of Lord Milton, later the 1st Earl of Dorchester. The couple received an income of £5,000 from Lord Milton, and were left large fortunes by Milton and Henry Conway. Damer was described as a poor businessman, who had a taste for expensive clothing. The marriage was not a successful one. The couple had no children and separated after seven years.

In 1775, Anne was included in a painting titled The Three Witches from Macbeth by Daniel Gardner (c. 1750 – 1805), which can be found in the National Portrait Gallery, London. The work shows her next to other ladies of high society: Elizabeth Lamb, Viscountess Melbourne and Georgiana, Duchess of Devonshire.

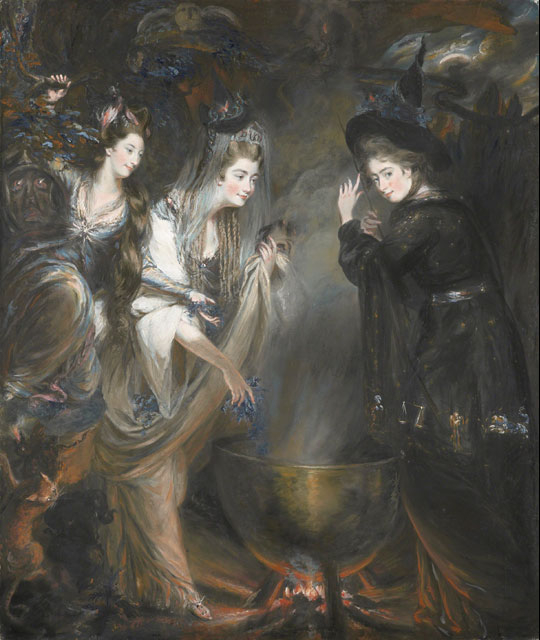
Anne Damer with the Duchess of Devonshire and Lady Melbourne in Witches Round the Cauldron by Daniel Gardner (1775)

Damer's husband died by suicide in 1776, leaving considerable debts. As a widow, Damer benefitted from a prenuptial agreement whereby her father-in-law was obliged to pay her £2500 a year. This money allowed her to be financially independent, and continue her artistic career, whilst maintaining a full social life, on a more intellectual plane than that of her earlier married years.

Damer was a frequent visitor to Europe. In 1779, she had watched from the deck, a four-hour running gunfight between a French privateer and the cross-Channel packet boat on which she was travelling. During one voyage she was captured by a privateer, but released unharmed in Jersey. In 1790–91, she travelled alone through Portugal and Spain and back through revolutionary France. She visited Sir Horace Mann in Florence, and Sir William Hamilton in Naples, where she was introduced to Lord Nelson.

In 1801, she published a novel, Belmour, a book she had written in Lisbon. It ran to three editions and was translated into French. In 1802, while the Treaty of Amiens was in effect, she visited Paris with the author Mary Berry and was granted an audience with Napoleon.

A fluent French speaker, Damer became friends with Josephine Buonaparte. They corresponded about gardening and plants, mostly in connection to Josephine's garden at Malmaison. Anne had also discussed this with Sir Joseph Banks, one of the founders of the Royal Horticultural Society. A sculptural bust she made of Banks can be found in the British Museum. In 1815, she travelled to Elba, the island where Napoleon had been exiled. She travelled there despite the ongoing war between France and Britain. The Emperor gifted her a snuff box featuring his portrait, which is housed in the British Museum.

When Horace Walpole died in 1797, he left a life interest in Strawberry Hill to Damer. She had the job of recording the contents of Strawberry Hill for the Berry family, who had moved into an adjoining property. Anne used Strawberry Hill as her country house until 1811, which she maintained alongside her central London home in Upper Brook Street. In 1818, she returned to Twickenham, buying York House.

From 1818, Anne Damer lived at York House, Twickenham. She continued to sculpt until the end of her life. She died, aged 79, in 1828 at her London house, 27 Upper Brook Street, Grosvenor Square. She was buried in the church at Sundridge, Kent.

According to Richard Webb, she directed in her will that her correspondence be destroyed and that she be buried with the bones of her dog and her sculpting tools.

== Works ==
The development of Anne Seymour Damer's interest in sculpture is credited to David Hume (who served as Under-Secretary when her father was Secretary of State, 1766–1768) and to the encouragement of Horace Walpole, who was her guardian during her parents' frequent trips abroad. According to Walpole, her training included lessons in modelling from Giuseppe Ceracchi, in marble carving from John Bacon, and in anatomy from William Cumberland Cruikshank.

During the period 1784–1818, Damer exhibited 32 works as an honorary exhibitor at the Royal Academy. Her work, primarily busts in Neoclassical style, developed from early wax sculptures to technically complex ones in works in terracotta, bronze and marble. Her subjects, largely drawn from friends and colleagues in Whig circles, included Lady Melbourne, Nelson, Joseph Banks, George III, Mary Berry, Charles James Fox and herself. She executed several actors' portraits, such as the busts of her friends Sarah Siddons and Elizabeth Farren (as the Muses Melpomene and Thalia).

She produced keystone sculptures of Isis and Tamesis for each side of the central arch on the bridge at Henley-on-Thames. The original models are in the Henley Gallery of the River and Rowing Museum nearby. Another major architectural work was her 10-foot statue of Apollo, now destroyed, for the frontage of Drury Lane theatre. She also created two bas-reliefs for the Boydell Shakespeare Gallery of scenes from Coriolanus and Antony and Cleopatra.

== Gallery ==
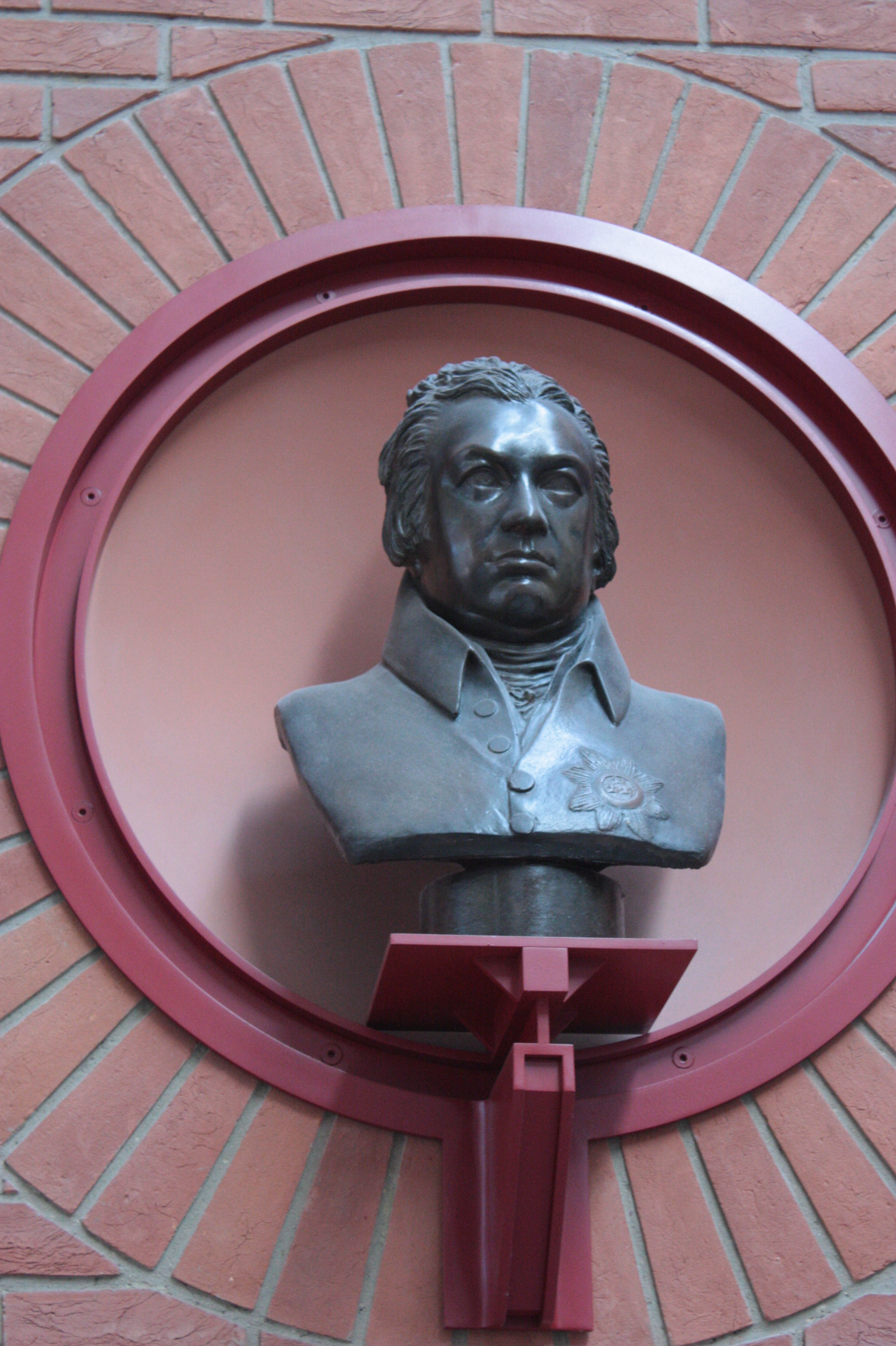
Sir Joseph Banks by Anne Seymour Damer

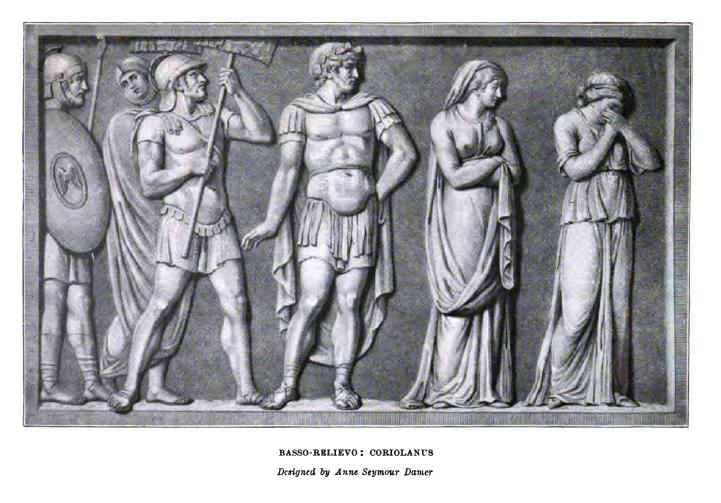
Engraving of Coriolanus (c. 1789), one of two bas-reliefs created by Damer for the Boydell Shakespeare Gallery

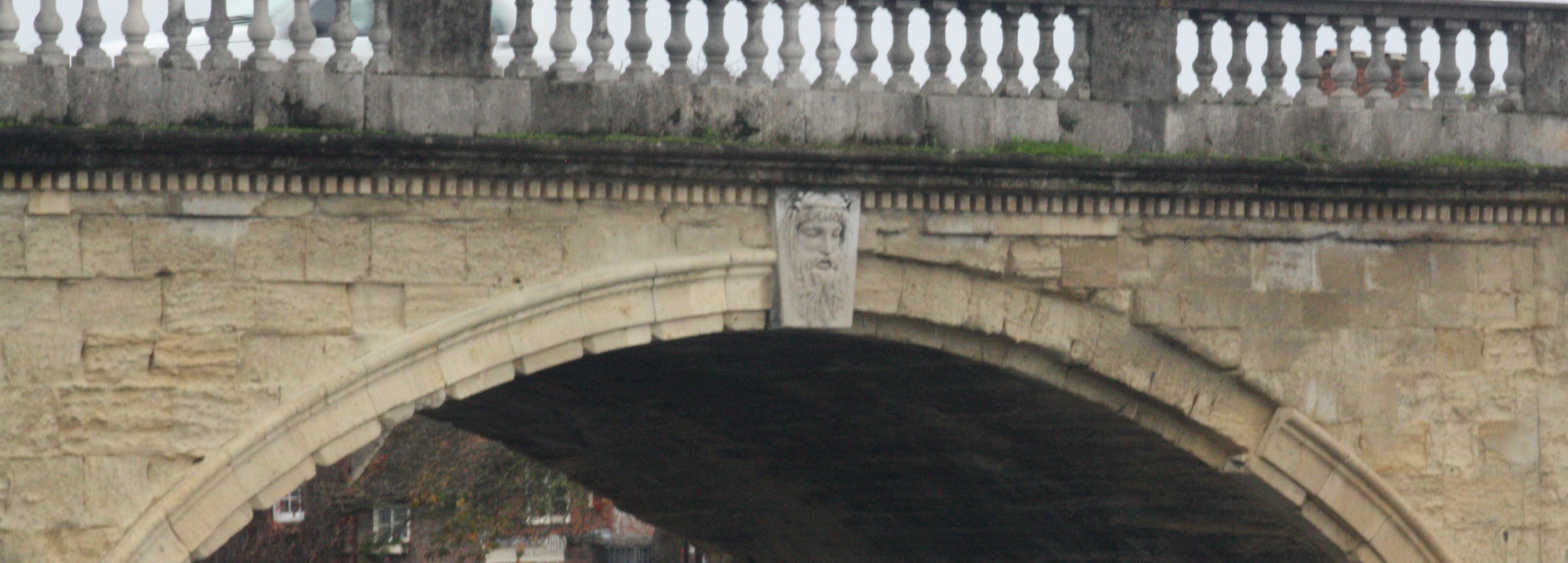
Sculpture of Tamesis. Downstream keystone of the central arch of Henley Bridge

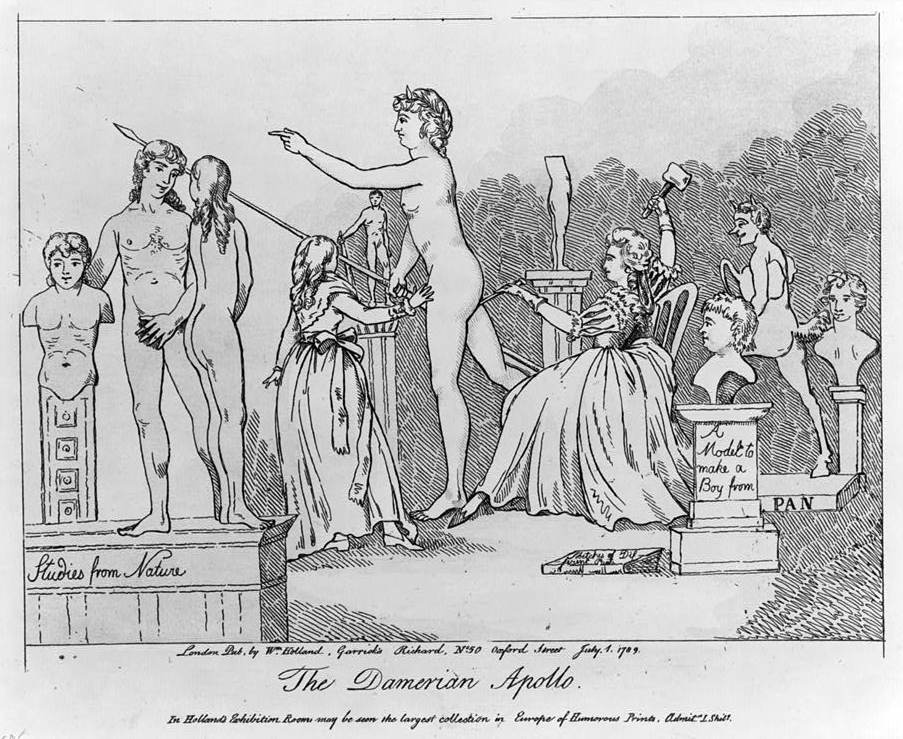
"The Damerian Apollo". 1798 caricature of Anne Seymour Damer chiselling the posterior of a large Apollo

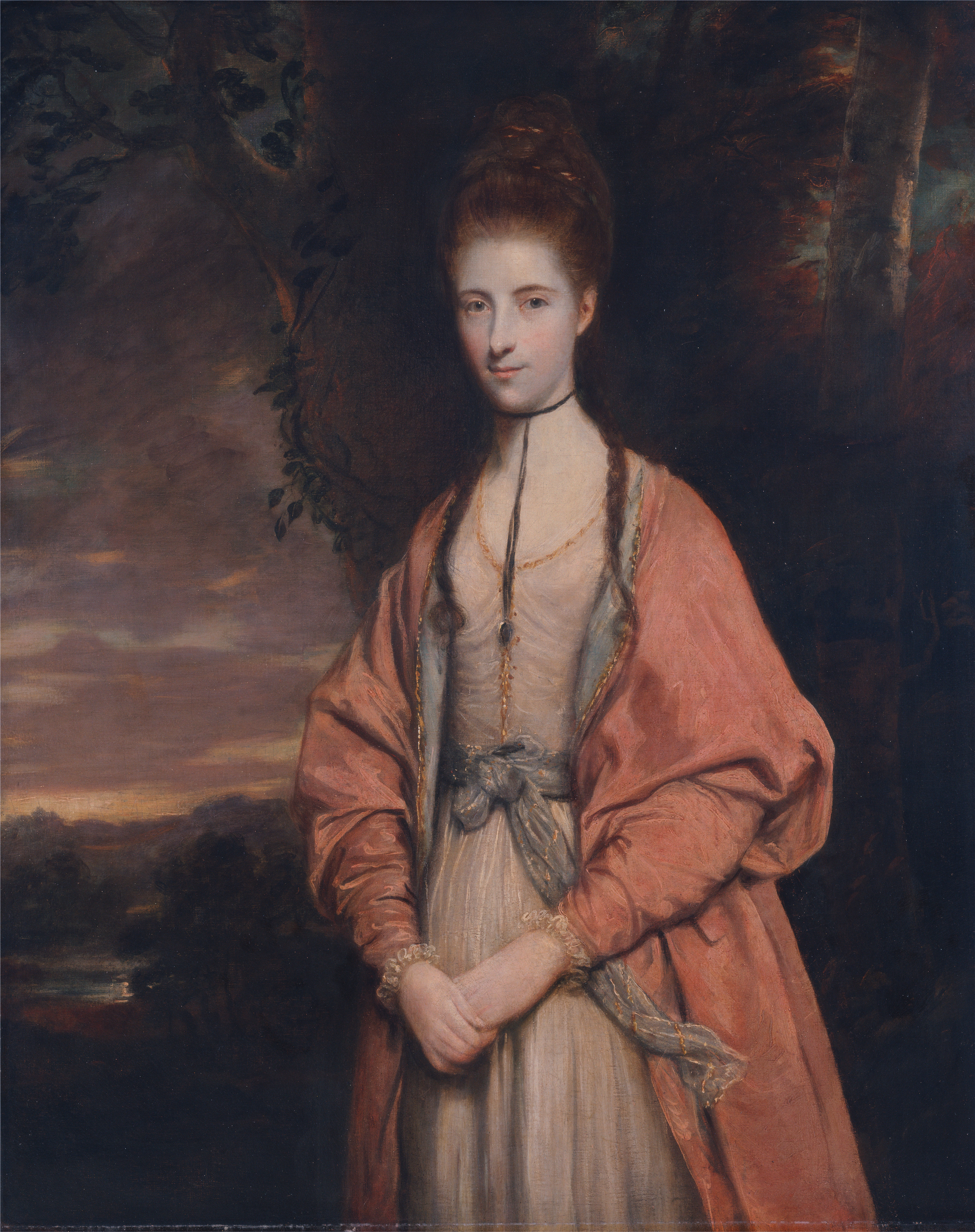
Anne Seymour Damer, by Joshua Reynolds (1723–1792)

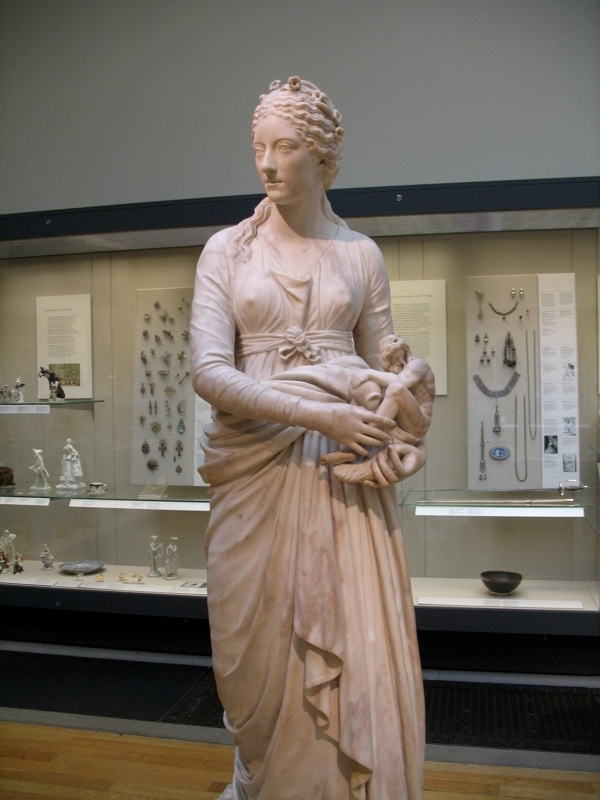
Statue of Anne Seymour Damer, by Giuseppe Ceracchi

== Personal life ==
Damer's friends included a number of influential Whigs and aristocrats. Her guardian and friend Horace Walpole was a significant figure, who helped foster her career and on his death left her his London villa, Strawberry Hill. She also moved in literary and theatrical circles, where her friends included the poet and dramatist Joanna Baillie, the author Mary Berry, and the actors Sarah Siddons and Elizabeth Farren. She frequently took part in masques at the Pantheon and amateur theatricals at the London residence of the Duke of Richmond, who was married to her half-sister, Lady Mary Bruce

A number of sources have named Damer as being involved in lesbian relationships, particularly relating to her close friendship with Mary Berry, to whom she had been introduced by Walpole in 1789, and with whom she lived together in her later years. Even during her marriage, her likings for male clothing and demonstrative friendships with other women were publicly noted and satirised by hostile commentators such as Hester Thrale and in the anonymous pamphlet A Sapphick Epistle from Jack Cavendish to the Honourable and most Beautiful, Mrs D— (c. 1770).

A romance between Damer and Elizabeth Farren, who was mentioned by Thrale, is the central storyline in the 2004 novel Life Mask by Emma Donoghue.
