= Mary Campbell of Mamore =

Scottish courtier (bap. 1685, d. 1736)

Mary Campbell
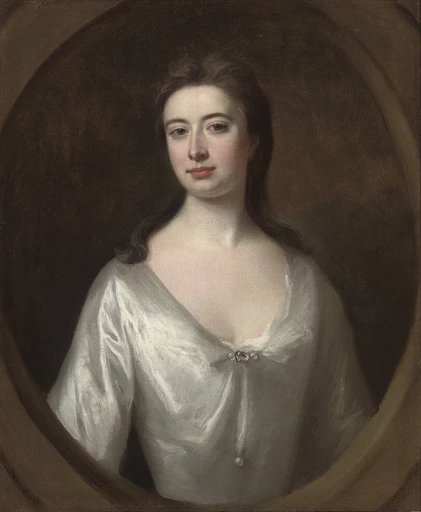
- Portrait of a lady, traditionally identified as Mary Campbell of Mamore
- Full name: Mary Campbell of Mamore
- Baptised: 4 May 1685
- Died: 18 December 1736
- Offices: maid of honour to Caroline of Ansbach
- Spouse: John Campbell
- Issue: 6, including: John Campbell, 5th Duke of Argyll; Lord Frederick Campbell; Lord William Campbell
- Father: John Drummond Bellenden, 2nd Lord Bellenden of Broughton
- Mother: Lady Mary Ramsay, Countess Dowager of Dalhousie

Mary Campbell of Mamore born Mary Bellenden (baptised 1685 – 1736) was a Scottish aristocrat who was a maid of honour to Caroline of Ansbach. She was rumoured to have had an affair with the Prince of Wales, but she married his groom of the bedchamber John Campbell of Momore (later the Duke of Argyll).

== Life ==
She was one of the seven children of Lady Mary Ramsay, Countess Dowager of Dalhousie and her second husband John Drummond Bellenden, 2nd Lord Bellenden of Broughton. She was their third daughter and she was baptised in Edinburgh on 4 May 1685. She had an advantageous friendship with Mary Ker who was the wife of her cousin (John Ker, 1st Duke of Roxburghe) and Mary Ker proposed to Caroline of Ansbach (the Princess of Wales) that Mary should become her maid of honour.

Court life had become more entertaining with the new Prince and Princess of Wales and Mary had significant admirers. Lord Hervey and Horace Walpole were on record for admiring her charms. The poets Alexander Pope and John Gay wrote poems that referenced her while the Prince of Wales was among the men at court who had her in their plans. For four years she avoided gossip but Lord Hervey believed that she and the Prince were involved.

== Marriage and children ==
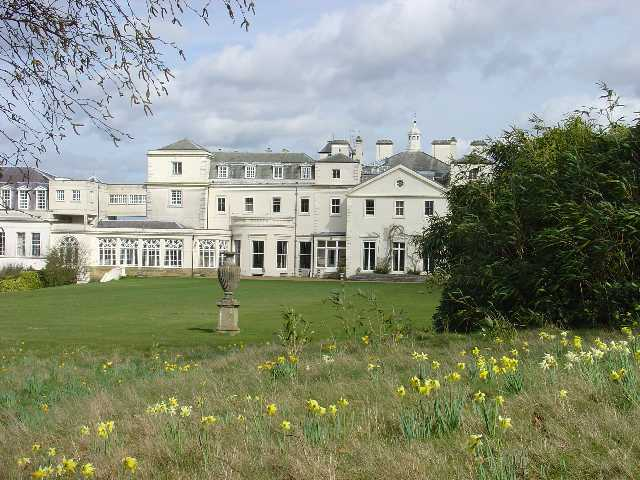
Coombe Bank House, now a school

In 1720, she married John Campbell of Momore in secret. She had told the Prince that she would ask his blessing on any marriage but she broke this promise and married. She lost her position but John Campbell retained his job as a Groom of the Bedchamber. They moved to Combe Bank.

They had six children, including:

- Caroline Campbell (born 12 January 1721, died 17 January 1803)
- Field Marshal John Campbell, 5th Duke of Argyll (born June 1723, died 24 May 1806)
- Lord Frederick Campbell (born 20 June 1729, died 8 June 1816)
- Lord William Campbell (born 1731, died 1778)

Mary Campbell of Mamore died in childbirth in 1736.
