= Portrait of Henry Seymour Conway =

Painting by Thomas Gainsborough

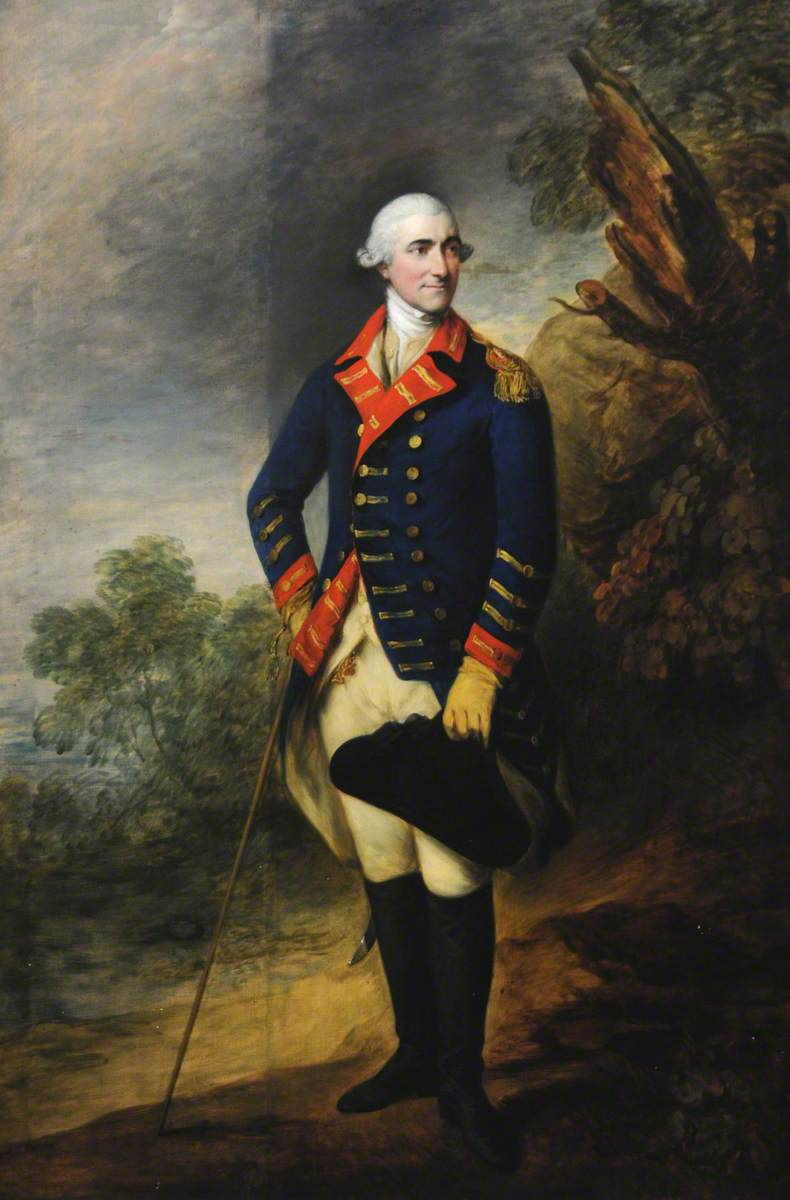
- Artist: Thomas Gainsborough
- Year: 1780
- Type: Oil on canvas, portrait painting
- Dimensions: 300 cm × 150 cm (120 in × 59 in)
- Location: Royal Court House; Jersey

Portrait of Henry Seymour Conway is an oil on canvas portrait painting by the British artist Thomas Gainsborough, from 1780. It depicts the soldier and politician Henry Seymour Conway.

Conway had a distinguished military career seeing action on the War of the Austrian Succession and Seven Years' War and eventually rising to the rank of Field Marshal. From 1783 to 1793, he was Commander-in-Chief of the Forces, the most senior post in the British Army. In politics he was a Whig who held high office under several Prime Ministers, serving as Irish Secretary, Southern Secretary and Northern Secretary.

Today the painting hangs in the Royal Court House, in Saint Helier, on Jersey. A mezzotint based on the picture was produced in 1874 by Richard Josey.

== Bibliography ==
- Hamilton, James. Gainsborough: A Portrait. Hachette UK, 2017.
- Ingamells, John. National Portrait Gallery Mid-Georgian Portraits, 1760–1790. National Portrait Gallery, 2004.
