= 72nd Regiment of Foot (1758) =

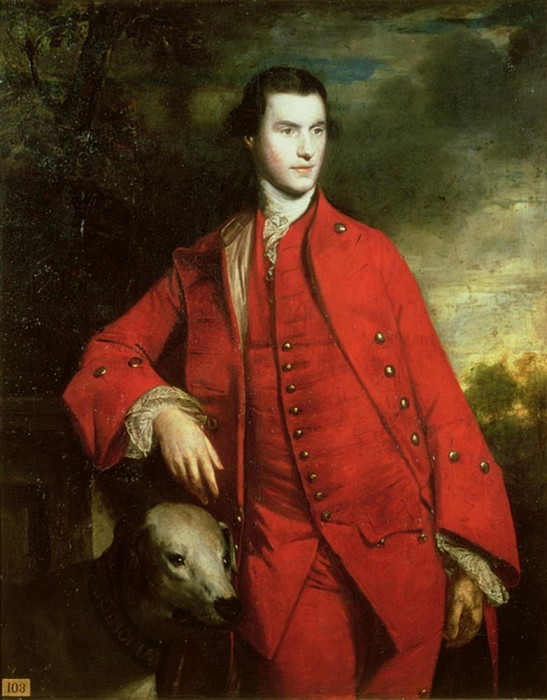
- 1758 portrait of the Duke of Richmond, the regimental colonel
- Active: 1758–1763
- Country: Great Britain
- Branch: British Army
- Type: Line infantry
- Size: 1 Battalion
- Engagements: Seven Years' War; Raid on Cherbourg; Capture of Belle Île

The 72nd Regiment of Foot was a line infantry regiment of the British Army. It was raised on 28 April 1758 from the 2nd Battalion of the 33rd Regiment of Foot and took part in the successful raid on Cherbourg in 1758 and the capture of Belle Île from France in 1761. Following a tour of duty in British-occupied Cuba the regiment was disbanded in 1763.

== Regimental Colonels ==
- 1758–1763: Charles Lennox, 3rd Duke of Richmond

== Notable members ==
- Robert Prescott, who later became governor general of Canada, served as the regiment's lieutenant-colonel in 1762
