= Henry Seymour Conway =

British Army officer and politician (1721–1795)

Field Marshal The Right Honourable Henry Seymour Conway
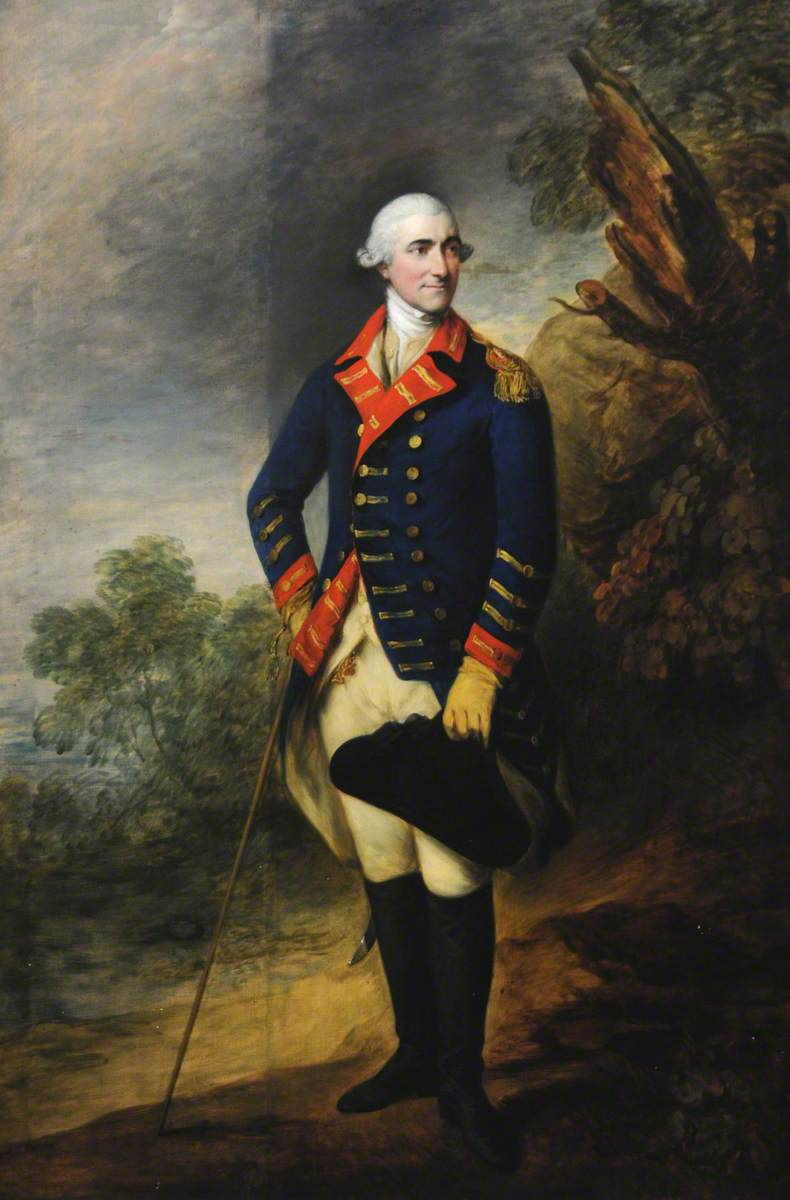
- Portrait of Henry Seymour Conway by Thomas Gainsborough, 1780

Secretary of State for the Northern Department
- In office 23 May 1766 – 20 January 1768
- Monarch: George III
- Prime Minister: The Earl of Chatham
- Preceded by: The Duke of Grafton
- Succeeded by: The Viscount Weymouth

Leader of the House of Commons
- In office 14 July 1765 – 20 January 1768
- Monarch: George III
- Prime Minister: The Marquess of Rockingham; The Earl of Chatham
- Preceded by: George Grenville
- Succeeded by: Lord North

Secretary of State for the Southern Department
- In office 12 July 1765 – 23 May 1766
- Monarch: George III
- Prime Minister: The Marquess of Rockingham
- Preceded by: The Earl of Halifax
- Succeeded by: The Duke of Richmond and Lennox

Chief Secretary for Ireland
- In office 1755–1757
- Monarch: George II
- Lieutenant: The Duke of Devonshire
- Preceded by: Lord George Sackville
- Succeeded by: Richard Rigby

Personal details
- Born: 1721 Chelsea, Middlesex; Great Britain
- Died: 9 July 1795 (aged 73–74) Henley-on-Thames, Berkshire; Great Britain
- Spouse: Caroline Bruce, Countess of Ailesbury (m. 1747)
- Children: Anne Seymour Damer
- Parent: Francis Seymour-Conway, 1st Baron Conway (father)

Military service
- Allegiance: Great Britain
- Branch/service: British Army
- Years of service: 1737–1793
- Rank: Field Marshal
- Battles/wars: War of the Austrian Succession; Jacobite Rebellion of 1745; Seven Years' War

Field Marshal Henry Seymour Conway PC PC (Ire) (1721 – 9 July 1795) was a British Army officer and politician. A brother of the 1st Marquess of Hertford, and cousin of Horace Walpole, he began his military career in the War of the Austrian Succession. He held various political offices including Chief Secretary for Ireland, Secretary of State for the Southern Department, Leader of the House of Commons and Secretary of State for the Northern Department. He eventually rose to the position of Commander-in-Chief of the Forces.

== Family and education ==
Conway was the second son of Francis Seymour-Conway, 1st Baron Conway (whose elder brother Popham Seymour-Conway had inherited the Conway estates) by his third wife, Charlotte Seymour-Conway (née Shorter). He entered Eton College in 1732 and from that time enjoyed a close friendship with his cousin Horace Walpole.

== Early army career ==
Conway joined the Molesworth's Regiment of Dragoons on 27 June 1737 as a lieutenant. He was transferred to the 1st Foot Guards and was promoted to captain on 14 February 1741 and to captain-lieutenant (the equivalent of lieutenant colonel) on 10 May 1742.

During the War of Austrian Succession he served on the staff of Field Marshal George Wade at Dettingen in June 1743 and on the staff of the Duke of Cumberland at the Fontenoy in May 1745. Appointed colonel of the 48th Foot on 6 April 1746, he took part in Culloden later that month during the Jacobite Rebellion. His next battle, in July 1747, was at Lauffeld, in which he narrowly escaped death, being captured by the French but released on parole a few days later. In July 1749, he transferred from the 48th Foot to the 34th Foot, and served with his regiment in the garrison of Menorca in 1751.

== Early political career ==
Conway was elected unopposed to the Irish House of Commons in 1741 for County Antrim, and to the British Parliament for Higham Ferrers in December 1741 on the recommendation of Sir Robert Walpole. He was elected in 1747 for Penryn and for St Mawes in 1754, both in the Boscawen interest. He was promoted to major-general on 12 March 1755.

In April 1755, he was unexpectedly appointed Chief Secretary for Ireland by William Cavendish, Marquess of Hartington, the new Lord Lieutenant. He then finally took his seat for County Antrim in the Irish House of Commons in October 1755. It was hoped that he would resolve the conflict in Irish politics between the Speaker, Henry Boyle on the one side and George Stone, Archbishop of Armagh and John Ponsonby: ultimately, he reached a compromise, acceptable to the British Ministry, in which Boyle was bought off with an earldom and John Ponsonby became Speaker. He became a Groom of the Bedchamber in April 1757 to both George II and George III (until 1764).

== Seven Years' War ==
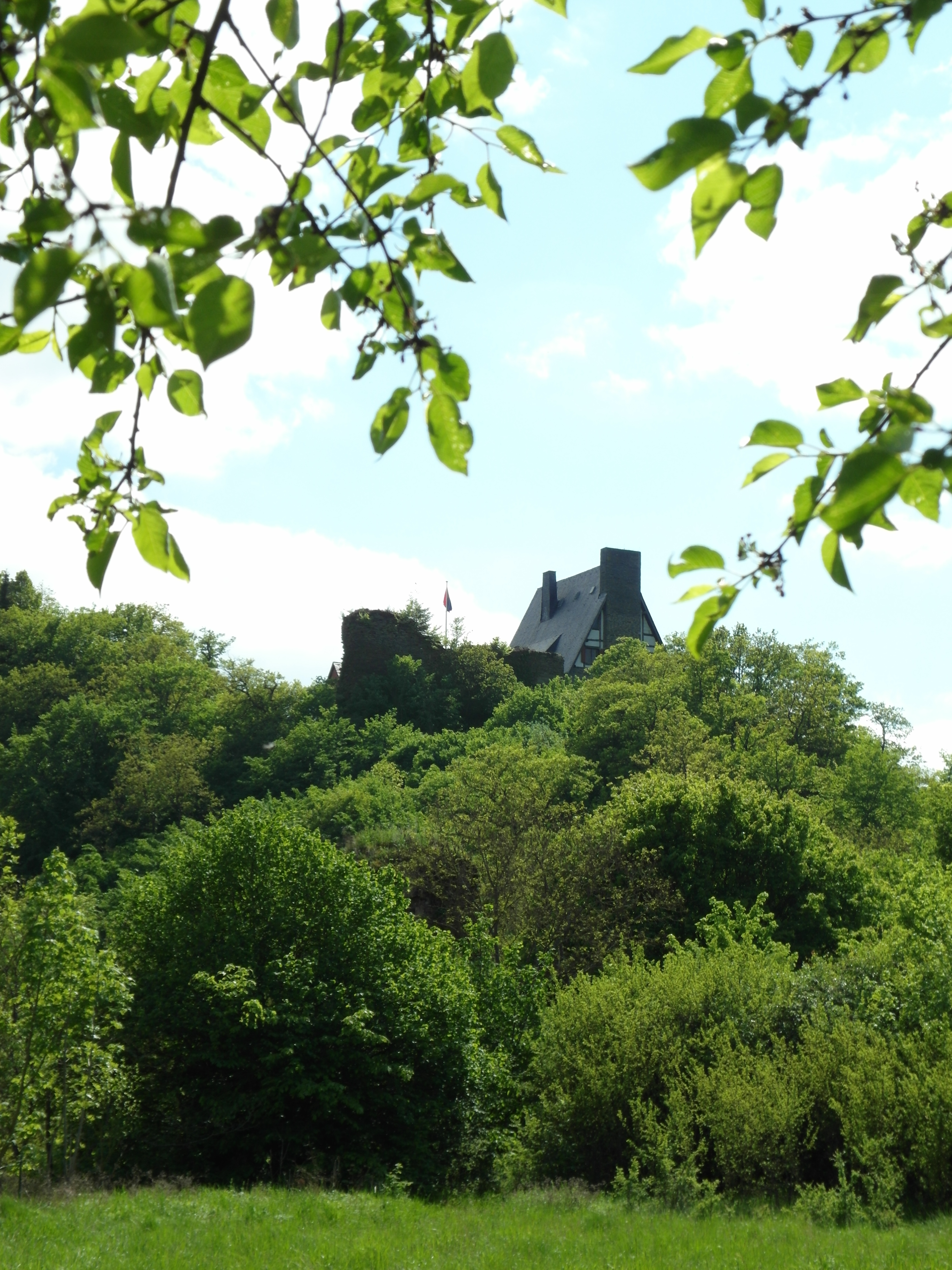
Waldeck Castle, captured by Conway in 1762 during the Seven Years' War

Conway was the British military second in command on the Rochefort expedition in 1757, and repeatedly advocated an attack on Fort Fouras, but his colleagues would only agree a night attack (which failed). Ultimately the expedition returned to Portsmouth having achieved nothing. Though Mordaunt (the commander in chief) was acquitted by his court-martial, the affair damaged both their reputations. In his displeasure, George II refused to employ Conway on the 1758 campaigns. He was not employed again until the next reign, except that he was sent to sign a cartel for an exchange of prisoners at Sluys in 1759. On 21 April 1759 he became colonel of the 1st The Royal Dragoons and on 25 August 1759 he was promoted to lieutenant general.

In 1761, he served in Germany as deputy to John Manners, Marquess of Granby, the British commander in the army led by Ferdinand of Brunswick. At the Battle of Villinghausen in July 1761 he commanded a corps which was at the centre of the line and not attacked. He was also present at the Battle of Wilhelmsthal in June 1762, and captured the castle of Waldeck the following month. After peace preliminaries were signed at Fontainebleau in November, he supervised the embarkation of British troops from Europe, returning to England in March.

== Later political career ==
Conway was re-elected to the House of Commons in April 1761, this time for Thetford and on 4 July 1761 he became a member of the Privy Council. having been previously appointed as a member of the Privy Council of Ireland in 1755. As a senior member of the Rockingham faction of the Whigs, he opposed the King's legal actions against the reformist John Wilkes in 1763 which resulted in his dismissal in 1764 as a Groom of the Bedchamber and as Colonel of the 1st Royal Dragoons. This led to the publication of accusation and counter-accusation in pamphlets, as it was feared that the government intended to purge the army of its political opponents.

He entered office with Lord Rockingham as Secretary of State for the Southern Department in July 1765 before switching to the Northern Department in May 1766, serving until January 1768, when he became a Minister without Portfolio. In these offices, Conway sought to urge a moderate policy towards the American colonies, being the principal supporter of the repeal of the Stamp Act, and opposing the taxation policies of Chancellor of the Exchequer Charles Townshend.

== Return to the Army ==
Following his resignation in January 1768, Conway returned to the military, and was made a full general on 26 May 1772 and Governor of Jersey on 22 October 1772. He remained an important figure in the Commons, opposing the British attempt to suppress the American Revolt. He was rewarded with a cabinet position and the office of Commander-in-Chief of the Forces in the new Rockingham ministry in March 1782. His political career came to an end in 1784 when he lost his seat in parliament due to his opposition to the new government of William Pitt and he focused thereafter on his military responsibilities retaining his post as Commander-in Chief until his complete retirement in January 1793. He was promoted to field marshal on 18 October 1793 and died, at his home, Park Place at Remenham in Berkshire, on 9 July 1795.

== Family ==
On 19 December 1747 he married Caroline, the widow of Charles Bruce, 4th Earl of Elgin and 3rd Earl of Ailesbury, and daughter of Lieutenant-General John Campbell, later the 4th Duke of Argyll. They had one daughter, the sculptor Anne Seymour Damer.

== See also ==
- Conway's Bridge at Park Place

== Sources ==
- Heathcote, Tony (1999). The British Field Marshals 1733–1997. Pen & Sword Ltd. ISBN 0-85052-696-5.

Parliament of Great Britain
Preceded by Henry Finch	Member of Parliament for Higham Ferrers; 1741–1747	Succeeded by John Hill
Preceded by John Evelyn; George Boscawen	Member of Parliament for Penryn; 1747–1754; With: George Boscawen	Succeeded by Hon. Richard Edgcumbe; George Boscawen
Preceded by Robert Nugent; Sir Thomas Clavering, Bt	Member of Parliament for St Mawes; 1754–1761; With: Robert Nugent 1754; James Newsham 1754–1761	Succeeded by Edmund Nugent; Richard Hussey
Preceded by Lord Henry Beauclerk; Herbert Westfaling	Member of Parliament for Thetford; 1761–1774; With: Hon. Aubrey Beauclerk 1761–1768; John Drummond 1768–1774; Viscount Petersham 1774	Succeeded by Hon. Charles FitzRoy; Charles FitzRoy-Scudamore
Preceded by Hon. Augustus Hervey; Sir Charles Davers, Bt	Member of Parliament for Bury St Edmunds; 1775–1784; With: Sir Charles Davers, Bt	Succeeded by Hon. George FitzRoy; Sir Charles Davers, Bt
Parliament of Ireland
Preceded by John Skeffington; John Upton	Member of Parliament for County Antrim; 1741–1768; With: Arthur Skeffington 1741–1747; Hugh Skeffington 1747–1768	Succeeded by Viscount Dunluce; Viscount Beauchamp
Political offices
Preceded by The Lord George Sackville	Chief Secretary for Ireland; 1755–1757	Succeeded by Richard Rigby
Preceded by The Earl of Halifax	Secretary of State for the Southern Department; 1765–1766	Succeeded by The Duke of Richmond
Preceded by George Grenville	Leader of the House of Commons; 1765–1768	Succeeded by Lord North
Preceded by The Duke of Grafton	Secretary of State for the Northern Department; 1766–1768	Succeeded by The Viscount Weymouth
Legal offices
Preceded by Sir Compton Domvile, Bt	Clerk of the Crown and Hanaper; 1768–1788	Succeeded by Sir Lucius O'Brien, Bt
Military offices
Preceded by Francis Ligonier	Colonel of the 48th Regiment of Foot; 1746–1749	Succeeded by The Viscount Torrington
Preceded by Hon. James Cholmondeley	Colonel of the 34th Regiment of Foot; 1749–1751	Succeeded by Charles Russell
Preceded by Sir Charles Armand Powlett	Colonel of the 13th Regiment of Dragoons; 1751–1754	Succeeded by John Mostyn
Preceded by Henry de Grangues	Colonel of the 4th (Irish) Regiment of Horse; 1754–1759	Succeeded by Philip Honywood
Preceded by Henry Hawley	Colonel of the 1st (Royal) Regiment of Dragoons; 1759–1764	Succeeded by The Earl of Pembroke
Preceded by The Viscount Townshend	Lieutenant-General of the Ordnance; 1767–1772	Succeeded by Jeffrey Amherst
Preceded by Sir Robert Rich, Bt	Colonel of the 4th Regiment of Dragoons; 1768–1770	Succeeded by Benjamin Carpenter
Preceded by Marquess of Granby	Colonel of the Royal Regiment of Horse Guards; 1770–1795	Succeeded by The Duke of Richmond
Preceded by The Earl of Albemarle	Governor of Jersey; 1772–1795	Succeeded by Sir George Howard
Preceded by The Lord Amherst	Commander-in-Chief of the Forces; 1782–1793	Succeeded by The Lord Amherst
