= William Fraser, of Fraserfield =

Scottish Jacobite politician

Hon. William Fraser, of Fraserfield (19 November 1691 – 23 March 1727) was a Scottish Jacobite politician.

He was the second of the two sons of William Fraser, 12th Lord Saltoun (1654–1715) and his wife Margaret (died 1734), daughter of James Sharp, the Archbishop of St Andrews who was murdered by Scottish Covenanters in 1679. Fraser was admitted as an advocate in 1713, and in 1724 he married Lady Katherine Anne Erskine, daughter of the 9th Earl of Buchan. They had one son, William Fraser (1725–1788).

Fraser took part in the Jacobite rising of 1715, but was later pardoned. In 1721 he bought the estate of Balgownie (near Aberdeen) from Lord Gray, and called it Fraserfield.

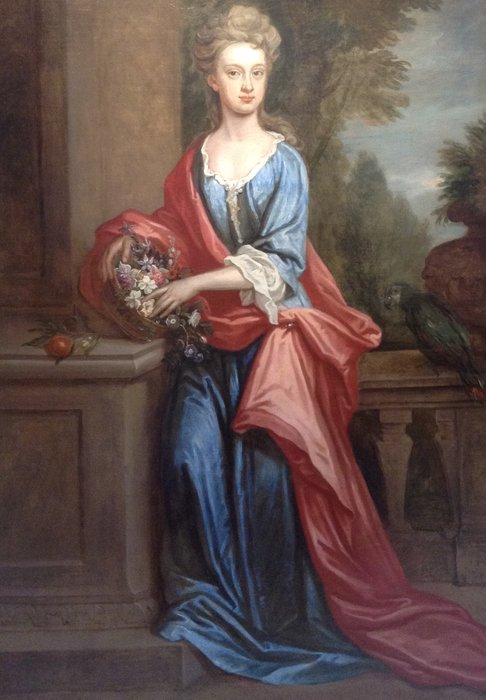
Lady Katherine Anne Erskine (1697-1733), portrait by John Baptist de Medina

At the 1722 general election, Fraser was elected as the Member of Parliament (MP) for Elgin Burghs. However, this was the second successive election in which two rival delegates had claimed to represent one of the burghs, and both votes had been counted. In 1715, the election petition was promptly resolved against the returned Jacobite James Murray, and the pro-government John Campbell seated in his place. When the House of Commons debated Campbell's petition against Fraser in October 1722, it was expected to similarly oust the Jacobite. However, Fraser's maiden speech was so effective that he won enough support for Campbell's allies not to press the motion. Instead, the petition was referred to the elections committee, who in January 1725 gave the seat to Campbell.

In April that year Fraser unsuccessfully contested the by-election in Linlithgow Burghs following the death of Daniel Weir. His petition against the result was rejected.

Parliament of Great Britain
Preceded by John Campbell	Member of Parliament for Elgin Burghs; 1722–1725	Succeeded by John Campbell
