= Charles Lennox, 3rd Duke of Richmond =

British politician and military officer (1735–1806)

Field Marshal His Grace The Duke of Richmond KG PC FRS
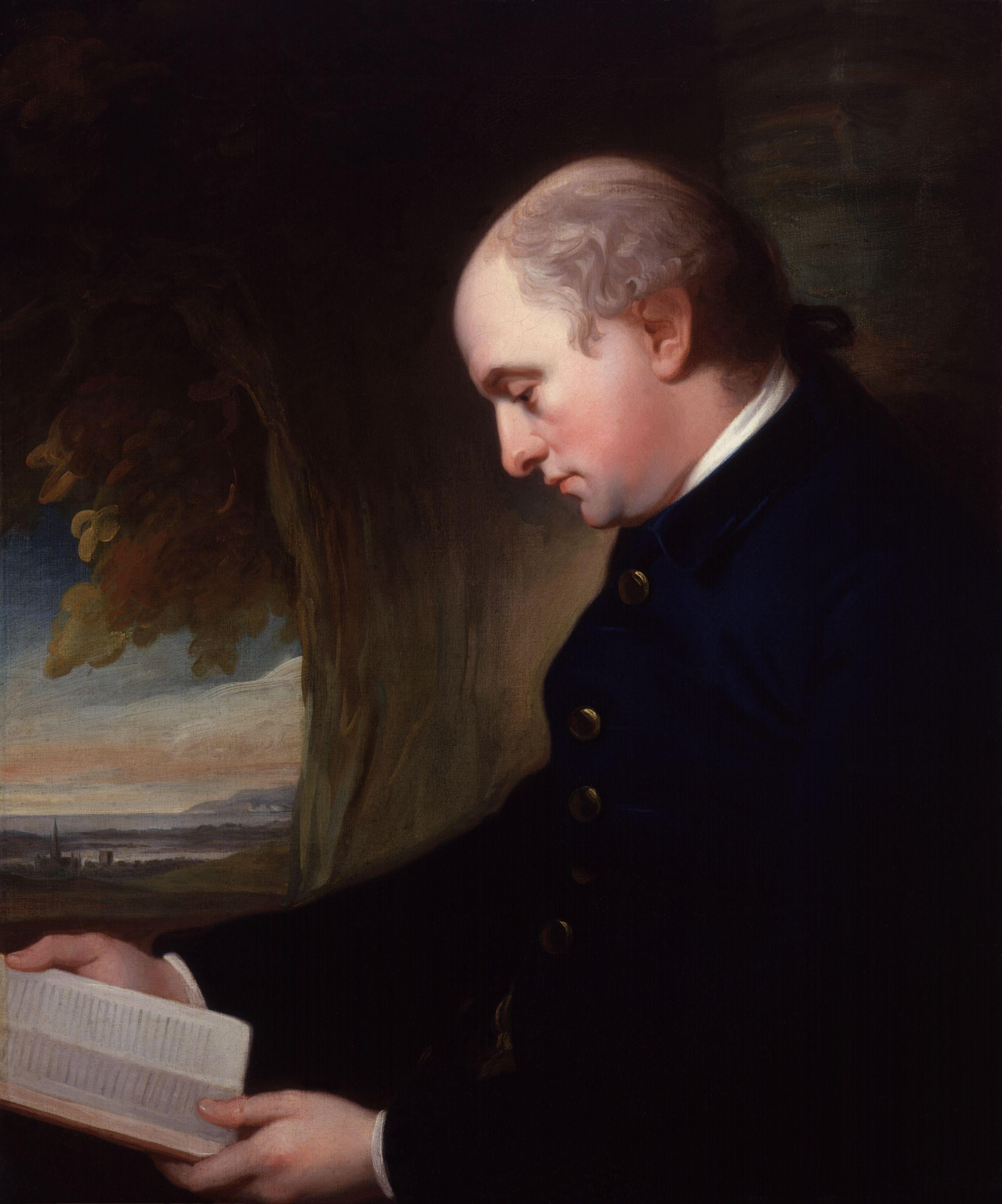
- Portrait by George Romney, c. 1777

Secretary of State for the Southern Department
- In office 23 May 1766 – 29 July 1766
- Monarch: George III
- Prime Minister: The Marquess of Rockingham
- Preceded by: Henry Seymour Conway
- Succeeded by: The Earl of Shelburne

Personal details
- Born: 22 February 1735 Westminster, London
- Died: 29 December 1806 (aged 71) Goodwood, Sussex
- Resting place: Chichester Cathedral
- Spouse: Lady Mary Bruce
- Parent(s): Charles Lennox, 2nd Duke of Richmond and Lennox; Lady Sarah Cadogan
- Awards: Knight of the Garter

Military service
- Allegiance: Great Britain; United Kingdom
- Branch/service: British Army; British Militia
- Years of service: 1752–1806
- Rank: Field Marshal
- Unit: 2nd Regiment of Foot Guards; 33rd Regiment of Foot
- Commands: 72nd Regiment of Foot; Sussex Militia
- Battles/wars: Seven Years' War; Raid on Cherbourg; Battle of Minden

Field Marshal Charles Lennox, 3rd Duke of Richmond, KG, PC, FRS (22 February 1735 – 29 December 1806), styled Earl of March until 1750, was a British politician and military officer. Associated with the Rockingham Whigs, Richmond briefly served as Secretary of State for the Southern Department in 1766. His support for the Patriots during the American War of Independence along with concession in Ireland and parliamentary reform in Britain led Richmond to be nicknamed "the Radical Duke". He is believed by many to be the source of the second parchment copy of the United States Declaration of Independence, known as the Sussex Declaration. Richmond went on to be a reforming Master-General of the Ordnance first in the second Rockingham ministry and then in the first Pitt ministry.

== Early life ==
He was the eldest surviving son and heir of Charles Lennox, 2nd Duke of Richmond and Lennox by his wife Lady Sarah Cadogan, elder daughter and co-heiress of William Cadogan, 1st Earl Cadogan. Known as the Earl of March or just "March" until 1750, he was educated at the elite Westminster School from age 7, the first in his family to be sent away to school rather than privately tutored at home. At school, the future Duke was a serious but undistinguished student, but importantly there he was a schoolmate of other future leaders of Britain. During his early time at Westminster School, Britain was involved in the War of the Austrian Succession in which March's father served in battle with George II. March's father led forces to defend the House of Hanover against the 1745 Jacobite rising led by Bonnie Prince Charlie, who was attempting to restore the House of Stuart. One of March's more senior classmates at Westminster, Charles Watson-Wentworth, later the 2nd Marquess of Rockingham and future prime minister under George III, left Westminster School to fight the Jacobites, returning afterwards. March attended Leiden University for about six months in 1753. He succeeded to the dukedom and other family titles in August 1750 when his father died.

== Career ==
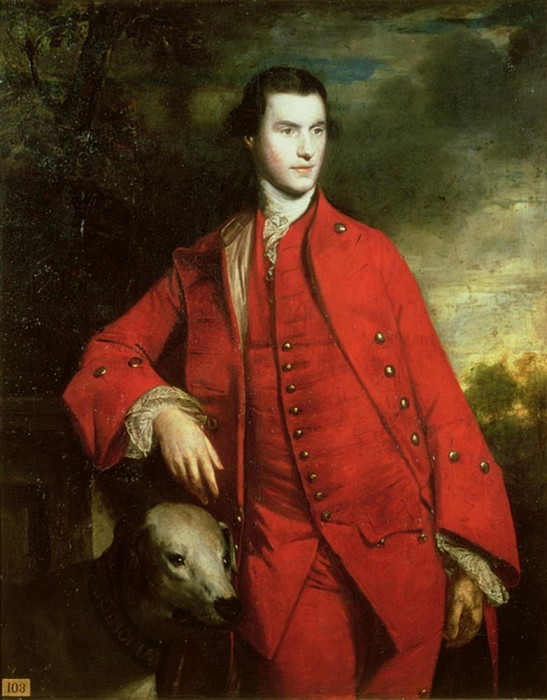
1758 portrait of Richmond by Sir Joshua Reynolds

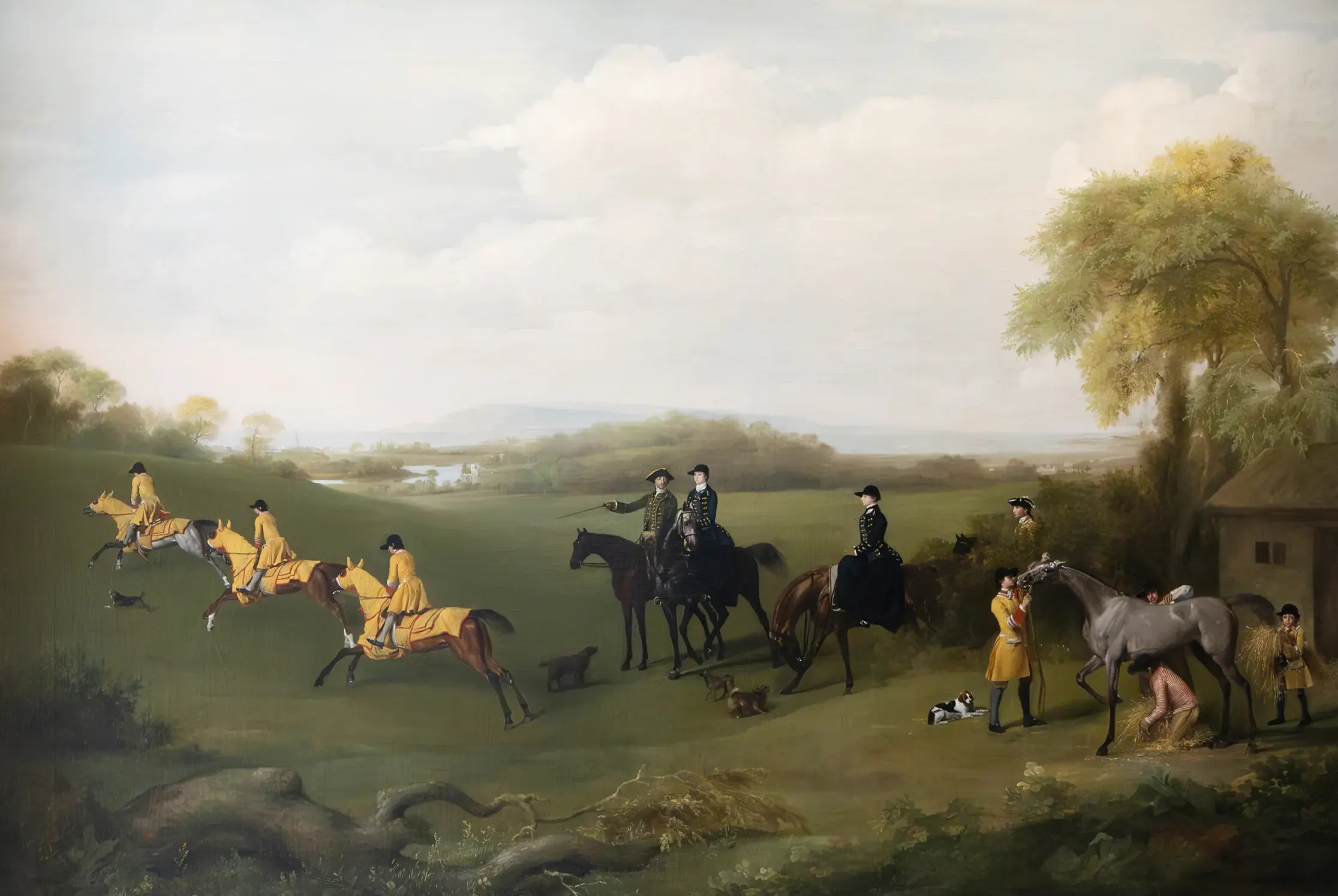
1759 painting of jockeys and grooms sporting Richmond's livery

Commissioned as an ensign in the British Army's 2nd Regiment of Foot Guards in March 1752, he was promoted to captain in the 20th Regiment of Foot on 18 June 1753 studying the fortified towns of the Low Countries under his military tutor, Captain Guy Carleton, appointed on the recommendation of Colonel James Wolfe. On 11 December 1755, he was elected a Fellow of the Royal Society.

Promoted to lieutenant colonel in the 33rd Regiment of Foot on 7 June 1756, a second battalion of the 33rd Foot was raised in 1757 and redesignated the following year as its own regiment, the 72nd Regiment of Foot, with Richmond as its commanding officer, while his younger brother Lord George Lennox took command of the 33rd Foot. In May 1758 he was appointed colonel of the 72nd Foot. Richmond took part in the raid on Cherbourg in August 1758 and served as aide-de-camp to Duke Ferdinand of Brunswick-Wolfenbüttel at the Battle of Minden in August 1759. Promoted to major general on 9 March 1761, at the end of the Seven Years' War he oversaw the 72nd Foot's disbandment in 1763.

Appointed Lord Lieutenant of Sussex by George III on 18 October 1763, Richmond was sworn of the Privy Council in 1765 being posted to the court of Louis XV in Paris as British ambassador extraordinary, and in the following year he served briefly in the Rockingham Whig administration as Southern Secretary of State, resigning office on the accession of Pitt the Elder in July 1766. He was promoted Lieutenant-General on 30 April 1770 and served briefly as parliamentary Leader of the Whigs in Opposition in 1771 when Rockingham's wife was ill. Richmond's strongly pro-Patriot sympathies earned him the epithet "the Radical Duke."

In policy debates leading up to the American War of Independence, Richmond was a firm supporter of the Patriots, initiating the parliamentary debate in 1778 which called for the removal of British forces from the Thirteen Colonies, during which Pitt (now Earl of Chatham) died from a heart condition. Nevertheless, as Lord-Lieutenant, he raised the Sussex Militia for home defence, taking personal command as Colonel of the Regiment until 1804, resigning in view of his advanced age.

Richmond also advocated a policy of concession in regards to British policy towards Ireland, coining the phrase "a Union of Hearts" which remained in use long after his political lifetime. In 1779 Richmond brought forward a motion for retrenchment of the Civil List, and in 1780 he embodied in a Bill proposals for parliamentary reform, which included male suffrage, annual parliaments and equal electoral areas. In 1787, he was elected a member of the American Philosophical Society. Richmond joined the Second Rockingham ministry as Master-General of the Ordnance in March 1782; he was appointed a Knight of the Garter on 17 April 1782 and promoted to general on 20 November 1782. He resigned as Master-General of the Ordnance when the Fox–North coalition came to power in April 1783.

In January 1784 he joined the first Pitt ministry, again serving as Master-General of the Ordnance; in this role he reformed the Department of State, introducing salaries for office holders, establishing a survey of the South Coast (which led to the formation of the Ordnance Survey) and introducing new artillery (leading to the formation of the Royal Horse Artillery). As Master-General of the Ordnance, Richmond's operational headquarters was at the Royal Arsenal in Woolwich, where he oversaw the Royal Military Repository (established 1778) under its first Commandant, Sir William Congreve. Richmond supervised Congreve's development of the Repository's artillery collection and his gunpowder experiments at the Royal Laboratory, including improvements in powder manufacture and the establishment of facilities at Portsmouth and Plymouth for powder recovery.

In 1794, Richmond formally established the Corps of Royal Artillery Drivers by Royal Warrant to provide professional teams for field artillery, complementing his earlier formation of the Royal Horse Artillery and ending the reliance on civilian contractors for moving guns. He further commissioned London gunsmith Henry Nock to design and manufacture a new "Duke of Richmond's musket" to replace the Brown Bess musket. The first practical example of using interchangeable parts, just as Nock succeeded in producing the weapon at scale Richmond lost his post as Master-General, ending the prospect of the weapon being adopted officially. However, similar designs continued to be associated with the Duke. After conversion, the majority of these muskets were lost in the Tower of London fire of 1841, along with other ordnance stored there. Contemporary sources report that the fire destroyed over 280,000 small arms, which included numerous Nock screwless-lock "Duke of Richmond's musket" pattern.

By now developing strongly Tory persuasions, his alleged desertion of the Reform cause led to accusations of apostasy and an attack on him by Lord Lauderdale in 1792, which almost led to a duel. In November 1795, when Thomas Hardy and John Horne Tooke were charged with treason and cited his publications on reform in their defence, Richmond became perceived as a liability to HM Government and was dismissed in February 1795.

Appointed colonel of the Royal Horse Guards on 18 July 1795, he was promoted as Field Marshal on 30 July 1796. On 15 June 1797 he raised a troop-sized horse artillery unit of the Yeomanry Cavalry known as the Duke of Richmond's Light Horse Artillery at his estate of Goodwood House. The unit was equipped with his own design of a curricle gun carriage. In retirement, Richmond developed the family seat enhancing Goodwood's reputation as a sporting estate by adding, alongside his father's cricket pitch, the famous Goodwood Racecourse. He was also a patron of artists such as George Stubbs, Pompeo Batoni, Anton Raphael Mengs, Joshua Reynolds and George Romney.

== Personal life ==
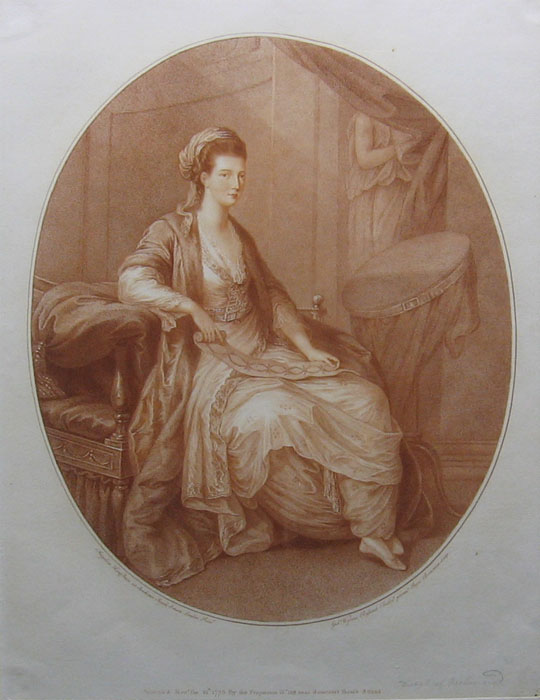
1775 stipple engraving of Mary by William Wynne Ryland after an Angelica Kauffman portrait

=== Marriage ===
On 1 April 1757, he married Lady Mary Bruce (died 1796), youngest daughter and co-heiress of Charles Bruce, 3rd Earl of Ailesbury, and his third wife, Lady Caroline Campbell. The wedding was held at the house of Major-General Henry Conway in Warwick Street, St James's, with the consent of the Major-General, one of Lady Mary's guardians, by special licence of the Dean and Chapter of Canterbury Cathedral, given the then vacancy of the See of Canterbury, and performed by the Hon. and Revd Frederick Keppel, then Canon of Windsor and the future Bishop of Exeter. The couple had no children, so that on his death, his brother George's son Charles inherited the titles.

=== Mistresses and acknowledged offspring ===
Richmond had extramarital relationships, producing children he acknowledged in his will.

- Vicomtesse de Cambis

During the time he was married, the Duke had a liaison with French aristocrat Gabrielle-Charlotte-Françoise d'Alsace de Hénin-Liétard (Vicomtesse de Cambis; died 1809), wife of General Jacques-François de Cambis (1727–1792), seigneur d'Orsan, niece of Cardinal d'Alsace and sister of the Prince de Chimay.

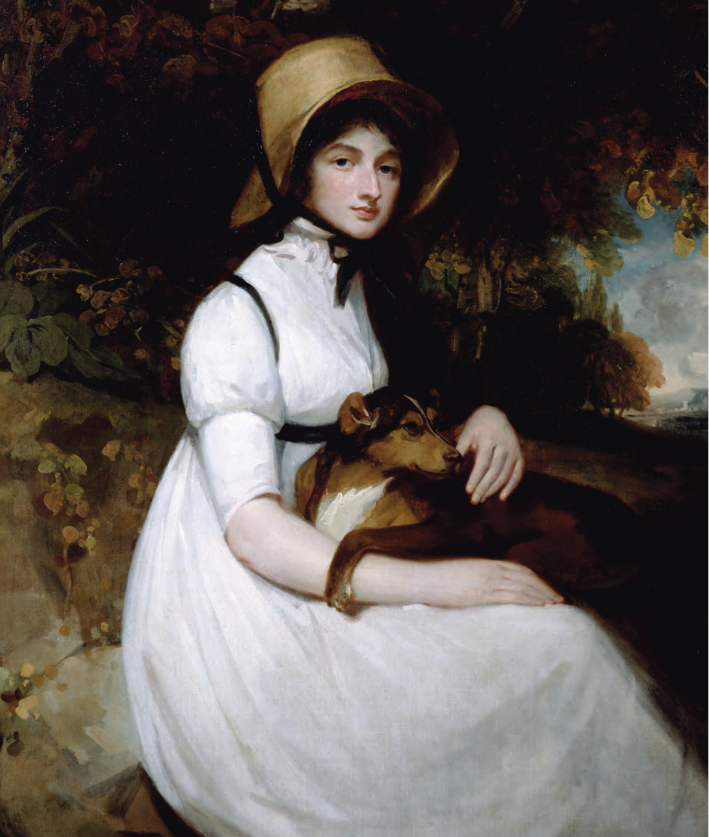
1796 portrait of Henrietta by George Romney

  - Henrietta Anne le Clerc (1773–1846), grew up in the household of the Duke and was variously called "a protégée of the Duchess" and "a long acknowledged daughter of His Grace". The Duke referred to her in his Will as "Miss Henrietta Anne le Clerc, who resides with me and though Christened by the name of Anne only, is called Henrietta and whom I have [educated?] from her childhood". He bequeathed her an annual income of £2,000. In 1778, aged 5, Henrietta had been brought from France by the Duke's sister Lady Louisa Conolly, to live at Goodwood House. It was in Henrietta's bedroom at Richmond House where the fire started in 1791 which destroyed that building. By the Duke's will she received the life tenure of West Lavant Park and other lands and farms on the Goodwood Estate. On 28 March 1808, at St James's Church, Westminster, she married Lieutenant-General John Dorrien (1758–1825), late Royal Horse Guards, by whom she had a son, Charles Dorrien. After her husband's death she turned to the management of her estate, where she bred Merino sheep as well as hunting with Colonel Wyndham's foxhounds.
- Mrs Mary Bennett

After the Duke was widowed in 1796, the Duke had a relationship with a woman described as his housekeeper. With her he had three daughters, acknowledged in his will: Elizabeth, Caroline and Mary. Their mother, Mrs Mary Bennett (1765–1845), also known at some point as Mrs Mary Blesard, 30 years his junior. To his daughters from this relationship, he bequeathed the sum of £10,000 each, and to Mrs Bennett he bequeathed his estate at Earl's Court, Kensington.

  - Mary Bennett, who at the age of 19 married Colonel William Light (1786–1839), founder of the City of Adelaide in Australia.
  - Caroline Bennett (9 August 1806 – 5 September 1836), who married her first cousin Captain Henry Edward Napier, son of Colonel the Hon. George Napier and Lady Sarah Lennox, sister of the 3rd Duke. Captain Napier was the author of Florentine History from the earliest Authentic Records to the Accession of Ferdinand the Third, Grandduke of Tuscany, and a brother of General Sir Charles James Napier, conqueror of the Sindh. She died at the Villa Capponi in Florence and her inscribed gravestone survives in the "English Cemetery" or Cimitero di Pinti at Florence, next to that of her mother.

== Death, burial and succession ==
The 3rd Duke died at Goodwood on 29 December 1806 and was buried in Chichester Cathedral, Sussex. As he left no legitimate children, he was succeeded in his peerage titles by his nephew, Charles Lennox, 4th Duke of Richmond and Lennox.

== The Sussex Declaration ==
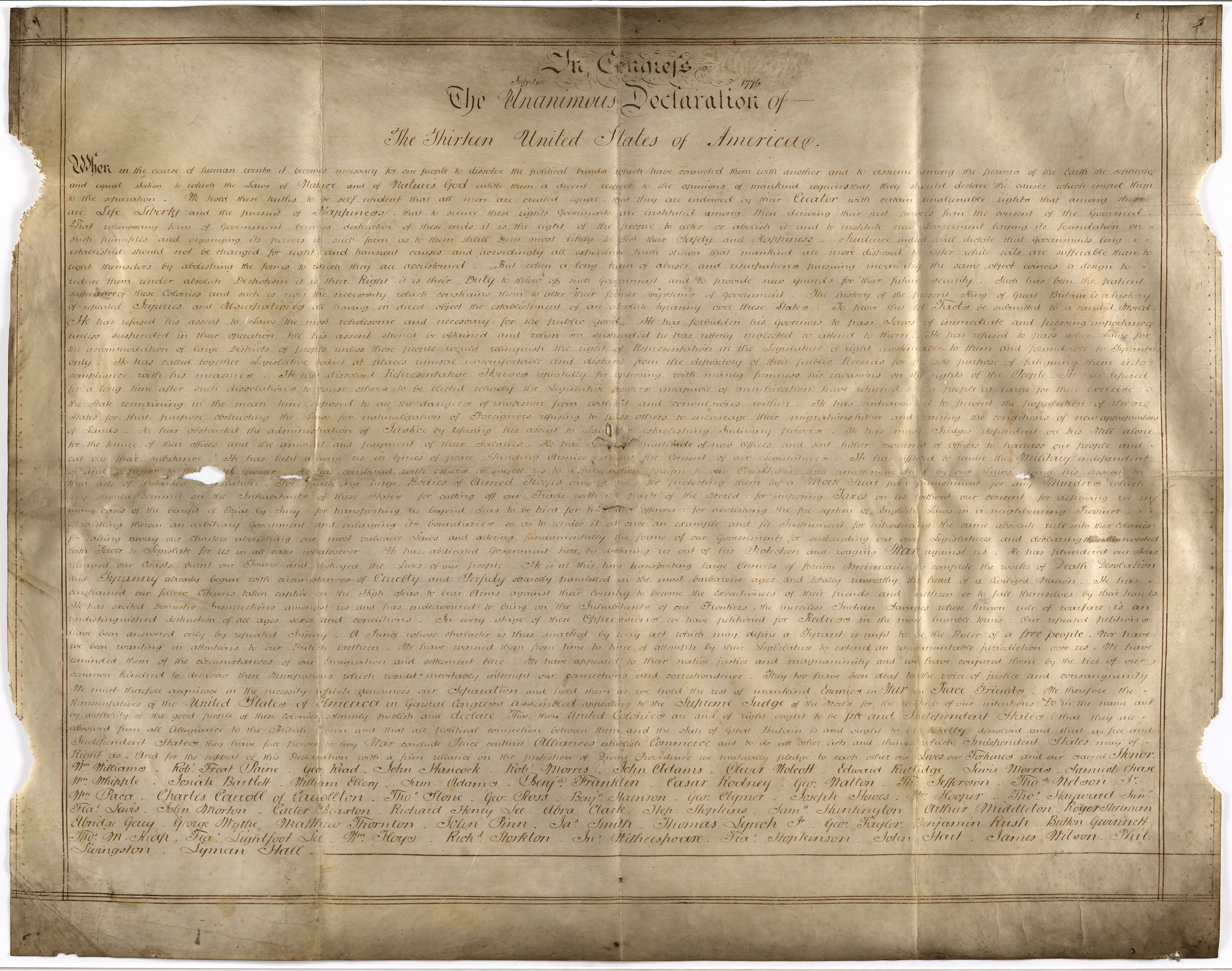
The Sussex Declaration at Chichester archives

On 21 April 2017 the Harvard Declaration Resources Project announced the discovery at West Sussex Record Office in Chichester, England, of a second parchment manuscript copy of the United States Declaration of Independence. Named the "Sussex Declaration" by historians Danielle Allen and Emily Sneff, it differs from the National Archives version (which the finders refer to as the "Matlack Declaration") in that the signatures on it are not grouped by States. How this manuscript arrived in England is as yet unknown, but the finders believe that the randomness of the signatures points to an origin with signatory James Wilson, who had argued strongly that the Declaration was made not by the States but by the whole people. The Sussex Declaration is thought probably to have been brought back to England by the Duke of Richmond.

However, in 2025 Professor Allen, after continued research, wrote of her conviction that the Sussex Declaration was brought from Philadelphia to Lewes, Sussex not by the Duke of Richmond, but by Thomas Paine, on a brief return visit home in 1787, as a gift to the duke, his longtime patron and friend.

== Memorials ==
Both Richmond County, North Carolina and Richmond County, Georgia are named in the 3rd Duke's memory.

== Arms ==
Coat of arms of Charles Lennox, 3rd Duke of Richmond
Coronet That of a Duke Crest On a Chapeau Gules turned up Ermine a Lion statant guardant Or crowned with a Ducal Coronet Gules and gorged with a Collar compony of four pieces Argent and Gules charged with two Roses of the Last; (Richmond crest with Lennox collar and coronet). Escutcheon The Royal Arms of King Charles II of England (viz. grand-quarterly: 1st and 4th, France and England quarterly; 2nd, Scotland; 3rd, Ireland); the whole within a Bordure compony Argent charged with Roses Gules barbed and seeded Proper and the Last; in pretence, an Inescutcheon Gules charged with three Buckles Or (for Aubigny). Supporters Dexter: A Unicorn Argent armed, crined and unguled Or, gorged with a Collar compony; Sinister: An Antelope Argent, also armed, crined and unguled Or, gorged with a Collar compony (as in the Crest). Motto En la rose Je fleuris (French: "Like the rose, I flourish") Orders Surrounding the Shield, the Garter circlet: Honi soit qui mal y pense (Shame be to him who thinks evil of it)

== Sources ==
- Allen, Danielle. Radical Duke: How One Aristocrat -- and the American Revolution -- Transformed Britain. Liveright Publishers 2026. ISBN 978-1631497551
- Brereton, J. M.; Savoury, A. C. S. (1993). History of the Duke of Wellington's Regiment. Duke of Wellington's Regiment. ISBN 978-0952155201.
- Heathcote, Tony (1999). The British Field Marshals, 1736–1997: A Biographical Dictionary. Barnsley: Leo Cooper. ISBN 0-85052-696-5.
- L. Barlow & R. J. Smith, The Uniforms of the British Yeomanry Force 1794–1914, 1: The Sussex Yeomanry Cavalry, London: Robert Ogilby Trust/Tunbridge Wells: Midas Books, ca 1979, ISBN 0-85936-183-7.
- Col George Jackson Hay, An Epitomized History of the Militia (The Constitutional Force), London:United Service Gazette, 1905.
- J. R. Western, The English Militia in the Eighteenth Century: The Story of a Political Issue 1660–1802, London: Routledge & Kegan Paul, 1965.

Military offices
New regiment	Colonel of the 72nd Regiment of Foot; 1758–1763	Regiment disbanded
Preceded by The Viscount Townshend	Master-General of the Ordnance; 1782–1783	Succeeded by The Viscount Townshend
Preceded by The Viscount Townshend	Master-General of the Ordnance; 1784–1795	Succeeded by The Marquess Cornwallis
Preceded by Rt Hon. Henry Seymour Conway	Colonel of the Royal Regiment of Horse Guards; 1795–1806	Succeeded by The Duke of Northumberland
Diplomatic posts
Preceded by The Earl of Hertford	HM Ambassador to the Kingdom of France; 1765–1766	Succeeded by The Earl of Rochford
Political offices
Preceded by Rt Hon. Henry Seymour Conway	Secretary of State for the Southern Department; 1766	Succeeded by The Earl of Shelburne
Honorary titles
Preceded by The Earl of Egremont	Lord Lieutenant of Sussex; 1763–1806	Succeeded by The Duke of Norfolk
Peerage of England
Preceded by Charles Lennox (2nd Duke)	Duke of Richmond; 3rd creation 1750–1806	Succeeded by Charles Lennox (4th Duke)
Peerage of Scotland
Preceded by Charles Lennox (2nd Duke)	Duke of Lennox; 2nd creation 1750–1806	Succeeded by Charles Lennox (4th Duke)
French nobility
Preceded by Charles Lennox (2nd Duke)	Duke of Aubigny; 1777–1806	Succeeded by Charles Lennox (4th Duke)
