= John Campbell, 4th Duke of Argyll =

British Army officer and politician (1693–1770)

General His Grace The Duke of Argyll KT PC
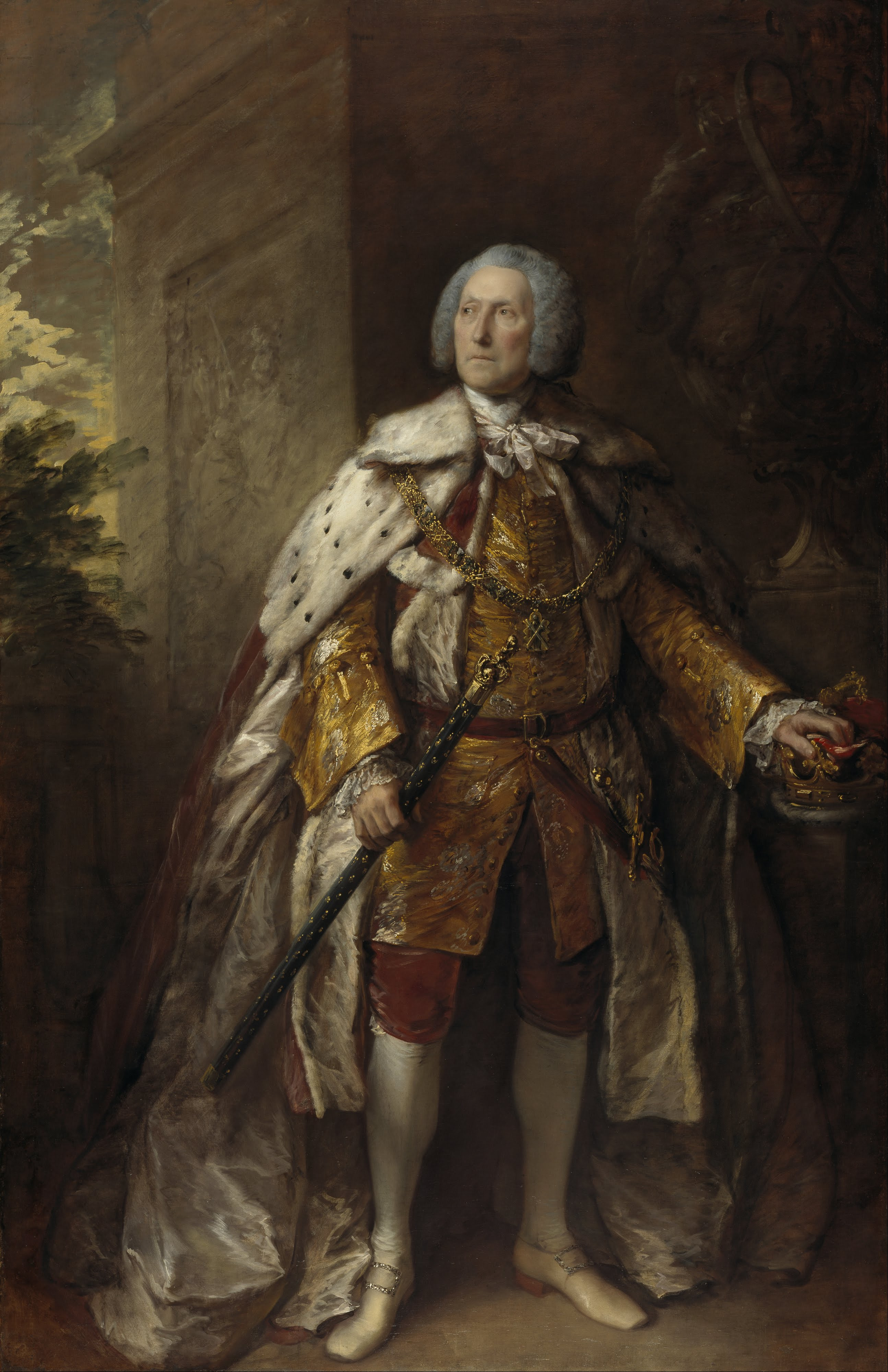
- Portrait by Thomas Gainsborough, 1767

Member of Parliament
- In office 1713–1761
- Constituency: Buteshire (1713–1715); Elgin Burghs (1715–1722); Elgin Burghs (1725–1727); Dunbartonshire (1727–1761)

Personal details
- Born: c. 1693 Scotland
- Died: 9 November 1770 (aged 76–77) Great Britain
- Resting place: Kilmun Parish Church, Argyll and Bute
- Party: Whig
- Spouse: Mary Bellenden (m. 1720; died 1736)
- Children: John, Frederick, William, and 1 daughter
- Parent: John Campbell

Military service
- Allegiance: Great Britain
- Branch/service: British Army
- Years of service: 1710–1770
- Rank: General
- Unit: John Campbell's Regiment of Foot; Royal North British Fusiliers; 2nd (Royal North British) Regiment of Dragoons
- Battles/wars: War of the Austrian Succession; Battle of Dettingen

General John Campbell, 4th Duke of Argyll, KT, PC (c. 1693 – 9 November 1770) was a Scottish British Army officer and Whig politician who represented Buteshire, Elgin Burghs, and Dunbartonshire in the House of Commons of Great Britain between 1713 and 1761.

== Early life ==
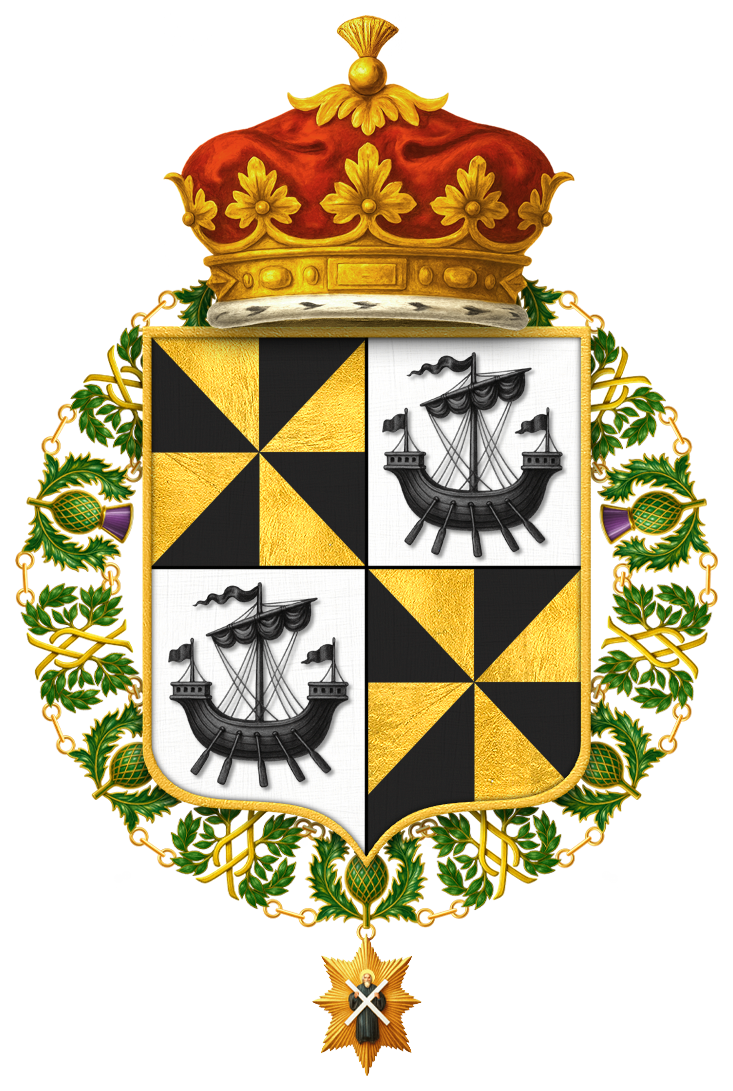
Shield of arms of John Campbell, 4th Duke of Argyll, 1st Duke of Greenwich, KG, KT

John Campbell was born c. 1693, the son of John Campbell of Mamore. His father was the second son of Archibald Campbell, 9th Earl of Argyll and his wife Elizabeth Elphinston, the daughter of John Elphinstone, 8th Lord Elphinstone.

== Marriage and children ==
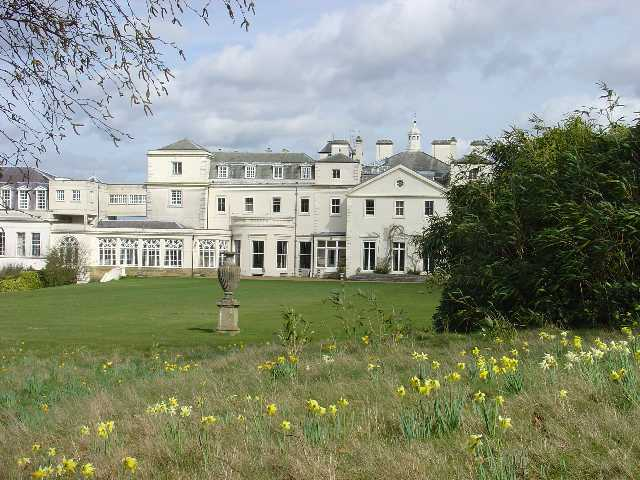
Coombe Bank

In 1720, Campbell secretly married Mary Drummond Bellenden, the daughter of John Drummond Bellenden, 2nd Lord Bellenden of Broughton. A maid of honour to Caroline of Ansbach, she was rumoured to have had an affair with the Prince of Wales. She had told the Prince that she would ask his blessing on any marriage but she broke this promise and married. She lost her position but John Campbell retained his position as a Groom of the Bedchamber. They moved to Coombe Bank. They had the following children:

- Caroline Campbell (born 12 January 1721, died 17 January 1803)
- Field Marshal John Campbell, 5th Duke of Argyll (born June 1723, died 24 May 1806)
- Lord Frederick Campbell (born 20 June 1729, died 8 June 1816)
- Lord William Campbell (born 11 July 1730, died 1778)

His wife died in childbirth in 1736.

He acquired Coombe Bank, at Sundridge, near Sevenoaks Kent, where he commissioned Roger Morris to build a country house for him in the second quarter of the 18th century. The house subsequently passed on his death in 1770 to his second son Frederick.

== Military and parliamentary careers ==
Campbell joined the British Army in 1710, becoming a lieutenant colonel at the age of 19. However, he soon entered the world of politics, and at the 1713 general election, he was returned unopposed as Member of Parliament (MP) for the alternating seat of Buteshire. At the 1715 general election, Campbell stood at Elgin Burghs. He was defeated in the poll, in which two rival delegates were allowed to vote, and the chairman, who was the other candidate, used his casting vote in the resulting tie to return himself. Campbell was returned on petition as MP for the Boroughs on 7 April 1715. In the 1722 general election, much the same thing happened again with two rival delegates casting their votes. This time the petition was referred to committee and it took two years before Campbell was returned as MP on 23 January 1725.

At the 1727 general election, Campbell succeeded his father as MP for Dunbartonshire, where he was returned unopposed in the general elections of 1734, 1741 and 1747. He was returned unopposed again for Dumbartonshire at the 1754 general election, and supported Newcastle's administration and voted in its defence in the division on Minorca in 1757. He was nominated for governor of Dumbarton castle in 1759 but became involved in the Argyll-Bute family quarrel and was appointed governor of Limerick in compensation. He was returned again at the 1761 general election, but succeeded to the Dukedom two days later and had to vacate his seat in the House of Commons. During most of his tenure as MP for Dunbartonshire, he was Groom of the Bedchamber.

Additionally, Campbell served in the military during his tenure in Parliament—he became Colonel of the 39th Regiment of Foot (1737–1738) and the 21st Regiment of Foot (1738–1752), serving with honour in the Battle of Dettingen in 1743. On 12 July 1746, Campbell was the interrogator of Flora MacDonald, a Jacobite who aided Charles Edward Stuart's escape to Skye, and produced a written document of MacDonald's confessions. He rose quickly up the ranks, becoming a brigadier general in 1743, major general in 1744, and lieutenant general in 1747; he became colonel of the Royal North British Dragoons in 1752, a position he held until his death.

== Dukedom and death ==
Upon inheriting the dukedom and other titles upon the death of his cousin Archibald Campbell, 3rd Duke of Argyll in 1761, he left the House of Commons and became governor of Limerick and a Scottish representative peer. He became a member of Privy Council in 1762, a general in 1765, and a Knight of the Order of the Thistle in that same year. The Duke died on 9 November 1770 and is buried at Kilmun Parish Church. He was succeeded in the dukedom and other titles by his elder son John. His younger son Lord William Campbell was the last British Governor of South Carolina.

== Ancestry ==
Ancestors of John Campbell, 4th Duke of Argyll

8. Archibald Campbell, 1st Marquess of Argyll
4. Archibald Campbell, 9th Earl of Argyll
9. Lady Margaret Douglas
2. The Hon. John Campbell
10. James Stuart, 4th Earl of Moray
5. Lady Mary Stuart
11. Lady Margaret Home
1. John Campbell, 4th Duke of Argyll
12. Alexander Elphinstone, 6th Lord Elphinstone
6. John Elphinstone, 8th Lord Elphinstone
13. The Hon. Lilias Elphinstone
3. The Hon. Elizabeth Elphinstone
14. Charles Maitland, 3rd Earl of Lauderdale
7. Lady Isabel Maitland
15. Elizabeth Lauder

== In popular culture ==
In The Black Adder, the first series of historical sitcom Blackadder, the second episode, Born to Be King, has Alex Norton playing the Fourth Duke of Argyll, but this Duke is not John Campbell since the episode is set in 1487, 206 years before Campbell was born, and the Fourth Duke is called Dougal MacAngus.

Parliament of Great Britain
Preceded by John Montgomerie (to 1710)	Member of Parliament for Buteshire; 1713–1715	Succeeded by Patrick Campbell (from 1722)
Preceded by James Murray	Member of Parliament for Elgin Burghs; 1715–1722	Succeeded by William Fraser
Preceded by William Fraser	Member of Parliament for Elgin Burghs; 1725–1727	Succeeded by William Steuart
Preceded by John Campbell	Member of Parliament for Dunbartonshire; 1727–1761	Succeeded by Sir Archibald Edmonstone
Military offices
Preceded by Thomas Wentworth	Colonel of John Campbell's Regiment of Foot; 1737–1738	Succeeded by Richard Onslow
Preceded by Sir James Wood	Colonel of the Royal North British Fusiliers; 1738–1752	Succeeded by The Earl Panmure
Preceded by The Earl of Rothes	Colonel of the 2nd (Royal North British) Regiment of Dragoons; 1752–1770	Succeeded by The Earl Panmure
Peerage of Scotland
Preceded by Archibald Campbell	Duke of Argyll; 1761–1770	Succeeded by John Campbell
