= Shiela Grant Duff =

British journalist (1913–2004)

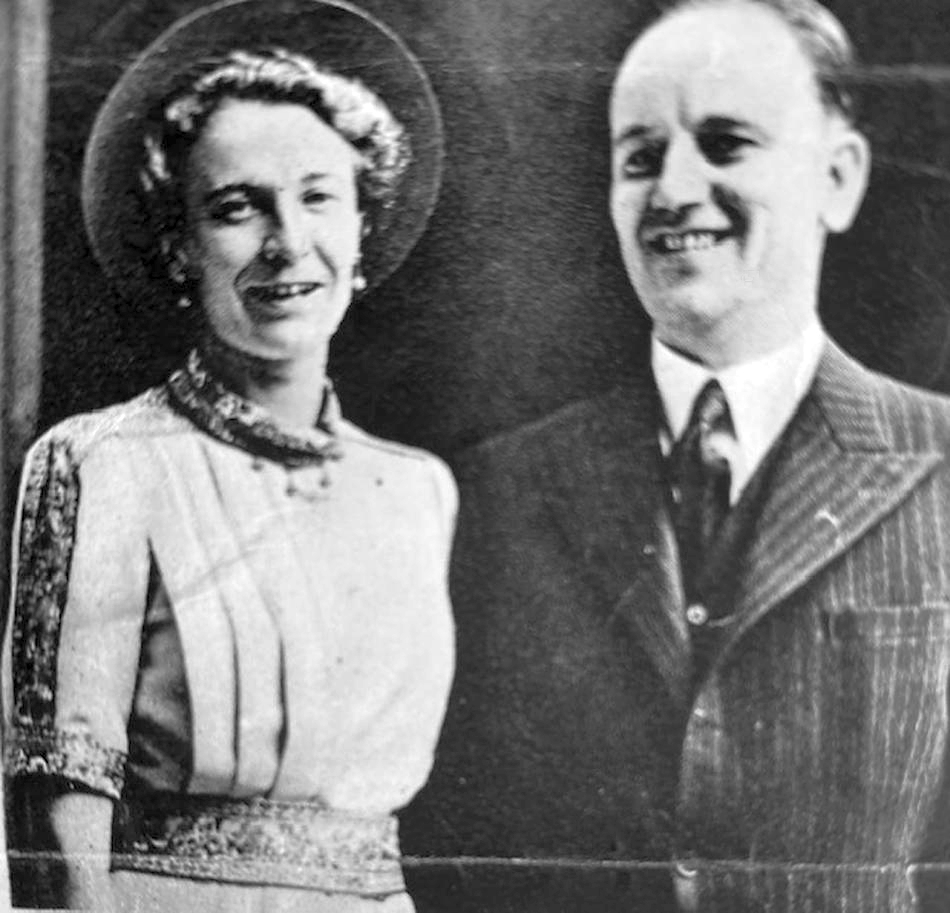
Duff and Newsome on their wedding day, 1942

Shiela Grant Duff (11 May 1913 – 19 March 2004) was a British author, journalist and foreign correspondent. She was known for her opposition to appeasement before the Second World War.

== Early years ==
The youngest daughter of Adrian Grant Duff and the Hon. Ursula Lubbock, Shiela Grant Duff was born in the Grosvenor Square home of her maternal grandfather, Sir John Lubbock. The youngest of four children, her paternal grandfather was Sir Mountstuart Elphinstone Grant Duff. Her father, who served as Army Secretary to the Cabinet from 1911 to 1913 (alongside First Lord of the Admiralty Winston Churchill), was later a commanding officer in the Royal Highland Regiment, and died leading his regiment's attack at the First Battle of the Aisne in 1914. The young Shiela Grant Duff grew up understanding that her father's central contribution, as creator of the British Government's War Book, to the successful prosecution of the First World War had been overlooked.

At the age of 12, she attended St Paul's Girls' School in London, where she befriended Diana Hubback and Peggy Garnett. Through Garnett she met Douglas Jay, who influenced her intellectual development. She went up to Lady Margaret Hall, Oxford in 1931, where she read Philosophy, Politics, and Economics and was tutored by R. G. Collingwood, John Fulton and Isaiah Berlin. Among the friends she made at Oxford were Berlin, Goronwy Rees, Christopher Cox, Herbert Hart and Ian Bowen; although her closest friendship was with Rees, she remains associated in historical literature with the later German Widerstand figure Adam von Trott zu Solz, then a Rhodes Scholar attending Balliol College who was romantically involved with her friend Diana Hubback.

== Career as author and journalist ==
Brought up by her mother to consider war as the greatest evil and appalled by the violence and brutality of the Nazi regime, Grant Duff committed herself to trying to prevent a future war. Acting upon the advice of Arnold J. Toynbee, she sought to discover the cause of war by becoming a foreign correspondent. Her application to The Times was turned down by editor Geoffrey Dawson who believed the job was unsuitable for a woman. Instead, Grant Duff moved to Paris, where she worked in Paris for a time under the Chicago Daily News Pulitzer Prize-winning journalist Edgar Ansel Mowrer. Mowrer had reported from Europe since 1917 before living inside Germany from 1924 and, having a long personal knowledge of the Nazi leadership, was forced out of Berlin in June 1933 shortly after Adolf Hitler assumed power. This leading American newspaper-man was of central importance to Grant Duff for disabusing her of the anti-Versailles Treaty assumptions she had learned at Oxford and from von Trott. Mowrer, who predicted World War II from 1933 and was labelled "a sworn and proven enemy" by the Nazi Press gave further urgency and impetus to Grant Duff, and can be credited for the increasing antagonism she developed against the complacency displayed by von Trott in his relationships to the leading "appeasers" of the 1930s.

In January 1935, she found employment as a correspondent on a freelance commission for The Observer covering the Saar plebiscite. During that month, her copy provided the newspaper's successive front-page coverage. During the 1935 general election, she worked as a secretary for Hugh Dalton, the Labour Party spokesperson for foreign affairs. Afterwards, she assisted Jawaharlal Nehru during his visit to England in 1936 and briefly considered following his example into the field of anti-colonialism, before deciding to concentrate on the necessities for the survival of "small-nations" in Europe.

In June 1936, Grant Duff moved to Prague to become the Czechoslovakia correspondent for The Observer. Growing increasingly perturbed by the expansionism of Nazi Germany, she soon established a friendship with Hubert Ripka, a journalist and confidant of Czechoslovak president Edvard Beneš, who further tutored her on Eastern European politics and introduced her to several leading Czech political figures. At Mowrer's request, she undertook a trip to Málaga in February 1937 to discover the fate of Arthur Koestler, who had been arrested by the Nationalists as a Republican spy.

By the spring of 1937, Grant Duff was increasingly at odds with The Observer's support for appeasement and their being viewed by many in Prague as being in the pay of the German government. After meeting Basil Newton, the British minister in Prague, she wrote she was feeling "terribly depressed by the cynical and uncaring attitude of my fellow countrymen" towards Czechoslovakia. In May she resigned from her position with the paper and undertook freelance assignments for other newspapers. At the behest of Ripka, Grant Duff also met with Winston Churchill (whose wife was a distant relation of hers), and served as a contact between the two men over the next two years.

Grant Duff's 1938 best-selling Penguin Special, Europe and the Czechs was delivered to British Parliamentarians the very day that British Prime Minister Neville Chamberlain returned from Munich having signed the agreement with Adolf Hitler that forced the secession of the Sudetenland to Germany. Its publication brought Grant Duff prominence, and identified her placement between supporters of appeasement and those "on the side of the Angels" or, as Churchill, "in the Wilderness".

Grant Duff could not have served von Trott as a contact point between Churchill and the German government, for von Trott had confided neither his Official nor his resistance activity to Grant Duff. However, despite Grant Duff's open condemnation to him of his appeasement cronies, he met Grant Duff and Ripka in a last visit to England after which Ripka reported to Churchill the substance of an "astounding" proposition Trott made to Ripka, which they appropriately believed emanated from Hermann Göring, for Hitler's army to withdraw from German-occupied Protectorate of Bohemia and Moravia in return for Polish territory and the Free City of Danzig, which was one of the most important ports on the Baltic.

Shiela Grant Duff's testimony regarding her friend's proposition and von Trott's using this same offer in attempt to sway Neville Chamberlain, bears upon analysis of the appeasement era and of Widerstand positioning in mid-1939. Grant Duff herself was ever-after unsure as to whether von Trott genuinely sought this transfer of territory or, saw it as a means to achieve another end, and by preventing an out-break of war, give time to some un-specific Widerstand counter-Hitler push.

== Later years ==
At the start of the Second World War, Grant Duff was working at the Royal Institute for International Affairs. She resigned the position and subsequently went to work for the BBC's European Service as their first editor of the Czech section. Her 1942 book, A German Protectorate, beside revealing a case of the administration of Nazism in occupied territory, was also a study of the inter-Continental strategic implications of German's south-eastward expansionism.

In the decades after the war, she became a farmer and, in 1982, published a memoir of her early years in journalism, The Parting of Ways. Six years later, amidst successive historians' studies of the German Widerstand and von Trott's part in it, the full correspondence between Grant Duff and von Trott saw publication. Shiela Grant Duff's final break with von Trott of June 1939, caused by the "Danzig for Prague" proposition, continued to influence a division of attitude concerning largely herself and, on the other side, those who leaned to the view that not only was the Widerstand misunderstood even prior to the Second World War, but that Churchill particularly erred in holding to the wartime policy of unconditional surrender.

== Works ==
- German and Czech: A Threat to European Peace (New Fabian Research Bureau Pamphlets. no. 36.), Victor Gollancz, 1937.
- Europe and the Czechs, Penguin Books, 1938.
- A German Protectorate. The Czechs under Nazi rule, Macmillan, 1942.
- Funf Jahre Bis Zum Krieg. Eine Engländerin im Widerstand gegen Hitler. C.H.Beck, 1978. ISBN 3-406-01412-7
- The Parting of Ways: A Personal Account of the Thirties, Peter Owen, 1982, ISBN 0-7206-0586-5.

== Family ==
Grant Duff was married twice. During her first marriage, which was in 1942, to Noel Newsome, the founder of the BBC's European Service, she had two children, and the marriage ended in divorce. In 1952, she married Micheal Sokolov Grant, originally Micheal Vicentivich Sokolov, a second-generation White Russian who served as an officer in the Royal Navy in WWII, and died in 1998. During their marriage they had three children.
