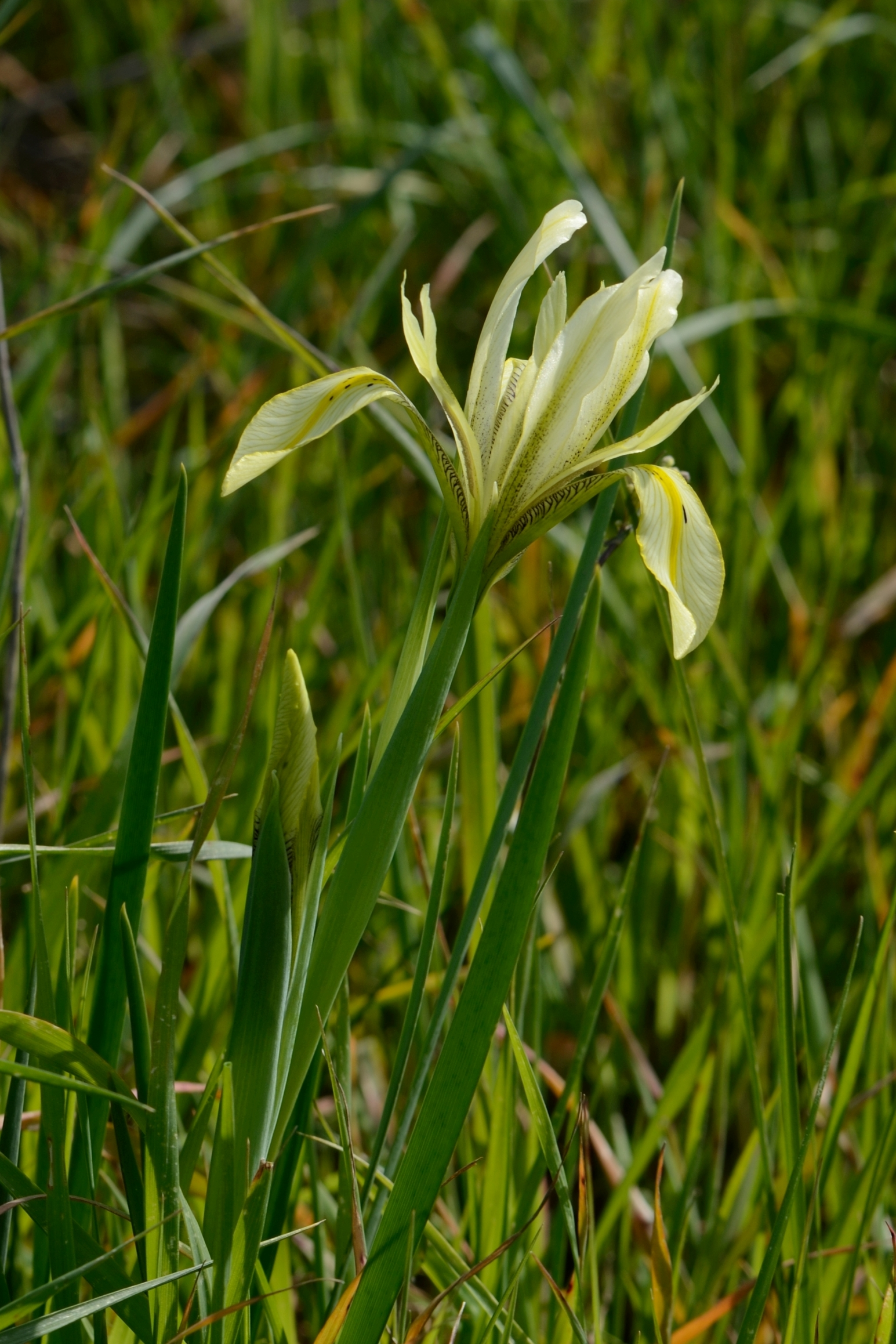
- Iris grant-duffii

Scientific classification
- Kingdom: Plantae
- Clade: Tracheophytes
- Clade: Angiosperms
- Clade: Monocots
- Order: Asparagales
- Family: Iridaceae
- Genus: Iris
- Subgenus: Iris subg. Limniris
- Section: Iris sect. Limniris
- Series: Iris ser. Syriacae

= Iris ser. Syriacae =

Group of flowering plants

Iris ser. Syriacae is a series of the genus Iris, in Iris subg. Limniris.

The series was first classified by Ludwig Diels in 'Die Natürlichen Pflanzenfamilien' (Edited by H. G. A. Engler and K. Prantl) in 1930. It was further expanded by George Hill Mathewson Lawrence in Gentes Herb (written in Dutch) in 1953.

It is named after the region where most of the species are found, Syria.

There is a similarity in the pollen and rootstock morphology between the species in the series and the bulbous reticulated irises (Hermodactyloides), (especially Iris pamphylica) that seems to suggest an evolutionary link. Seedlings of Iris masia and Iris grant-duffii, grow a small bulb with tunics (similar to the reticulata bulbs). Later, the base plate enlarges and then stretches out to create a rhizome. The rhizomes have branching, large terminal bubs, that are covered with large 'spines'. These are the leftovers from the last growing season leaf viens.

The species also have unbranched flower stems that carry a single flower head.

Although most species in this series come from the damp spring areas of Asia, most species prefer to have a very dry period in summer. They could be cultivated in the UK, in a bulb frame, if allowed to dry out in the summer. They are rare in cultivation in the UK.

Includes;

Image	Scientific name	Distribution
	Iris grant-duffii Baker	Lebanon, Israel, Syria, Turkey, Lebanon and Iraq
	Iris masia Foster	the Middle East and Asian Turkey.
