= James Grant Duff =

British soldier and historian (1789–1858)

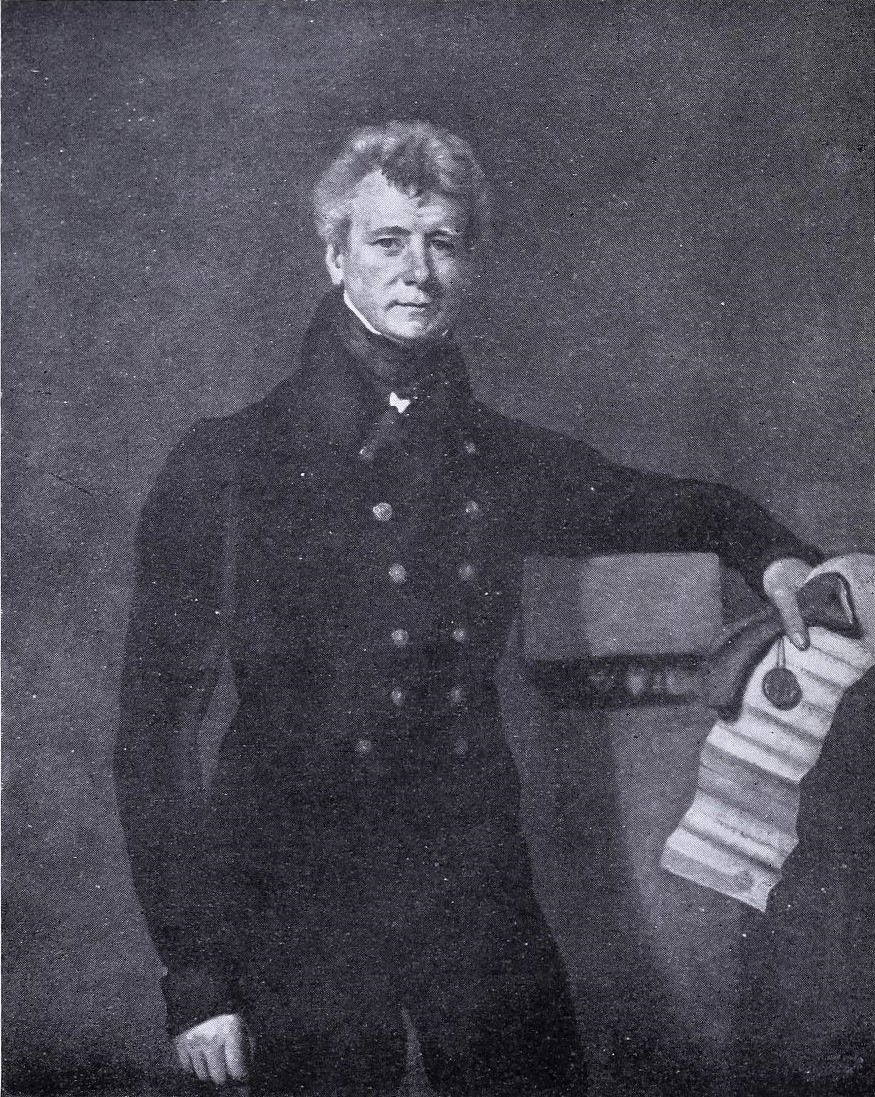
- James Cunninghame Grant Duff
- Born: 8 July 1789; Banff, Banffshire, Scotland
- Died: 23 September 1858 (aged 69); Fife, Scotland
- Other name: Cuninghame
- Occupations: Soldier, historian
- Children: 6, including M. E. Grant Duff

James Grant Duff (8 July 1789 – 23 September 1858) was a British soldier and historian from Scotland, who was active in British India.

== Early life ==
Duff was the eldest son of John Grant of Kincardine O'Neil and Margaret Miln of Eden, who died 20 August 1824. When his father died on 9 May 1799, his mother moved to Aberdeen, where he went to school, and then onto Marischal College.

== Military career ==
Grant Duff was to become a civil servant of the East India Company, but being impatient at the prospect of delay in obtaining a post he accepted a cadetship in 1805 and sailed for Bombay. After completing the cadet training in Bombay, he joined the Bombay Grenadiers. In 1808 Duff participated as an ensign in the storming of Maliah, a fortified stronghold of freebooters, where he displayed bravery. At an unusually early age he became adjutant to his regiment and Persian interpreter, and was even more influential in it than this position indicated. While still a lieutenant he attracted the attention of Mountstuart Elphinstone, then Company resident of Poona, and became, along with Henry Pottinger, his assistant and devoted friend. He was particularly successful in understanding the native character, and in discovering the mean between too rapid reform and too great deference to native prejudice and immobility.

During the long operations against the Peshwa Bajirao II, terminating in his overthrow, Grant Duff took a considerable part, both in a civil and in a military capacity, attaining the rank of captain in his regiment. Upon the settlement of the country he was appointed in 1818 to the important office of resident of Satara State. His instructions are contained in a letter of Elphinstone's, dated 8 April 1818, and his remuneration was fixed at 2000 rupees per month, with allowances of 1500 rupees per month, which was in addition to an office establishment. Here, in the heart of a warlike province, the centre of the Mahratta confederacy, with but one European companion and a body of native infantry, he succeeded in maintaining himself in a hostile environment.

By proclamation dated 11 April 1818, Elphinstone made full powers over to Grant for the arrangement of Satara's affairs of state. Pratap Singh the Rajah was rescued from his captivity by the Maratha Peshwa, after the Battle of Ashteh in February 1819, and restored to the throne under Grant Duff's tutelage. By a treaty of 25 September 1819, Grant Duff was to administer the country in the Rajah's name until 1822, and then transfer it to himself and his officers when they should prove fit for the task. Taking great care, he impressed upon the rajah that any intercourse with other princes, except such as the treaty provided for, would be punished with annexation of his territory. He trained him so successfully in the habits of business that Pratap Singh, having improved greatly under his care, was made direct ruler of Satara in 1822; but under Grant's successor, General Briggs, his behaviour was unsatisfactory. During this time, Grant concluded the treaties with the Satara jagirdars, viz. 22 April 1820, the Pant Sachiv, the Pant Pratinidhi, the Duflaykur, and the Deshmukh of Phaltan, and 3 July 1820, the Raja of Akkalkot and the Sheikh Waekur. The arrangements which he prescribed both for the etiquette of the Durbar and for the management of the revenue remained, as he had left them for many years.

== Return to Scotland ==
After five years the anxiety and toil broke down his health, and he retired to Scotland, where he occupied himself in completing A History of the Mahrattas, the materials for which he had long been collecting with great diligence and under peculiarly favorable opportunities, through his access to state papers, family and temple archives, and his personal acquaintance with the Mahratta chiefs. It was published in 1826 and was translated into the major languages of Western India, becoming required reading for Indian students during the British Raj. About 1825 he succeeded to the estate at Eden, and taking the additional name of Duff settled there, improving the property. In 1850 his wife Jane Catharine Ainslie (only daughter of Sir Whitelaw Ainslie, an eminent physician and author of the Materia Medica Indica), whom he married in 1825, succeeded to an estate in Fife belonging to her mother's family, whereupon he took the further name of Cuninghame.

== Family ==
Duff died on 23 September 1858, leaving a daughter and two sons, of whom the elder, Mountstuart Elphinstone Grant Duff, was M.P. for the Elgin Burghs, Under-Secretary for India 1868–1874, Under-Secretary for the Colonies 1880–1881, and Governor of Madras Presidency 1881–1886.

== Works ==
- Grant Duff, James. A History of the Mahrattas. Full text online at ibiblio.org (All three volumes in HTML form, complete, chapter-by-chapter, with all footnotes and a combined index)
- A History of the Mahrattas, 3 vols. London, Longmans, Rees, Orme, Brown, and Green (1826); also more recent editions, ISBN 81-7020-956-0 ISBN 1-4212-2137-3; vol. II only on line. Also, revised ed., S. M. Edwardes, London, etc., Oxford University Press (1921) Vol. II only on line.

== Bibliography ==
- This article incorporates text from a publication now in the public domain: Hamilton, John Andrew (1888). "Duff, James Grant". In Stephen, Leslie (ed.). Dictionary of National Biography. Vol. 16. London: Smith, Elder & Co. pp. 130–131.
  - Banffshire Journal, September 1858, from which all the other periodical notices are taken
  - James Grant Duff, History of the Mahrattas, 4 vols
  - Burke's Landed Gentry
  - Aitcheson, Indian Treaties, volume iv.
  - Colebrooke's Elphinstone
  - Dr. Murray Smith, 'Sattara', Calcutta Review, x.p. 437

== Literature ==
  - A.R. Kulkarni: James Cuninghame Grant Duff. Administrator-Historian of the Marathas.Kolkata : Bagchi 2006 (first English edition, first Marathi edition Jemsa Kaniṃgahêma Grênṭa Ḍapha. 31, 266 S. Puṇe : Vidyāpīṭha Prakāśana [1971?]
