= Governor Huddleston =

Governor Huddleston may refer to:

- Hubert Huddleston (1880–1950), Governor-General of Anglo-Egyptian Sudan from 1940 to 1947
- William Huddleston (colonial administrator) (1826–1894), Acting Governor of Madras in 1881
