= M. E. Grant Duff =

Scottish politician, administrator and author (1829–1906)

The Right Honourable Sir Mountstuart Grant Duff GCSI CIE FRS
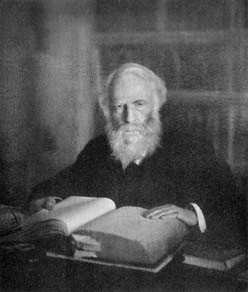

Governor of Madras Presidency
- In office 5 November 1881 – 8 December 1886
- Governors General: The Marquess of Ripon, The Earl of Dufferin
- Preceded by: William Huddleston (acting)
- Succeeded by: Robert Bourke

Under-Secretary of State for the Colonies
- In office 23 April 1880 – 26 June 1881
- Monarch: Queen Victoria
- Prime Minister: William Ewart Gladstone
- Preceded by: The Earl Cadogan
- Succeeded by: Leonard Courtney

Under-Secretary of State for India
- In office 8 December 1868 – 17 February 1874
- Monarch: Queen Victoria
- Prime Minister: William Ewart Gladstone
- Preceded by: The Lord Clinton
- Succeeded by: Lord George Hamilton

Member of Parliament for Elgin Burghs
- In office 1857–1881
- Monarch: Victoria
- Preceded by: George Skene Duff
- Succeeded by: Alexander Asher

Personal details
- Born: Mountstuart Elphinstone Grant Duff; 21 February 1829 Eden, Aberdeenshire, Scotland
- Died: 12 January 1906 (aged 76) Chelsea, London, England
- Party: Liberal
- Spouse: Anna Julia Webster
- Children: 9, including Sir Arthur Cuninghame Grant Duff: Sir Evelyn Mountstuart Grant Duff; Lt Col Adrian Grant Duff; Clara Annabel Caroline Grant Duff; Iseult Frederica Grant Duff
- Parent(s): James Grant Duff; Jane Ainslie
- Education: Balliol College, Oxford

Sir Mountstuart Elphinstone Grant Duff GCSI, CIE, PC, FRS (21 February 1829 – 12 January 1906), known as M. E. Grant Duff before 1887 and as Sir Mountstuart Grant Duff thereafter, was a Scottish politician, administrator and author. He served as the under-secretary of state for India from 1868 to 1874, under-secretary of state for the colonies from 1880 to 1881 and the governor of Madras from 1881 to 1886.

The son of the distinguished British historian James Grant Duff, he was educated at Grange School and Balliol College, Oxford, before being called to the English bar. He practised and taught law for a short time before starting a political life and entering the House of Commons as the Liberal Member of Parliament for Elgin Burghs.

His abilities won him government positions and he was Under-Secretary of State for India, Under-Secretary of State for the Colonies and Governor of Madras. His performance in politics and administration received mixed reviews during the 1880s: "a politician of brilliant promise and scant performance, of wide information which he seemed to turn to much account, of abilities which would have made the fortunes of half a dozen men and of which he made little enough."

On his return from Madras, he retired from politics and served in various art and scientific societies, before his death in 1906.

== Early life and education ==
Duff was born in Eden, Banff, Banffshire on 21 February 1829, the elder son of James Grant Duff, an East India Company army officer who administered the princely state of Satara Bombay Presidency, and his wife Jane Catherine, daughter of Sir Whitelaw Ainslie. He was named after Mountstuart Elphinstone, a governor of Bombay. He had his schooling at Edinburgh Academy and Grange School and at Balliol College, Oxford, from 1847 to 1850. He became a MA in 1853. During these years he experienced problems with his vision, and for the rest of his life he relied on the sight of others.

He studied law at the Inns of Court and passed with honours, ranked only behind James Fitzjames Stephen. He was called to the bar at Inner Temple, London on 17 November 1854 and practised as a junior under William (later Mr Justice) Field. During this time he lectured at the Working Men's College and wrote for the Saturday Review. Soon afterwards, he entered politics and joined the Liberal Party.

== Political career ==
In the 1857 election he was elected to the House of Commons as the Liberal Party's candidate for Elgin Burghs, holding the seat without interruption until 1881. He was returned unopposed at every election except in 1880, when he easily defeated a Conservative candidate. Every year from 1860, Stuart delivered an elaborate speech to his constituents, many of which were collected and reprinted, often on foreign affairs.

As an MP, Duff was mainly concerned with foreign policy, a subject on which he became known as an authority. He travelled widely, wrote extensively, and met with many of Europe's leading personalities. In 1866, he was elected rector of the University of Aberdeen, holding the post until 1872.

In 1868, William Ewart Gladstone appointed Duff Under-Secretary of State for India under the Duke of Argyll. Duff held the office until the government was defeated in 1874. He worked well with the secretary of state Argyll; their relationship was described by Duthie as 'rather deliberately obedient to Argyll; and always in agreement with him on policy'.

When Gladstone came back to power in 1880, Grant Duff was appointed Under-Secretary of State for the Colonies and sworn of the Privy Council. He served until 26 June 1881, when he was appointed Governor of Madras.

== Governor of Madras ==
He was captivated by the beach at Madras on an earlier visit to the city. As a result, when he became governor in 1881 he immediately commenced the construction of a promenade along the beach. The beach was extensively modified and layered with soft sand and was named "The Marina". The promenade was opened to the public in 1884.

On the naming of the beach, Grant Duff explained in a letter:

We have greatly benefitted Madras by turning the rather dismal beach of five years ago into one of the most beautiful promenades in the world. From old Sicilian recollections, I gave in 1884 to our new creation the name of Marina; and I was not a little amused when walking there last winter with the Italian General Saletta, he suddenly said to me 'On se dirai a Palerme'.

In 1864, several specimens of a yellow flowering iris were collected by Mr. B. T. Lowne on the banks of the river Kishon in Israel. It was later found by Grant Duff on the plains of Esdraelon (Jezreel Valley). The iris was then named after him, Iris grant-duffii.

He was a strong supporter of Dietrich Brandis in his reorganization of the Madras Forest Department and expansion of systematic forest conservancy in India.

His tenure was filled with a number of controversies and allegations of partisan behaviour and injustice. He was sharply criticised for the way he handled the Chingleput Ryots' Case and the arrests and trials following the Salem riots of 1882. The Hindu accused him of indulging in vindictive and vengeful behaviour. In one of the articles, he was criticised thus: "Oh! Lucifer! How art thou fallen? Oh! Mr Grant-Duff, how you stand like an extinct volcano in the midst of the ruins of your abortive reputation as an administrator! Erudite you may be, but a statesman you are not." He was also accused of deliberately nurturing a movement against Brahmins.

However, Louis Mallet, the then Under-Secretary of State for India, was all praise for him. On receipt of his last minute as governor, Mallett said, "I doubt whether any governor has left behind so able and so complete a record".

W. S. Blunt, the British publicist, who visited Madras in November 1884, said of Grant Duff:

"And Mr. Grant Duff?", I asked a friend. "We consider him", he said "a failure. He came out as Governor of Madras with great expectations, and we find him feeble, sickly, unable to do his work himself, and wholly in the hands of the permanent officials. The Duke of Buckingham, of whom we expected less, did much more, and much better." I found this opinion of Grant Duff a general one among the natives. Though a clever man, he had spent all his life in the confined atmosphere of the House of Commons, and was quite unable to deal with a state of society so strange to him as that which he found in India

The Madras Mahajana Sabha was established in 1884 with P. Rangaiah Naidu as its president and R. Balaji Rao as its vice-president. This is considered to be one of the oldest Indian political organisations in the Madras Presidency, notwithstanding the Madras Native Association, which was a failure. Members of the Madras Mahajana Sabha played a pivotal role in corresponding with Indian associations in other provinces and forming the Indian National Congress in 1885. The Indian National Congress held its first session at Bombay in December 1885, attended by 72 delegates including 22 from the Madras Presidency. Grant Duff was made a Companion of the Order of the Indian Empire in 1881 and a Grand Commander of the Order of the Star of India in March 1887. In July 1886, Gladstone tried to get a peerage for him but failed.

On an official visit to Rome a few years after the conclusion of his tenure, Grant Duff records that the Speaker of the Italian Parliament Biancheri inquired about the size of the province that Grant Duff had governed. On receiving the reply that the province was 'larger than Italy, including all the Italian islands', Biancheri astonishedly asked "What an empire is that, in which such a country is only a province?".

== Later life ==
On his return to England in 1887, he devoted himself to the arts and sciences. He was Lord Rector of University of Aberdeen in 1866–1872. He was member of the Athenaeum, the Cosmopolitan Club, Literary Society, Grillion's Club, Breakfast Club, and the Roxburghe Club, and was the president of the Royal Geographical Society from 1889 to 1893 and of the Royal Historical Society from 1892 to 1899. He was treasurer of the exclusive dining club known as The Club from 1893. He was elected a Fellow of the Royal Society in 1881, and was appointed a trustee of the British Museum in 1903.

He was Chairman of the Liberty and Property Defence League, established to curb socialist tendencies in the Liberal Party.

== Personal life ==
In April 1859 he married Anna Julia Webster; they had four sons and five daughters, including:

- Sir Arthur Cuninghame Grant Duff (1861–1948), who married in November 1906 Kathleen, daughter of General Powell Clayton.
- Sir Evelyn Mountstuart Grant Duff (1863–1926), who married in March 1903 Edith Florence, daughter of Sir George Francis Bonham, 2nd Baronet.
- Lieutenant-Colonel Adrian Grant-Duff, CB (1869–1914), colonel of the Black Watch, was killed at the First Battle of the Aisne in September 1914. In October 1906 Adrian married Ursula, daughter of John Lubbock, 1st Baron Avebury. One of his three daughters was Shiela Grant Duff while his son, Neill, was killed at Houdetot near St Valery-en-Caux France in 1940 whilst serving with the Black Watch.
- Clara Annabel Caroline Grant Duff (1870–1944), who married in 1895 the financier Frederick Huth Jackson.
- Iseult Frederica Grant Duff (1882–1957).

He died in his home in Chelsea, London in January 1906, aged 76, and was buried in Elgin Cathedral, Scotland.

== Ancestry ==
Ancestors of M. E. Grant Duff

James Grant
John Grant of Kincardine O'Neill
Margaret Stewart of Bonkyl
James Cunningham Grant Duff of Eden
George Miln
James Miln Duff
Margaret Duff of Corsindae
Margaret Miln Duff
William Gordon, fourth & last of Farskane
Jean Gordon
Margaret Duff of Crombie
Sir Mountstuart Elphinstone Grant Duff
Robert Ainslie of Rowallen
Robert Ainslie of Darnchester
Magdeline Elliot of Woolie
Sir Whitelaw Ainslie K.B., M.D
John Whitelaw of Whitelaw
Katherine Whitelaw of Whitelaw
Rachel Stirling
Jane Catharine Ainslie
James Cunninghame of Balbogie
Mary Cunninghame
George Stirling of Carnock
Jean Ogilvy
Janet Hamilton of Preston

== Works ==
- Mountstuart Elphinstone Grant Duff (1866). Studies in European Politics. Edmonston and Douglas. (Scan)
- Mountstuart Elphinstone Grant Duff. Elgin Speeches. 1871. (Scan)
- Mountstuart Elphinstone Grant Duff (1876). Notes of an Indian journey. Macmillan and Company. (Scan)
- Mountstuart Elphinstone Grant Duff (1893). Ernest Renan: In memoriam. Macmillan and Company. (Scan)
- Notes from a diary. London: John Murray. - (1851-1872):1 2 - (1873-1881):1 2 - (1881-1886):1 2 - (1886-1888):1 2 - (1889-1891):1 2 - (1892-1895):1 2 - (1896-1901):1 2
- Mountstuart Elphinstone Grant Duff (1868). A Political Survey. (Scan)
- Mountstuart Elphinstone Grant Duff (1903). Out of the past. Some biographical essays. volume 1 volume 2

== Notes ==
Parliament of the United Kingdom
Preceded by George Skene Duff	Member of Parliament for Elgin Burghs; 1857–1881	Succeeded by Alexander Asher
Political offices
Preceded by The Lord Clinton	Under-Secretary of State for India; 1868–1874	Succeeded by Lord George Hamilton
Preceded by The Earl Cadogan	Under-Secretary of State for the Colonies; 1880–1881	Succeeded by Leonard Courtney
Preceded by William Huddleston	Governor of Madras; 1881–1886	Succeeded by Robert Bourke
Academic offices
Preceded by The Earl Russell	Rector of the University of Aberdeen; 1866–1872	Succeeded by Thomas Henry Huxley
Preceded by The Lord Aberdare	President of the Royal Historical Society; 1891–1899	Succeeded by Sir Adolphus William Ward
