= William Patrick Adam =

British colonial administrator and Liberal politician

The Right Honourable William Patrick Adam CIE DL
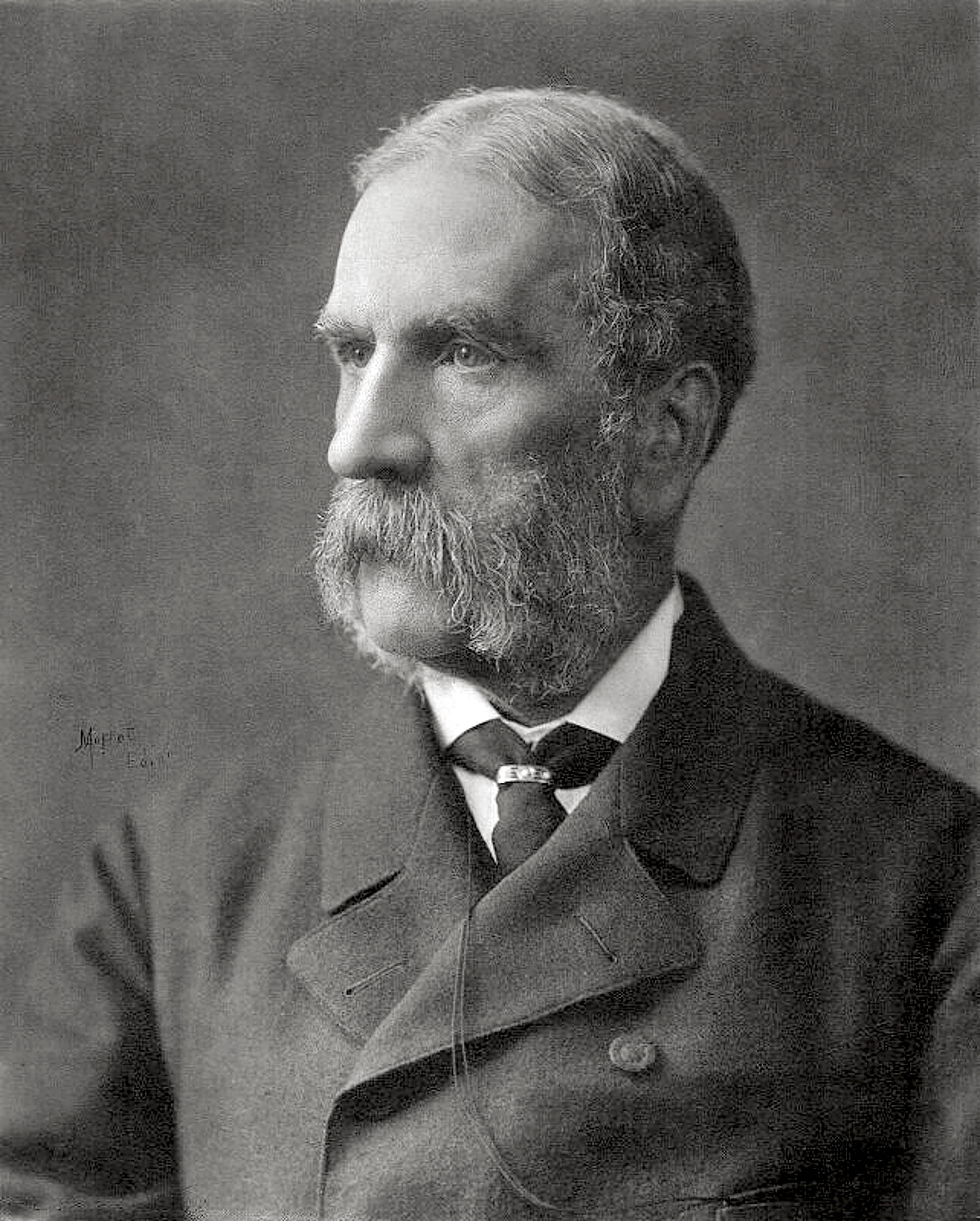
- Adam c. 1880

First Commissioner of Works
- In office 11 August 1873 – 17 February 1874
- Monarch: Victoria
- Prime Minister: William Gladstone
- Preceded by: Acton Smee Ayrton
- Succeeded by: Lord Henry Lennox
- In office 3 May 1880 – 1880
- Monarch: Victoria
- Prime Minister: William Gladstone
- Preceded by: Hon. Gerard Noel
- Succeeded by: George Shaw-Lefevre

Paymaster General
- In office 30 September 1873 – 17 February 1874
- Monarch: Victoria
- Prime Minister: William Gladstone
- Preceded by: Hugh Childers
- Succeeded by: Stephen Cave

Governor of Madras Presidency
- In office 20 December 1880 – 24 May 1881
- Preceded by: The Duke of Buckingham and Chandos
- Succeeded by: William Huddleston (acting)

Personal details
- Born: 14 September 1823
- Died: 24 May 1881 (aged 57) Ooty, British India
- Party: Liberal
- Spouse: Emily Wyllie (1838–1906)
- Education: Trinity College, Cambridge

William Patrick Adam, CIE, DL (14 September 1823 – 24 May 1881) was a British colonial administrator and Liberal politician. He was twice First Commissioner of Works under William Gladstone and also served briefly as Governor of Madras between 1880 and 1881.

== Background and education ==
Adam was the son of Admiral Sir Charles Adam, son of William Adam, only surviving son of the architect John Adam, brother of architects Robert Adam and James Adam. His mother was Elizabeth Brydone, daughter of Patrick Brydone, while John Adam and Sir Frederick Adam were his uncles. He was educated at Rugby and Trinity College, Cambridge, and was called to the Bar, Inner Temple, in 1849.

== Political career ==
Adam was secretary to the Governor of Bombay, Lord Elphinstone (his second cousin), from 1853 to 1858. In 1859 he was elected Member of Parliament for Clackmannan and Kinross, a seat he held until 1880. He served as a Lord of the Treasury under Lord Palmerston and Lord Russell from 1865 to 1866 and under Gladstone from 1868 to 1873. In August 1873 he was sworn of the Privy Council and appointed First Commissioner of Works by Gladstone. In September of the same year he was given the additional post of Paymaster General, and retained both offices until the fall of the Gladstone government in February 1874.

Between 1874 and 1880 Adam was a Liberal whip. When the Liberals returned to power under Gladstone in May 1880, he was once again made First Commissioner of Works. In December 1880 he was appointed Governor of Madras, which he remained until his death in May of the following year.

Adam was also the author of Thoughts on Policy of Retaliation and served as a Deputy Lieutenant of Kinross-shire and Fife.

== Personal life ==
Adam married Emily, daughter of General Sir William Wyllie, in 1856. They had several children. Adam died in May 1881, aged 57, in Ooty, British India, where he was also buried. His wife Emily was awarded the Order of the Crown of India in October 1881. In 1882 their eldest son Charles Adam was created a baronet, of Blair Adam in the County of Kinross, in honour of his father (see Adam baronets) and the same year Emily Adam was granted the precedence of a baronet's wife. She died in November 1906.

Parliament of the United Kingdom
Preceded by Viscount Melgund	Member of Parliament for Clackmannan and Kinross; 1859–1880	Succeeded by John Balfour
Political offices
Preceded by Edward Knatchbull-Hugessen; Sir William Dunbar, Bt; Hon. Luke White	Lord of the Treasury; 1865–1866; With: Hon. Luke White 1865–1866; John Bonham-Carter 1866; John Esmonde 1866	Succeeded by Hon. Gerard Noel; Sir Graham Graham-Montgomery, Bt; Henry Whitmore
Preceded by Sir Graham Graham-Montgomery, Bt; Henry Whitmore; Lord Claud Hamilton	Lord of the Treasury; 1868–1873; With: James Stansfeld 1868–1869; The Marquess of Lansdowne 1868–1872; John Cranch Walker Vivian 1868–1870; William Henry Gladstone 1869–1873	Succeeded by William Henry Gladstone; Lord Frederick Cavendish; Hon. Algernon Greville
Preceded by Acton Smee Ayrton	First Commissioner of Works; 1873–1874	Succeeded by Lord Henry Lennox
Preceded by Hugh Childers	Paymaster General; 1873–1874	Succeeded by Stephen Cave
Preceded by Hon. Gerard Noel	First Commissioner of Works; 1880	Succeeded by George Shaw-Lefevre
Government offices
Preceded by The Duke of Buckingham and Chandos	Governor of Madras; 1880–1881	Succeeded by William Huddleston (acting)
