= Evelyn Grant Duff =

British diplomat

Sir Evelyn Mountstuart Grant Duff KCMG (9 October 1863 – 19 September 1926) was a British diplomat who was stationed in Iran at a key moment, and was ambassador to Switzerland.

He was the second son of M.E. Grant Duff (later Sir Mountstuart Grant Duff). He passed the Preliminary Examination for the Civil Services in 1883 and entered the Diplomatic Service in 1888. He served in Rome, Tehran (1892–1894), Saint Petersburg, Stockholm and Berlin before a post in London 1899–1903.

He was Secretary of Legation in Tehran 1903–06, and in early 1903 took part in the special mission (headed by Lord Downe) deputized by the King to travel to Iran to present the Shah with the insignia of the Order of the Garter. In the summer of 1906 there was no minister (ambassador) in post – the previous minister, Sir Arthur Hardinge, had left in 1905 and the new minister, Sir Cecil Spring Rice, although appointed in December 1905, did not leave England until September 1906 – so Grant Duff was the senior British diplomat in Tehran when, during the Persian Constitutional Revolution, about 12,000 men took sanctuary (bast) in the gardens of the British Legation in what has been called a 'vast open-air school of political science' studying constitutionalism. The Foreign Secretary, Sir Edward Grey, was outraged by Grant Duff's hospitality towards the bastis which, however, inadvertently expedited the Constitutional Revolution.

Grant Duff had already been appointed to be Councillor at the Embassy in Madrid and he took up that post in late 1906. While in Madrid he negotiated the purchase of land at the corner of Calle de Núñez de Balboa and calle de Hermosilla for a British Embassy Church. Building did not start until 1923, and it was dedicated as the Church of St George in 1925.

In 1910 Grant Duff was appointed Minister to Venezuela, but he did not take up the post; he was Consul-General to the Kingdom of Hungary, in Budapest, 1911–13 before his final post as British Envoy to the Swiss Confederation, 1913–16.

He was appointed CMG in 1911 and knighted KCMG in 1916 on the termination of his mission in Berne.

In 1900 he married Edith Florence Bonham, elder daughter of Sir George Bonham, 2nd Baronet (who was British Envoy to the Swiss Confederation, 1905–09). She was appointed a Lady of Grace of the Order of St John of Jerusalem in 1916 and CBE in 1918 as "Founder and Organiser of the Bread Bureau for Prisoners of War." She founded the "British Legation Red Cross Organization" through which the many British expatriates in Switzerland helped wounded soldiers in French and British hospitals.

He died in Bath on 19 September 1926.

Diplomatic posts
Preceded by Esme William Howard	Minister to the Swiss Confederation; 1913–1916	Succeeded by Sir Horace Rumbold, 9th Baronet
