= Adrian Grant Duff =

British officer and administrator

Lieutenant Colonel Adrian Grant Duff, C.B. (29 September 1869 – 14 September 1914), was a British officer and administrator. He was responsible for creating the "War Book", the British Army's plan to deploy to the European continent, and commanded the 1st Battalion the Black Watch (Royal Highlanders) during the opening months of World War I.

== Life ==
Born in London on 29 September 1869, he was the third son of Mountstuart Elphinstone Grant Duff and his wife Anna Julia Webster. He was educated at Wellington College and the Royal Military College (Sandhurst), commissioning into the 2nd Battalion the Black Watch as a second lieutenant on 23 March 1889.

Grant Duff was promoted to lieutenant on 22 October 1890, and served in peacetime roles around the British Empire. He rejected a plan to transfer to the British South Africa Police, based on advice from Robert Henry Meade. He saw action during the Tirah campaign (1897–1898) and was promoted to captain on 3 August 1898. Following the outbreak of the Second Boer War he served with his regiment in South Africa from 1899 to 1902, taking part in operations in Cape Colony, south of Orange River in late 1899, including the campaign to relieve Kimberley, where he was slightly wounded in the battle of Magersfontein (December 1899). After his return to the United Kingdom he attended Staff College, Camberley in 1903, before being seconded to the War Office in 1905 as staff captain. He became Assistant Secretary to the Committee of Imperial Defence there in 1910.

At the War Office Grant Duff wrote Coordination of Departmental Action on the Occurrence of Strained Relations and on the Outbreak of War, commonly known as the "War Book", which highlighted flaws in the British Government's preparations for a European War, and formed the basis for the British Expeditionary Force's plan to deploy to France and Belgium in 1914. He was much more impressed with the naval officer George Alexander Ballard than his superior Ernest Troubridge of the War Staff. Grant Duff was conservative, and held a low opinion of politicians in general, and the government handling of the Curragh incident in particular, as political interference in a military matter.

In 1913 Grant Duff returned to the 1st Battalion the Black Watch and commanded the battalion in France and Belgium throughout the Retreat from Mons and the Battle of the Marne, before being killed in action at the Battle of the Aisne on 14 September 1914. He was buried in Moulins.

== Family ==
Grant Duff married in 1906 Ursula Lubbock (born 1885), daughter of John Lubbock, 1st Baron Avebury. They had a son and three daughters.
