= Basil Newton =

British diplomat

- Born: 25 July 1889
- Died: 15 May 1965 (aged 75)
- Occupation: Diplomat

Sir Basil Cochrane Newton KCMG (25 July 1889 – 15 May 1965) was a British diplomat who was ambassador to Czechoslovakia and Iraq.

== Early career ==
Newton was the youngest son of George Onslow Newton and his third wife, Lady Alice Cochrane, daughter of the 11th Earl of Dundonald. He was educated at Wellington College and King's College, Cambridge. He joined the Foreign Office in 1912 and served in Peking 1925–29, then in Berlin 1930–37, for the last two years with the rank of Minister and chargé d'affaires in the absence of the ambassador, Sir Eric Phipps.

== Minister in Prague ==
In 1937 Newton was appointed Minister (equivalent to ambassador) at Prague, where

the most momentous though to him probably the least agreeable task of his career was to present to President Beneš of Czechoslovakia in September, 1938, the decision of the British and French Governments that he must hand over the Sudeten area to Germany or forfeit all hope of support from the two western powers.

One of Newton's predecessors as minister to Prague, Sir Joseph Addison, had strong anti-Czech prejudices as the only local friends he made during his six years in Prague from 1930 to 1936 were members of the ethnic German nobility of Bohemia, who were adversely affected by the land reforms of the 1920s when the Czechoslovak government had broken up the estates of the nobility to give the ethnic Czech farmers who worked the estates ownership of the land. The aristocracy of Bohemia who were German-speaking, Roman Catholic and still loyal to the former Austrian empire disliked Czechoslovakia, a state that was republican, secular and dominated by ethnic Czechs, and Addison had largely adopted their prejudices as his own. Addison's dispatches to London, which had portrayed the ethnic Germans of the Sudetenland as being oppressed by boorish and crude Czechs, had largely convinced the Foreign Office that it was the Czechs who were causing all the problems in Czechoslovakia, and Newton had arrived in Prague in 1937 already convinced of the justice of the complaints of the Sudeten Germans. Furthermore, like most of the British elite during the interwar period, Newton believed that the Treaty of Versailles was too harsh on Germany and needed to be revised in favour of the Reich, which had made him very sympathetic towards Nazi Germany and hostile to Czechoslovakia. The only thing that Newton appeared to have taken away from his time as the chargé d'affaires at the British Embassy in Berlin in 1935-36 was that the Treaty of Versailles was intolerably harsh on Germany and needed to be revised if the peace of Europe was to be saved.

Starting in February 1937, the British government believing that Czechoslovakia could not last as a unitary state, applied strong pressure on President Edvard Beneš of Czechoslovakia to transform his multi-ethnic country into a federation with autonomy for the various peoples of Czechoslovakia, pressure that Beneš had stoutly resisted saying that nothing needed to be changed in Czechoslovakia. The American historian Gerhard Weinberg wrote that this was a major error on the part on Beneš as the Sudeten Nazi leader Konrad Henlein was secretly working for Berlin and had orders to negotiate in bad faith for his demand for autonomy for the Sudetenland as the last thing that Adolf Hitler wanted were constitutional changes to Czechoslovakia which might stabilize that country, and as Beneš by refusing to negotiate at all with Henlein allowed the latter to portray himself as a "moderate", which led British officials to the conclusion that Beneš was the difficult one.

Beneš disliked Newton, calling him a "thick-headed ignoramus" who knew nothing of Central Europe, and was an arrogant Germanophile to boot, complaining that he always took the side of Germany against his own country. Beneš much preferred the company of Victor de Laçroix, the pro-Czech and anti-German French minister in Prague, who in his dispatches to Paris tended to take Czechoslovakia's side against Germany. Laçroix was so pro-Czech that when he received orders in September 1938 from the Foreign Minister, Georges Bonnet, to tell Beneš that Czechoslovakia must hand the Sudetenland over to Germany that he found himself breaking into tears as he did so, saying that this was not his wish at all. Sir Robert Vansittart, the Germanophobic and Francophile Permanent Undersecretary at the Foreign Office from 1930-1937 and Special Diplomatic Adviser from 1937-1941, often criticised Newton for the pro-German tone of his dispatches to London. Shiela Grant Duff, the Central European correspondent of The Observer, wrote how she had been "terribly depressed by the cynical and uncaring attitude of my fellow countrymen", writing that after meeting Newton she had found he was completely convinced of the thesis that the Treaty of Versailles had challenged the "natural" dynamic of Central Europe by putting the Czechs on top of the Germans, and it was Britain's duty to restore the natural state of things by putting the Germans on top of the Czechs. However, Bruce Lockhart during a visit to Prague in the spring of 1938 wrote that Newton:

"...knew both the Czech and German points of view. A descendant of Cochrane, he has much of that great admiral's phlegm...Shrewd in judgement and tactful in manner, he possesses an almost judicial impartiality, a quality valuable in a diplomatist, essential in a country like Czechoslovakia, and unfortunately not possessed by all previous British ministers in Prague. Basil Newton, I felt, was a sound man for a delicate and most difficult mission".

Lockhart praised the British legation in Prague as being "exotically furnished" with Chinese art that Newton had purchased during his time as a diplomat in Beijing, stating Newton was a man who knew Chinese art very well. Newton spoke both German and Czech, but he preferred the company of Henlein whom he saw as a more reasonable man than President Beneš.

Newton often made racist statements in his dispatches portraying the Czechs as vulgar and stupid Slavs who were not capable of running a state. In one dispatch to Lord Halifax, the Foreign Secretary, Newton wrote that the Czechs had a "temperamental obstinacy" which made them incapable of compromising with the Sudeten Germans, stating that Czechoslovakia was becoming "more untenable every day". Newton attacked Czechoslovakia for making an alliance with France, which he presented as one of the root causes of all the problems in relations between Prague and Berlin, writing whether "a permanent solution can be expected unless Czechoslovakia is, if not to give up her existing alliance with France, at least to challenge its character". Newton noted that as long as Czechoslovakia was allied to France, then Prague believed that the country was more or less safe from a German invasion, which meant that "the Castle", as the Czechs called their government, saw little need to accommodate German wishes. Newton argued that the best solution for the problems of Central Europe was to Czechoslovakia to renounce its alliances with France, the Soviet Union, Yugoslavia and Romania, which would turn Czechoslovakia into "a kind of sanctuary or reserved area immunised against aggression". The British historian Peter Neville wrote that through Newton professed to be trying to turn Czechoslovakia into a neutral state like Switzerland with his call for Czechoslovakia to give up all of its alliances, but one result of his plan for neutralisation would have been to weaken Czechoslovakia in regards to Germany by depriving it of its allies.

On 15 March 1938, Newton wrote in a dispatch to London: "If I am right in thinking that Czechoslovakia's present political position is not permanently tenable, it will be no kindness, in the long run, to try and maintain her in it". Newton believed that main Sudeten German leader, Konrad Henlein, was a "moderate" who was only asking for autonomy for the Sudetenland, and that President Beneš was the principal source of the tensions within Czechoslovakia, by insisting on maintaining a unitary state instead of agreeing to British plans to turn Czechoslovakia into a federation of autonomous ethnic groups. Newton's repeated statements in his dispatches, that Czechoslovakia with its mixture of Czechs, Slovaks, Germans, Poles, Ukrainians, and Magyars, would not last as a unitary state and that her only hope of survival was to become a federation, did much to influence British decision-makers in London. Lord Halifax cited Newton's analysis in cabinet meetings, asking what was the point of going to war to defend Czechoslovakia, a state that was doomed to break up sooner or later as its unitary constitution simply would not last.

On 9 May 1938, Newton told the Czechoslovak Foreign Minister Kamil Krofta that it was the view of H.M Government that it "would be very difficult to defend Czechoslovakia" and even if Britain did come to Czechoslovakia's aid in the event of a German attack it "would still have to be decided whether the Czechoslovak State could be re-established in its present form". Newton told Krofta bluntly that Britain did not "bluff" and that British public opinion would not support going to war with Germany to keep the Sudetenland part of Czechoslovakia. On 16 May 1938, Newton wrote in a dispatch to Halifax that he wondered if there was "any permanent halfway house between a Czechoslovakia within her present frontiers...and the abandonment to Germany of the whole area covered by the Historic Provinces (save perhaps such parts as might be snatched by the Poles)". Newton appeared to be saying that Germany should be allowed take almost all of the old Austrian Crownlands of Bohemia and Moravia (the "Historic Provinces") while Poland be allowed to take the Teschen area. This was well beyond what Newton's government was prepared to consider in the spring of 1938. Later in May 1938, Lord Halifax took Vincent Massey, the Canadian high commissioner in London, aside for a talk to ask him about how English-Canadians and French-Canadians got along in the Canadian federation, saying that Canadian style federalism was the solution he envisioned for Czechoslovakia.

In the spring of 1938, Newton formed an alliance with Sir Nevile Henderson, the British ambassador in Berlin, to work together to persuade decision-makers in London to side with Germany against Czechoslovakia. When Henderson sent Newton a private letter praising him for his pro-German dispatches on 19 May 1938, the latter replied with a letter saying he hoped Henderson would "be awarded the Nobel Peace Prize and when that is done, I hope I may receive honorable mention. You have much the hardest job".

In the spring and summer of 1938, Newton presented numerous British notes in Prague demanding concessions to Henlein. On 4 September 1938, President Beneš announced the "Fourth Plan" for the federalisation of Czechoslovakia, which had granted substantial autonomy to the Sudetenland; Newton told Beneš that "Evidence of progress were in my opinion scanty and unconvincing", adding that the failure of Beneš to keep his 1937 promise to appoint more ethnic Germans as civil servants in the Sudetenland "had made a very bad impression in London". On 15 September 1938, Newton sent a rare pro-Czech dispatch to London writing of the "far-sighted patriotism, moral courage and wisdom of the Czech government and people. I think it is very important not only to sweeten the pill for M. Beneš and his government personally, but also to help them in every possible way to convince their public that the decision [to cede the Sudetenland] is in the best interests of the country". On 20 September 1938, Newton advised that "a kind of ultimatum" should be presented to Prague if they rejected the Anglo-French plan to cede the Sudetenland to Germany, saying if the Czechoslovaks refused, "His Majesty's Government will take no further interest in the fate of the country". When Beneš threatened to invoke the 1936 arbitration treaty with Germany, Newton told the president: "an appeal to arbitration would be folly and would mean war". On 22 September 1938, Newton reported to London: "My experience of the National Socialist German methods as applied both in Germany and here and I am gravely apprehensive as that those in control of the Reich may now allege that conditions have so gone to pieces in Czechoslovakia that a new situation has arisen entitling them almost as a duty to intervene after all". Given these views, Newton welcomed the Munich Agreement of 30 September 1938 as a triumph of British justice and fair play that overturned one of the great "injustices" of the Treaty of Versailles by allowing the Sudetenland to finally join Germany.

== Ambassador in Baghdad ==
In 1939 he was transferred as ambassador to Baghdad. When Newton arrived in Baghdad, he found that Iraqi public opinion was greatly exercised by the Arab Revolt in Palestine that had begun in 1936, and there was a strong feeling of Anglophobia in Iraq as there was a widespread feeling that British policies in Palestine were anti-Muslim and anti-Arab. Newton was especially worried about the Palestine Defense League, which solicited support for the Palestinian rebels. Despite the White Paper issued in May 1939 sharply restricting Jewish immigration to the Palestine Mandate, which was intended to appease Arab anger, Newton stated the feeling in Iraq was that the White Paper did not go far enough in ending Jewish immigration. In the summer of 1939, Newton described Iraq as a nation on the verge of revolution with daily demonstrations and bombings.

On 19 April 1939, Newton in a display to London accused Sami Shawkat, the Iraqi educational director-general, "of fostering in the schools, with Nazi methods, an enthusiasm for pan-Arab ideals". Newton felt the Iraqi Prime Minister, Nuri al-Said was performing a delicate balancing act between maintaining Iraq's alliance with Britain vs. appeasing the violently anti-British mood of the Iraqi people. Newton reported to Lord Halifax on 15 August 1939: "There are many, however, among whom Taha al-Hashimi, the Minister of Defense, is conspicuous, who rather that the Iraqi Government took up more actively and openly the cause of the Arabs in Palestine, even at the risk of damaging Anglo-Iraqi relations". During his time in Iraq, Newton was closely involved in the negotiations beginning in May 1939 for Britain to extend Iraq a loan of £3,250,000 in military credits and £2,000,000 in commercial credits. However, Newton fell out of favour with the Foreign Office when he advised that Britain accommodate Iraq's request for 3% interest rate instead of the 5% interest rate the Treasury favoured. "Soon after the Second World War began serious trouble broke out in Iraq. Newton was essentially a European and had no experience of the Middle East and its languages, but he gained and retained throughout the crisis the complete confidence of the Regent, Emir Abdul Ilah." In 1941 he was recalled to London and served there until he retired in 1946.

Newton was appointed CMG in 1929 and knighted KCMG in the 1939 New Year Honours.

== Notes ==
Diplomatic posts
Preceded by Sir Charles Bentinck	Envoy Extraordinary and Minister Plenipotentiary at Prague; 1937–1939	Succeeded by Sir Robert Bruce Lockhart
Preceded by Sir Maurice Peterson	Ambassador Extraordinary and Plenipotentiary at Bagdad; 1939–1941	Succeeded by Sir Kinahan Cornwallis
