= Noel Newsome =

Director of the BBC's European Service between 1941 and 1944

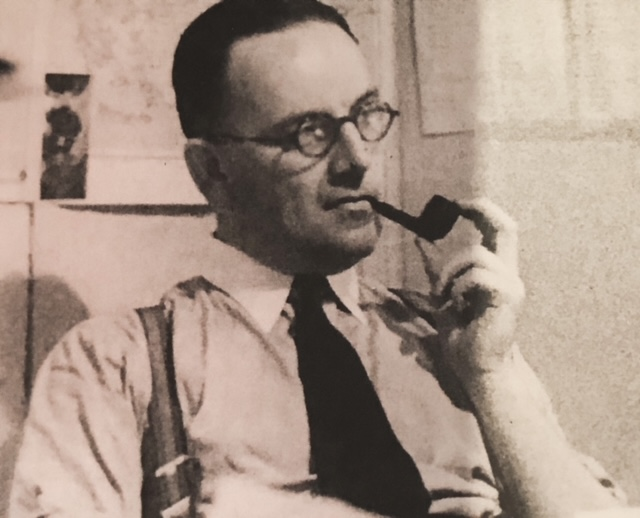
Noel Newsome

Noel Newsome (1906–1976) was the BBC European Service Director between 1941 and 1944. Prior to his appointment he was the chief news editor for the service, having taken over the role on September 1, 1939 - two days before Britain declared war on Germany. Along with his deputy Dougles Ritchie, Newsome is credited with having been responsible for every word spoken over the BBC European Service microphones at its Bush House facility until shortly after D-Day in June 1944. Newsome is also credited with being the first news editor to broadcast exclusive details of the Japanese raid on Pearl Harbor on the BBC in December 1941.

== Early life ==
Noel. F. Newsome was born in 1906 and raised in the village of Pill in Somerset where his father, a country doctor ran a medical practice. He attended Naish House Preparatory School, before proceeding to the public school at Oundle. Thereafter he progressed to Magdalen College in Oxford where he gained a first in history.

== Journalistic career ==
Newsome decided against an academic career, and instead opted for a career in Journalism. His first engagement was as a cub reporter with the Bristol Times and Mirror where he progressed to writing lead articles, before transferring to the Evening Times and Echo. where he was elevated to the position of sub-editor. It was here that he had his first 'scoop' when he was first to report on the splitting of the atom by Lord Rutherford at the Cavendish Laboratory at Cambridge University. Shortly after he married his first wife Pauline he successfully applied for a position as a reporter at the Daily Telegraph and thereafter relocated to London. Newsome conceded that he was not a success as a lead writer with the Telegraph, as his political alignment was not in tune with that of the newspaper. Unable to make any impact at the paper, Newsome seized an opportunity to travel to Malaysia to edit a newspaper in Kuala Lumpa called the Malay Mail. In 1935, with the situation in Europe looking increasing bleak, Newsome returned to the Daily Telegraphy to take up a sub-editor position on the foreign news desk where he became a severe critic of Prime Minister Neville Chamberlain's policy of appeasement in his dealings with German Chancellor Adolf Hitler.

== The BBC European Service ==
At the beginning of September 1939 Newsome was conscripted from the Daily Telegraph into the role of BBC European news editor two days before war was declared. Persons experienced in directing radio propaganda barely existed in Britain at that time, and it was believed that a top line journalist would be best suited to the role. Newsome immediately teamed up with his former sub-editor at the same newspaper Douglas Ritchie. Initially, the service was hampered by lack of transmitters, paucity of funding and scarcity of experienced personnel – at that time the service was staffed by no more than thirty men. Within a few months the headcount rose to around 200, then within two years to around 500 men and women. It was Newsome who would set out the BBC's strategy for news as a weapon of war, and go on to direct a huge broadcasting operation mounted in twenty-five different languages for a total of over twenty-three hours a day. In October 1941 Newsome was elevated to European service director by the newly appointed European service controller Ivone Kirkpatrick – formerly an advisor to the service on foreign affairs. Thereafter the split from the BBC's Overseas Service that Newsome had long been requesting was formerly actioned. In December 1940, after BBC Broadcasting House had been bombed, the European Service transferred to a disused ice rink at Maida Vale under an enormous glass roof. Newsome complained bitterly of the danger of the situation, and not until Kirkpatrick joined the BBC's European Service was Newsome's complaint taken seriously. Kirkpatrick effected the transfer of the whole department to Bush House, and barely two months later in May 1941, the former Maida Vale facility received a direct hit.

=== Radio propaganda ===
Under Kirkpatrick's guidance, the BBC European Service was gradually expanded to become the largest broadcasting unit in the world. Newsome believed that it was a cardinal function of the BBC's European Service to tell the truth - good or bad. During the Norway Campaign when the service was used as a blind tool to try and deceive the German High Command, he vented his full fury towards the War Office. He instructed his team that the essence of successful propaganda to Europe was to tell bad news fully in a confident tone, and report good news in a sober tone. He felt that good news needed little embroidery and that to tell bad news honestly and boldly was a sure sign of strength. Later in 1941 Newsome was instrumental in extending the V Campaign across other languages on the European Service.

The V Campaign, began by Victor Lavelaye on the BBC's Belgian Service became one of the most successful radio propaganda initiatives of the war. When rumors were abound that the Allies intended opening a second front in 1942, Newsome was dead set against raising hopes among the people in Europe under occupation that a new phase was imminent, a position that brought him into conflict with Winston Churchill who summoned him to Downing Street. Newsome impressed upon the prime minister that the cost of using the service to throw dust in the eyes of the enemy was too damaging for the service as the Norway debacle had shown, and importantly was a dangerous folly that might incite premature uprisings in the various occupied countries. Newsome also struck up a friendship with Free French leader Charles de Gaulle - 'he was a great source of intelligence that I couldn't always get from our own authorities.' He supported the General at times when he felt that the BBC and the Ministry of Information were obstructing him, and was often frustrated by the continual censoring of his anti-Vichy propaganda.

=== The Man in the Street ===
In 1941 Newsome set up a new English language service on the European network called London Calling Europe directly under his control, and began broadcasting his own personal version of events under the title The Man in the Street. It was an initiative that threatened to put him on a collision course with the Foreign Office and, particularly with the Minister of Information Brendan Bracken, as his broadcasts typically reflected more than a hint of socialist thinking. Newsome was warned by Bracken that 'the red propaganda must cease' and on another occasion demanded that Newsome be removed from his position for showing him a lack of respect. Bracken eventually came to understand the pressure that news editors were under and was quick to praise Newsome when he felt he had done a good job, and later recommended Newsome for an OBE which he received from King George VI.

=== Other controversies ===
Newsome conceded in his memoirs that he was permanently at war with the Foreign Office during his time at the BBC, as his opinionated approach and left wing tendencies often caused friction and resentment. There were also clashes of personality and opinion with key service editors Darsie Gillie (French Service) and Hugh Carleton-Greene (German service) who would eventually progress to becoming Director General of the corporation. In her introduction to the posthumously published memoirs of Noel Newsome, Newsome's second wife Sheila Grant-Duff, who was chief editor on the BBC's service to Czechoslovakia, claimed that after the war Newsome was 'banned by the BBC and his whole war record was shoved aside and forgotten'. Newsome also made enemies at the corporation by allowing little deference to higher authority, and had previously been warned by his bosses prior to D-Day that he was too much of a crusader to have a future in broadcasting. After the war, Newsome was especially distressed when eminent colleagues of his who remained at the BBC, such as European talks editor Alan Bullock and Deputy Controller Harman Grisewood, made no mention of him when broadcasting their memoirs of the service after the war. Not until a quarter of a century after Newsome left the BBC's European service, was he acknowledged as a central figure in the organisation in Asa Briggs' History of Broadcasting in the United Kingdom.

Thereafter Newsome's achievements at the BBC, along with those of European service Controller Ivone Kirkpatrick, whose appointment was also resented by BBC staff, have continued to be underplayed in successive BBC Histories throughout the fifty years since Briggs' account. In 2022 a new history of the BBC's wartime propaganda 'The Radio Front - the BBC and the Propaganda War' has attempted to bring Newsome and Kirkpatrick's distinguished records at the service into the open, complete with reference to Newsome's twenty-two boxes of propaganda directives that reside in the Churchill College Archive in Cambridge.

== After the BBC ==
Shortly after the invasion of Europe Operation Overlord began in June 1944, Newsome left his role at the BBC to join the broadcasting arm of the Supreme Headquarters of the Allied Expeditionary Force (SHAEF). When the Radio Luxembourg transmitter was captured by US Forces Newsome provided valuable assistance to the German Section. After the war he joined the National Coal Board in 1947 as head of their public relations department. In the 1960s he retired with his third wife Barbara to Marton Village in Warwickshire where he died in 1976.
