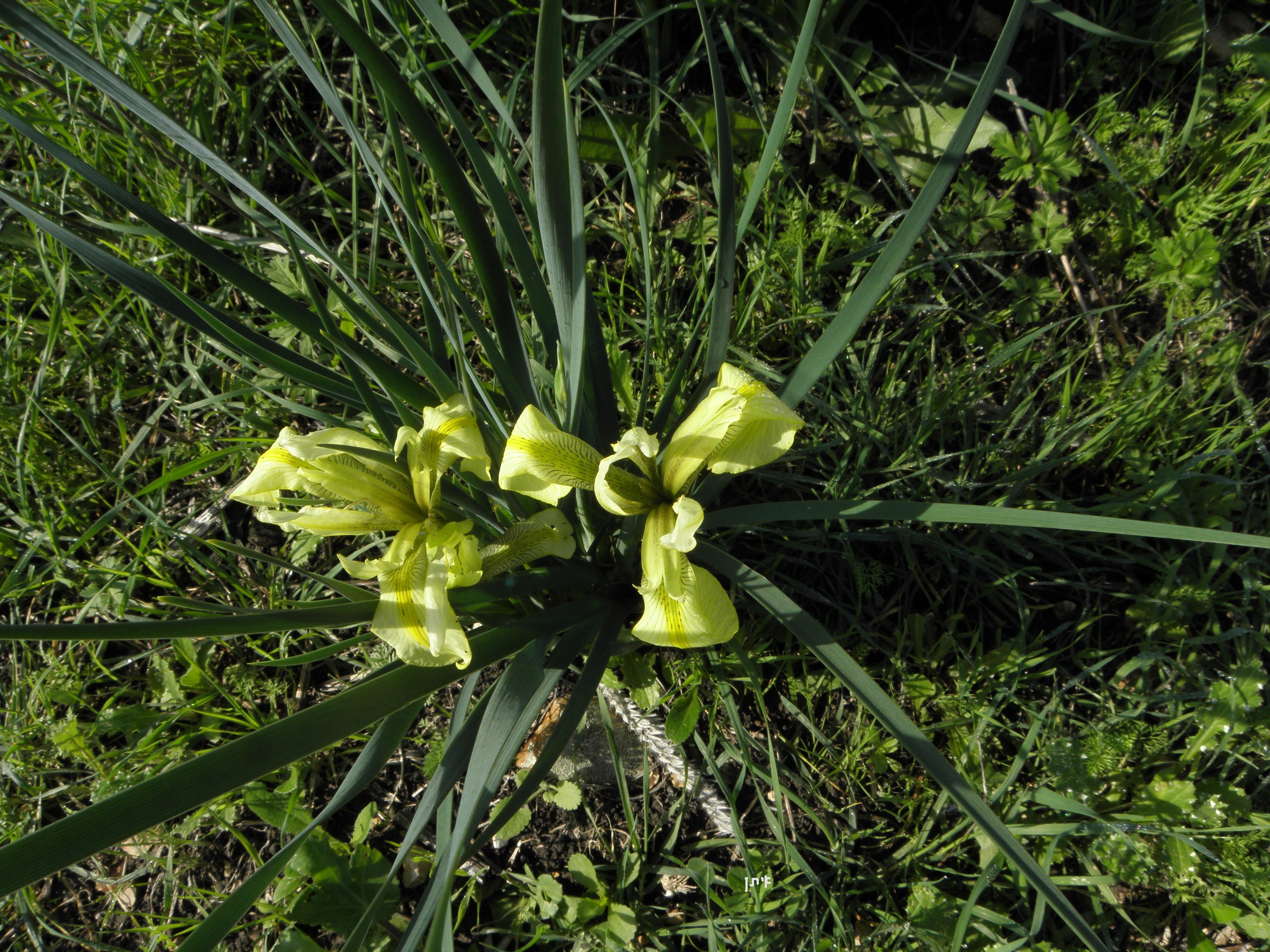

Conservation status
- Endangered (IUCN 3.1)

Scientific classification
- Kingdom: Plantae
- Clade: Embryophytes
- Clade: Tracheophytes
- Clade: Spermatophytes
- Clade: Angiosperms
- Clade: Monocots
- Order: Asparagales
- Family: Iridaceae
- Genus: Iris
- Subgenus: Iris subg. Limniris
- Section: Iris sect. Limniris
- Series: Iris ser. Syriacae
- Species: I. grant-duffii

Binomial name
- Iris grant-duffii Baker

Synonyms
- Iris aschersonii Foster; Iris melanostictae Bornm.

= Iris grant-duffii =

Species of flowering plant

Iris grant-duffii is a species in the genus Iris. It is also in the subgenus Limniris and in the series Syriacae. It is a rhizomatous perennial, from Lebanon, Israel, Syria, Turkey, Lebanon and Iraq, which has brown bristles/spines on the rhizome, long thin greyish green leaves, short stem carrying a single scented flower in shades of yellow.

== Description ==
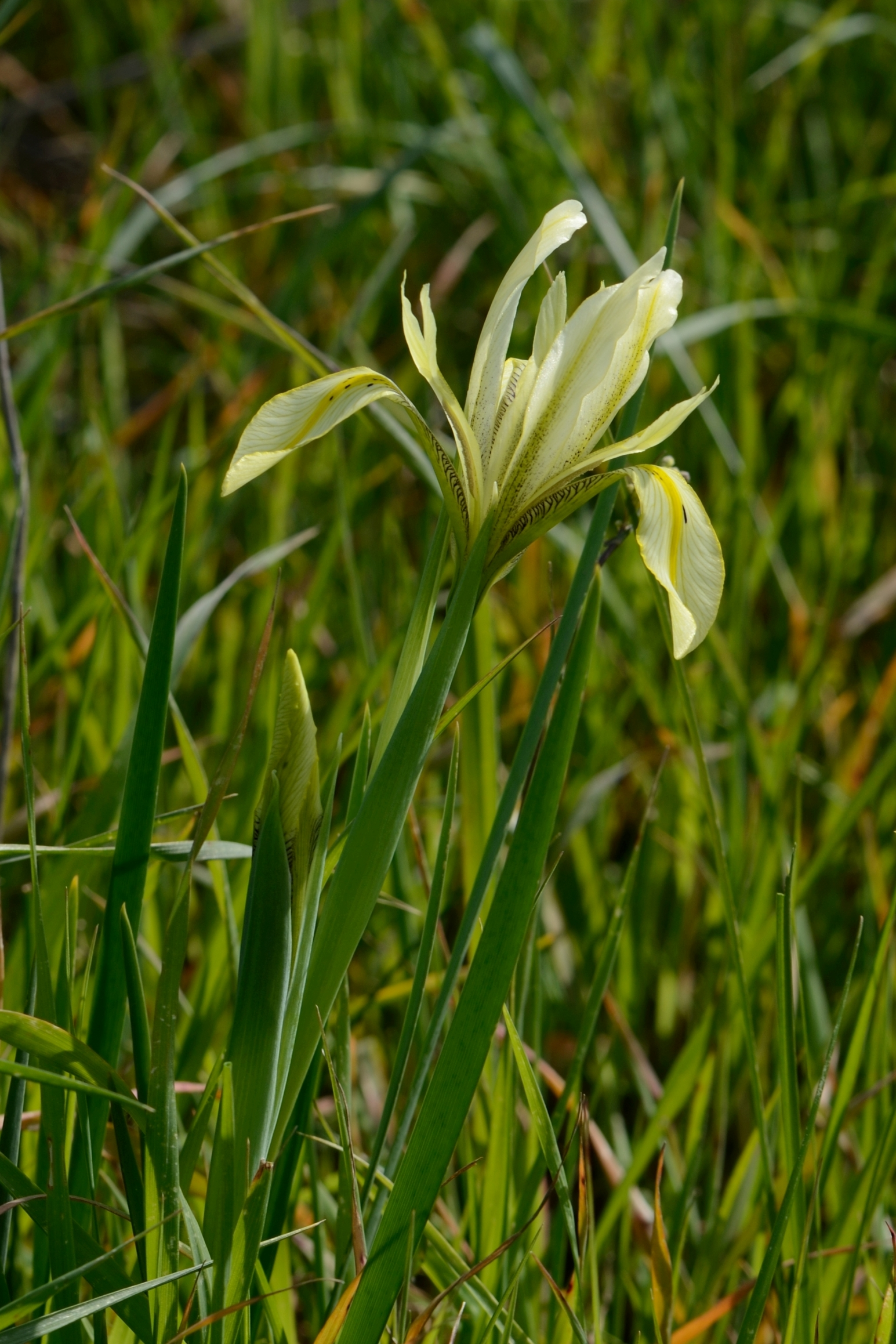
Iris grant duffii

Iris grant duffii is similar in form to two of the North American species of iris, Iris tenax and Iris douglasiana.

It has seedlings, that grow a small rhizome bud that is between a tuber and a bulb. At the first year of growth, the seedling bud is similar to a bulb of Iris reticulata. Later, the bud forms a short, stubby rhizome. The rhizome is made up of bands of growth, each band created by a seasons growth. Each growth band has remains of the leaves from the last season. These are very spiny. This makes holding the rhizomes very difficult and painful. It is thought that these brown bristles/spines are formed to protect the plants from being grazed on by animals.

The creeping rhizome, eventually makes large clumps of plants.

It has greyish green leaves,(that are slightly glaucous), which grow up to between 35–70 cm (14–28 in) long,), and 5–10 mm wide. There are up 6 leaves per stem, they are linear, flat and very clearly veined with a white margin along the edges. They emerge in early winter and reach their full length after two months.

The iris has a stem (flowering stalk) that grows up to between 15–35 cm (6–14 in) tall. The rounded, un-branched stems carry a single flower, which are slightly scented. The base of the stem can be rather swollen and is encircled by a truncate scariose (dry brown) sheath.

The iris flowers between April and May in the UK, late spring in Europe, but within Israel, it is between February (on the coastal plains) and April (on the Golan Heights). The flowers come in shades of yellow, from greenish yellow, yellow, to pale yellow. They are dotted black or have purple or lilac veins (or streaks). The flowers are generally 8 cm in diameter, with 6–7 cm long falls and 5–7 cm long standards. The blade has an orange signal patch.

It has a 7 mm long pale yellow perianth tube. It also has yellow/pale yellow styles (part of the flower holding the stigma) which are 4.5 cm long. The flower buds have green spathes which are paper-like.

The iris produces seed after the blooming period is over, in summer. The seed capsules and cylindrical and ellipsoid and the seeds are red-brown, rounded and tuberculate.

=== Biochemistry ===
As most irises are diploid, having two sets of chromosomes. This can be used to identify hybrids and classification of groupings. It has a chromosome count: 2n=24.

== Taxonomy ==
It has the common name of Grant Duff's Iris, and 'Jaffa Iris'.

It has the Hebrew name of איריס הביצות, meaning "Irus ha-bitzot" – the swamp iris, which comes from its native habitat of marshy areas.

It was first found in 1864, and specimens were collected by B. T. Lowne on the banks of the river Kishon in Israel. It was later found by Sir Mountstuart Elphinstone Grant Duff in the plain of Esdraelon (Jezreel Valley). It was then named after him as the ex-Governor of Madras.

It was published by Baker in his book Handbook of the Irideae (Aug–Nov 1892). It was later published in Curtis's Botanical Magazine Issue 124 in 1898, with a colour illustration, which was drawn from a plant flowered by W. E. Gumbleton in Queenstown in February 1897.

It was called a separate species by Brian Mathew in his book The Iris (1981) as Iris melanasticta Bornm (syn. 'Black spotted iris'); however, this is now regarded as a synonym of Iris grant duffii. It is one of only two species in the Syriacea series according to Mathew.

== Native ==
Iris grant duffi is native to Lebanon, Israel, Syria, Turkey, Lebanon and Iraq.

It is most common in Israel, found in Golan, Galilee, Upper Jordan valley, Northern valleys, Samarian mountains, Sharon, Kinnroth Valley (near River Jordan) and on the plains near Acre, Israel. It is found on Golan Heights growing with Romulea bulbocodium and Asphodeline lutea.

It prefers seasonally wet lands and swamps, including the flat marshy areas on the coastal plain and inland valleys. It is relatively resistant to dry conditions, and it can survive the desiccation of its habitats during the summer.

In a 1975 survey (by M. Agami and A. Dafni) of plants and animals, only plants of Iris grant-duffii were mentioned near the Nahal na'aman. But due to cultivation pressures on land uses (including farming and the use of pesticides – polluting the waterways), it is becoming increasingly rare and endangered.

== Cultivation ==
It is hardy to USDA Zone 4.

It is rare in cultivation in the UK, as it requires a bulb frame. To grow it successfully, the iris should have a minimum of 4 months of dryness in the summer and then kept away from winter dampness, but it needs plenty of water in the spring. It is best planted between September and October, in moist, rich soils.

Specimens of the iris can be found in the botanical garden of Tel Aviv University, Museum National D'historie Natrelle, and The Hebrew University of Jerusalem.
