= Moulins, Aisne =

Moulins
- Commune
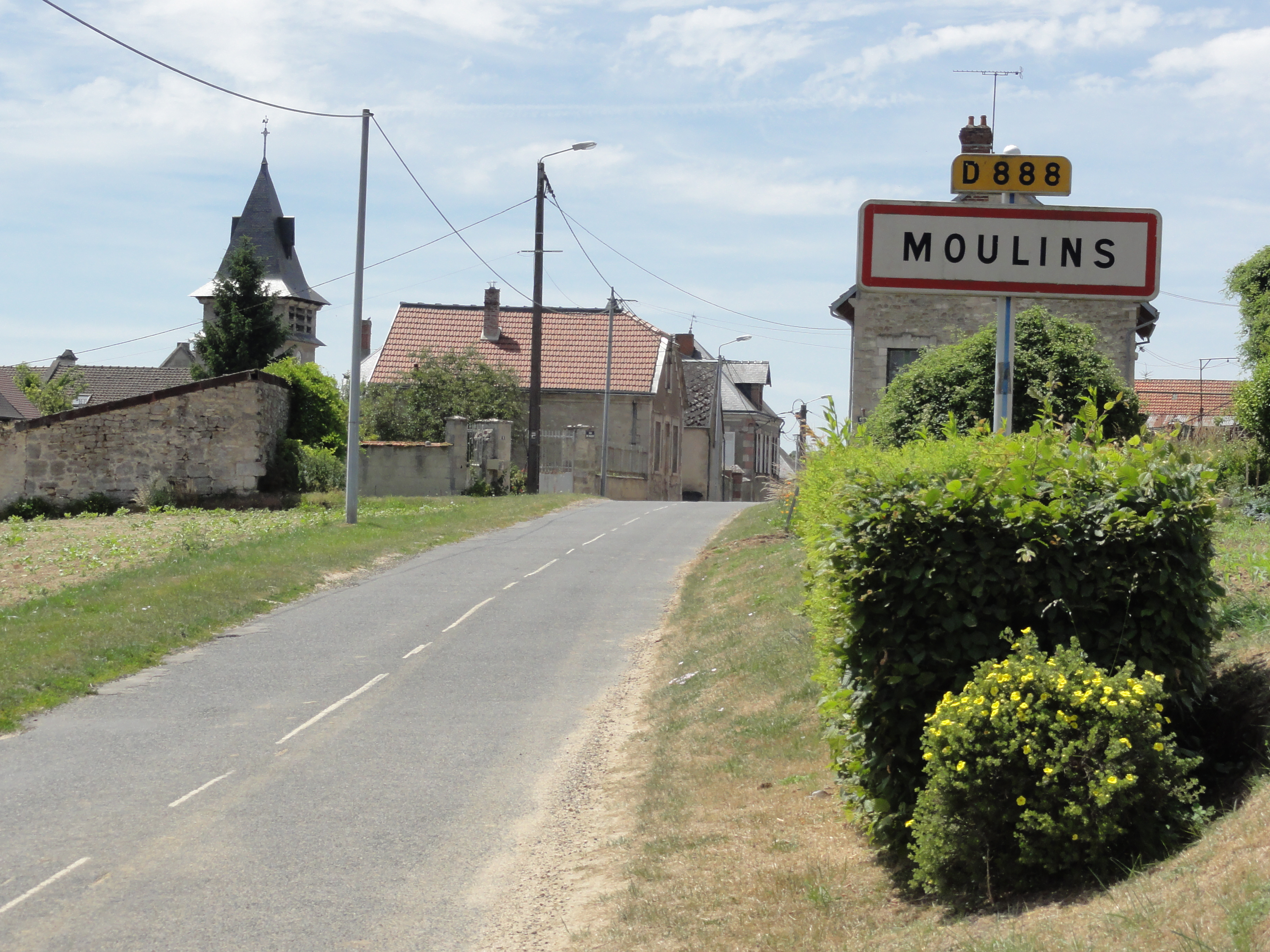
- The road into Moulins
- Location of Moulins
- Location within France Location within Hauts-de-France
- Coordinates: 49°25′17″N 3°41′10″E
- Country: France
- Region: Hauts-de-France
- Department: Aisne
- Arrondissement: Château-Thierry
- Canton: Villeneuve-sur-Aisne
- Intercommunality: Chemin des Dames

Government
  - Mayor (2026–32): Vincent Campiglio
- Area^{1}: 1.6 km^{2} (0.62 sq mi)
- Elevation: 50 m (160 ft)
- Highest elevation: 179 m (587 ft)
- Lowest elevation: 64 m (210 ft)
- Population (2023): 74
  - Density: 46/km^{2} (120/sq mi)
- Time zone: UTC+01:00 (CET)
  - Summer (DST): UTC+02:00 (CEST)
- INSEE/Postal code: 02530 /02160
- ^{1} French Land Register data, which excludes lakes, ponds, glaciers > 1 km^{2} (0.386 sq mi or 247 acres) and river estuaries.

Moulins (French pronunciation: [mulɛ̃]) is a commune in the Aisne department in Hauts-de-France in northern France.

== Population ==
Historical population
| Year | Pop. | ±% p.a. |
|---|---|---|
| 1968 | 111 | — |
| 1975 | 107 | −0.52% |
| 1982 | 89 | −2.60% |
| 1990 | 86 | −0.43% |
| 1999 | 81 | −0.66% |
| 2007 | 97 | +2.28% |
| 2012 | 95 | −0.42% |
| 2017 | 76 | −4.36% |
| 2023 | 74 | −0.44% |
Source: INSEE

== See also ==
- Communes of the Aisne department
