= William Huddleston (colonial administrator) =

British colonial administrator

Governor of Madras Presidency (acting)
- In office 24 May 1881 – 5 November 1881
- Governor General: George Robinson, 1st Marquess of Ripon
- Preceded by: William Patrick Adam
- Succeeded by: M. E. Grant Duff

Personal details
- Born: 1826
- Died: 1894 (aged 67–68)

William Huddleston, CSI (c. 1826–1894) was a British colonial administrator who acted as the Governor of Madras from 24 May 1881 to 5 November 1881.

He was made a CSI in 1882.

Preceded by William Patrick Adam	Governor of Madras (acting); 24 May 1881 - 5 November 1881	Succeeded by M. E. Grant Duff
