= Whitelaw Ainslie =

British surgeon and writer

Sir Whitelaw Ainslie FRSE (17 February 1767 – 29 April 1837) was a British surgeon and writer on materia medica, best known for his work as a surgeon in the employment of the East India Company in India. He published the first major English work on the medicinal plants of India in 1813.

== Biography ==
Ainslie was born in Duns, Berwickshire to Robert Ainslie (1734–1795) and Catharine Whitelaw. He joined the East India Company service as an assistant surgeon on 17 June 1788, and on his arrival in India was appointed garrison surgeon of Chingleput. On 17 October 1794 he was promoted to the grade of surgeon, having been two years previously transferred to Ganjam. In 1810 he was appointed superintending surgeon, the court of directors having approved his motives in drawing up a scheme to improve the health of the troops in India, whilst rejecting the plan proposed. He was named superintending surgeon of the southern division of the army (Madras) in 1814, and two years later the sum of six hundred guineas was awarded to him as a mark of the estimation in which his services were held by the court of directors.

On 21 June 1815 he resigned, having served twenty-seven years apparently without any furlough, and returned to England in the autumn of that year. During his residence in India he seems to have published the joint report mentioned below, a ‘Treatise upon Edible Vegetables,’ and the Materia Medica of Hindostan (1813) which was expanded into a two volume work in 1826. He wrote on elephantiasis in 1826 and smallpox in India and variolation practices in 1827. Keeping in view the miasma theory of his time, he wrote on the relations between climate and health. After his return to England, he wrote extensively. In 1835, in An Historical Sketch of the Introduction of Christianity into India, he refers to himself as 'verging towards the vale of years,’ the book being dedicated to his wife.

Ainslie was elected a Fellow of the Royal Society of Edinburgh in 1829 and was knighted in 1835. He died in London but is buried in the Grant-Duff mausoleum in the small churchyard of King Edward, Aberdeenshire.

== Family ==
He was married to Mary Cunninghame the daughter of Colonel James Cunninghame of Balbougie, Fife. Their only daughter Jane married James C. Grant-Duff.

== Works ==
He published the following works:

- Materia Medica of Hindostan, Madras, 1813.
- Materia Indica; or Some Account of those Articles which are employed by the Hindoos and other Eastern Nations in their Medicine, Arts, and Agriculture, London, 1826. (an amended edition of the above. Volume I Volume II)
- Clemenza, or the Tuscan Orphan; a tragic drama in five acts, Bath, 1822, 2nd edition, 1823.
- Observations on the Cholera Morbus of India, London, 1825. (A rejoinder to this tract was published by James Morison, the hygienist, in the same year.)
- Medical Observations, forming pp. 353–367 of vol. iii. of Hugh Murray's Historical and Descriptive Account of British India 1832, (vols. vi.–viii. in the Edinburgh Cabinet Library); new edition in 1844,
- An Historical Sketch of the Introduction of Christianity into India, Edinburgh, 1835, with A. Smith and M. Christy.
- Report on the Causes of the Epidemical Fever which prevailed in the Provinces of Coimbatore, Madeira, Dinigal, and Tinivelly, in 1809–10–11, London, 1816.
