= Francis Balfour (colonial administrator) =

British military officer and colonial administrator

Lieutenant-Colonel Francis Balfour CIE CVO CBE MC

Governor of Red Sea Province
- In office 1927–1928

Governor of Mongalla Province
- In office 1 March 1929 – 5 December 1930
- Preceded by: Arthur Wallace Skrine
- Succeeded by: Leonard Fielding Nalder

Personal details
- Born: Francis Cecil Campbell Balfour; 8 December 1884
- Died: 16 April 1965 (aged 80)
- Spouse: Phyllis Goschen
- Parent(s): Eustace Balfour; Lady Frances Campbell
- Relatives: Blanche Dugdale (sister); Arthur Balfour (uncle); George Campbell, 8th Duke of Argyll (maternal grandfather); Elizabeth Campbell, Duchess of Argyll (maternal grandmother)

Military service
- Allegiance: British Empire
- Battles/wars: World War I: Mesopotamian campaign; Siege of Najaf (1918)

Lieutenant-Colonel Francis Cecil Campbell Balfour (8 December 1884 – 16 April 1965) was a British military officer and colonial administrator.

== Background ==
The son of Colonel Eustace Balfour and his wife Lady Frances (née Campbell), Balfour was a nephew of Arthur Balfour, who was Prime Minister of the United Kingdom from July 1902 to December 1905. He was educated at Eton.

== Career ==
In 1906 he was appointed to the public works department of the Anglo-Egyptian Sudan, and in 1912 was appointed to the Sudan Political Service after the intervention of the Governor-General, Reginald Wingate.

Balfour joined the 6th Battalion, Royal Northumberland Fusiliers, where he gained the rank of Lieutenant-Colonel. During the First World War he fought in Mesopotamia between 1917 and 1919, taking a leading role in defeating a rebellion in Najaf.

From 1924 to 1926 he was Military Secretary to the Governor of Madras, George Goschen (whose daughter Phyllis he had married in 1920). From 1927 to 1928 he served as governor of the Red Sea Province of Sudan, and from 1929 to 1930 was Governor of the Mongalla Province of Sudan.

Balfour was decorated with the award of Order of the Nile (3rd class), the Military Cross and the award of Order of the Lion and the Sun of Persia (2nd class). He was invested as a Companion of the Order of the Indian Empire (1919), as a Commander of the Order of the British Empire (1931) and as a Commander of the Royal Victorian Order (1953).

He died on 16 April 1965 at the age of eighty.

== Private life ==
Balfour married Phyllis Goschen, daughter of George Goschen, 2nd Viscount Goschen, and his wife Lady Margaret (née Gathorne-Hardy; daughter of Gathorne Gathorne-Hardy, 1st Earl of Cranbrook), in 1920.

== Ancestry ==
Ancestors of Francis Balfour (colonial administrator)

8. James Balfour
4. James Maitland Balfour
9. Lady Eleanor Maitland
2. Eustace Balfour
10. James Gascoyne-Cecil, 2nd Marquess of Salisbury
5. Lady Blanche Gascoyne-Cecil
11. Frances Gascoyne
1. Francis Balfour
12. John Campbell, 7th Duke of Argyll
6. George Campbell, 8th Duke of Argyll
13. Joan Glassel
3. Lady Frances Campbell
14. George Sutherland-Leveson-Gower, 2nd Duke of Sutherland
7. Lady Elizabeth Sutherland-Leveson-Gower
15. the Hon. Harriet Howard
