= Lord Colin Campbell =

Scottish politician (1853–1895)

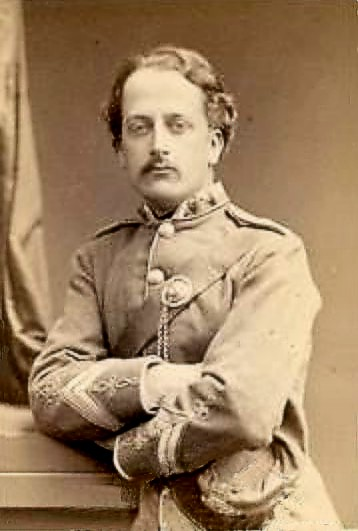
- Lord Colin Campbell (1890)

Member of Parliament for Argyllshire
- In office 1878-1885

Personal details
- Born: 9 March 1853 England
- Died: 18 June 1896 (aged 43) Bombay, India
- Party: Liberal Party
- Spouse: Gertrude Blood (m. 1881)
- Parents: George Campbell (father); Elizabeth Leveson-Gower (mother)
- Relatives: John Campbell (brother); Victoria Campbell (sister); Frances Balfour (sister); George Sutherland-Leveson-Gower (grandfather); John Campbell (grandfather)
- Education: St Andrews University; Trinity College, Cambridge
- Military career
- Branch: British Army
- Rank: Lieutenant
- Unit: 2nd Argyll Rifle Volunteers

Lord Colin Campbell (9 March 1853 – 18 June 1895) was a Scottish Liberal politician who sat in the House of Commons from 1878 to 1885.

== Biography ==
Campbell was the fifth son of George Campbell, 8th Duke of Argyll, and his wife Lady Elizabeth Georgiana, daughter of George Sutherland-Leveson-Gower, 2nd Duke of Sutherland. He was educated at Eton College, St Andrews University and Trinity College, Cambridge. He entered Middle Temple in 1875 and was a lieutenant in the 2nd Argyll Rifle Volunteers. He entered Parliament for Argyllshire in 1878, a seat he held until 1885. A number of Campbell's constituents became disenchanted with him, adopting a parody of a traditional song about the Campbell family: "But their aim, and their claim, which are one and the same,/Are founded in falsehoods of sand, you know./The Campbells are cunning, oho, oho .." One consequence of Campbell's unpopularity was that his brother, the Marquess of Lorne, Queen Victoria's son-in-law, who had previously been MP for Argyllshire and was seeking to return to politics after a spell as Governor General of Canada, felt compelled to find a seat outside Scotland. He stood as Liberal candidate for Hampstead in 1885, but lost.

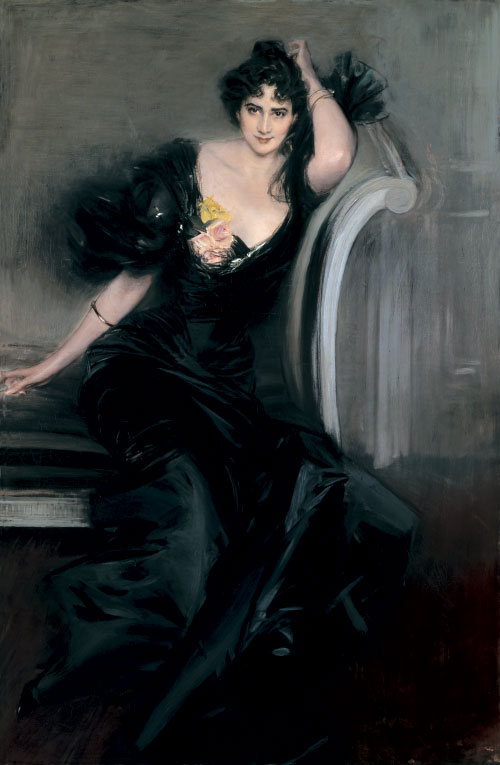
Lady Colin Campbell (1897) by Giovanni Boldini

Campbell married Gertrude Elizabeth Blood (1857–1911), daughter of Irish landowner Edmund Maghlin Blood, in 1881. They had no children and were separated in 1884, partially because of Gertrude Blood's firm belief that Campbell had infected her with syphilis. An acrimonious legal battle followed in 1886, resulting in Gertrude's being denied a divorce. The notorious trial involved accusations of adultery from both sides, and visits by the jury to the Campbell's London home at 79 Cadogan Place to verify testimony about what the butler saw through a keyhole of Lady Colin Campbell's encounters with other men. The couple remained married until Lord Colin's death in Bombay in 1895 from syphilis.

Gertrude Elizabeth became a well-known socialite, writer and wit. She died in November 1911.

Parliament of the United Kingdom
Preceded by The Marquess of Lorne	Member of Parliament for Argyllshire; 1878–1885	Succeeded by Donald Horne Macfarlane
