= The Marriage of Princess Louise =

Painting by Sydney Prior Hall

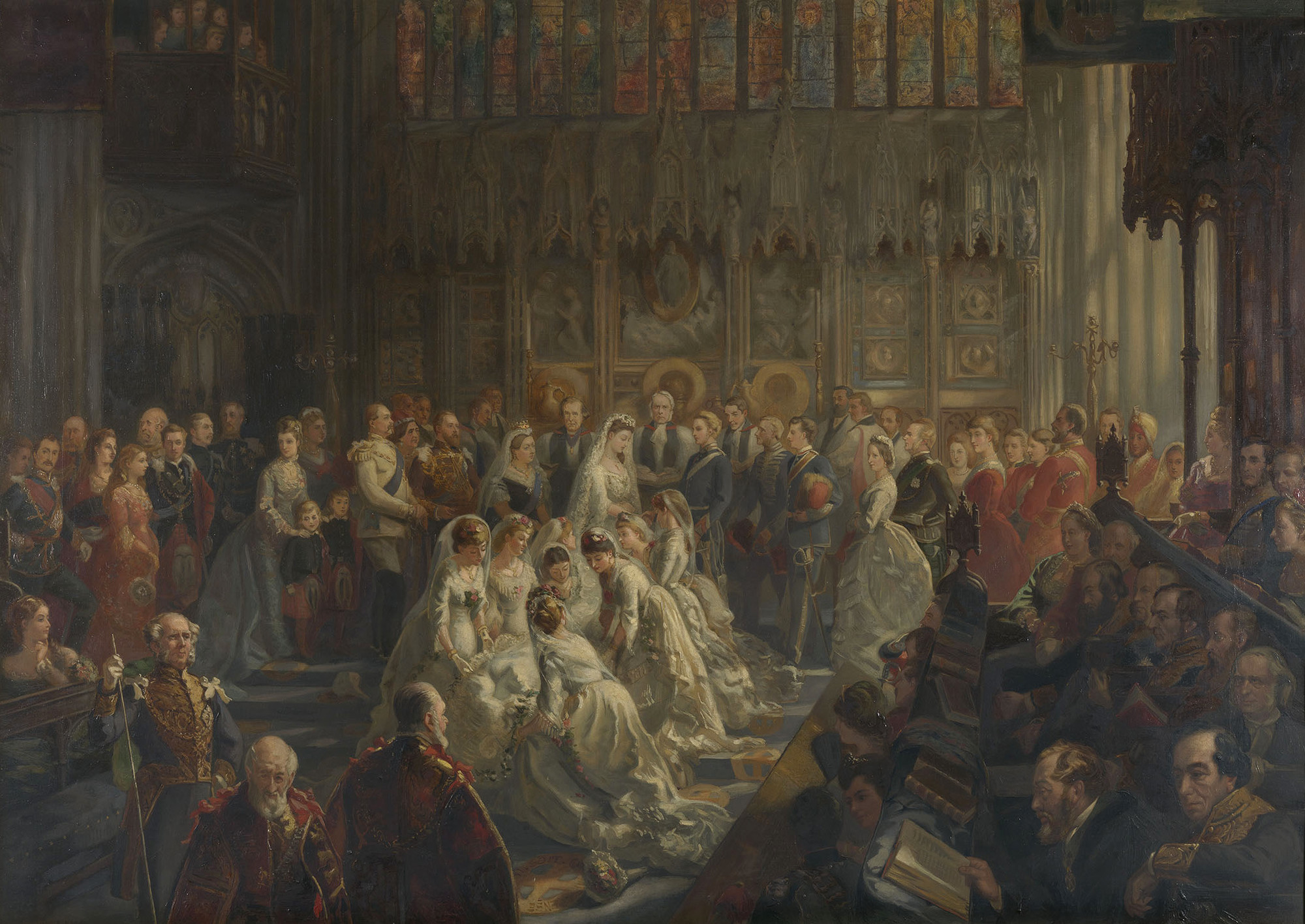
- Artist: Sydney Prior Hall
- Year: 1878–79
- Type: Oil on canvas, historical painting
- Dimensions: 72.0 cm × 100.3 cm (28.3 in × 39.5 in)
- Location: Royal Collection

The Marriage of Princess Louise is an oil on canvas history painting by the British artist Sydney Prior Hall, from 1878–79.

== History and description ==
It depicts the wedding of Princess Louise of the United Kingdom and John Campbell, Marquess of Lorne in St George's Chapel, Windsor Castle, on 21 March 1871.

Louise was the fourth daughter of Queen Victoria and Prince Albert. John was the eldest son of George Campbell, 8th Duke of Argyll, and the former Lady Elizabeth Sutherland-Leveson-Gower. No marriage between a daughter of a monarch and a British subject had been given official recognition since 1515, when Charles Brandon, 1st Duke of Suffolk, married King Henry VIII's sister Mary. Queen Victoria described the occasion as "the most popular act of my reign".

The painting that exists in the Royal Collection is a copy of the original one produced by Sydney Prior Hall. Though it might be prepared by Hall himself, the quality of the copy also suggests that it might have been executed by a collaborator.
