= Lady Victoria Campbell =

British philanthropist (1854–1910)

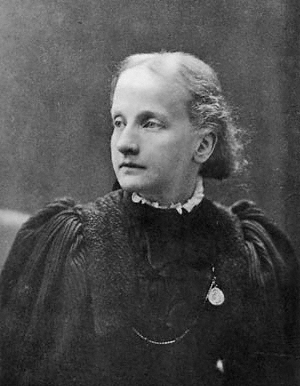
- Lady Victoria, c. 1895
- Born: 22 May 1854; Carlton House, London
- Died: 6 July 1910 (aged 56); Edinburgh
- Buried: Liberton Churchyard, Edinburgh
- Father: George Campbell, 8th Duke of Argyll
- Mother: Lady Elizabeth Leveson-Gower
- Occupation: Philanthropist

Lady Victoria Campbell (22 May 1854 – 6 July 1910) was a British philanthropist. She was born to two of the largest landowners in Scotland, being the third daughter of George Campbell, 8th Duke of Argyll and his wife Lady Elizabeth Leveson-Gower. A childhood bout of poliomyelitis caused paralysis and required her to wear leg braces for the rest of her life.

In 1882, Lady Victoria experienced a "second consecration" and dedicated the rest of her life to helping those who lived on the islands throughout Argyll. She frequently visited the island of Tiree, where she championed social and religious organisations, and moved there in 1891. She also anonymously promoted the island, sending details of the plight of islanders in regular letters to the British press. In 1911 Victoria's sister Frances Balfour published a posthumous biography of her.

== Family and early life ==
Lady Victoria Campbell was born at Carlton House, London on 22 May 1854, the third daughter and eighth child of George Campbell, 8th Duke of Argyll by his first wife Lady Elizabeth Leveson-Gower. As such, the new baby was a member of the Campbell and Leveson-Gower families, two of the largest landowners in Scotland. She was named after Queen Victoria, the reigning monarch at the time of her birth. Her maternal grandmother, the Duchess of Sutherland, was the Queen's friend and often held the position Mistress of the Robes. She was the only one of the twelve Campbell siblings who never married. Her relatives by marriage included Princess Louise, who was married to her eldest brother John.

At the age of five Lady Victoria contracted poliomyelitis, which caused paralysis and required her to wear leg braces for the remainder of her life. From 1859 to 1868, her health required her to spend most of the year in London and Brighton, near her orthopaedist Matthias Roth. Victoria was often separated from her immediate family during these periods, though she was looked after by her unmarried aunt Emily MacNeill and her lifelong servant and companion Elizabeth Knowles. Despite this separation, Victoria was particularly close to her sister Frances Balfour, who in 1868 described Victoria's bedroom as "the centre of the fun and mischief that was going on in the family circle".

Victoria underwent multiple treatments and surgeries to alleviate the paralysis in her legs, and after physical therapy she was eventually able to use crutches and walking sticks. Her sister Frances later observed that because Victoria's ailments occurred from an early age, it became "second nature" to cope and she rarely spoke of them. In 1868, at the age of 14 Victoria developed a lung abscess which almost caused her death; she continued to have chest infections for the rest of her life. That same year, the Duchess had a stroke which led to ten years of being nursed by her third daughter. After the Duchess's death in 1878, the strain of the many years of nursing may have been the cause of Victoria's nervous breakdown in 1878–79. Victoria then oversaw the management of her father's households until his remarriage in 1881.

== Philanthropy ==
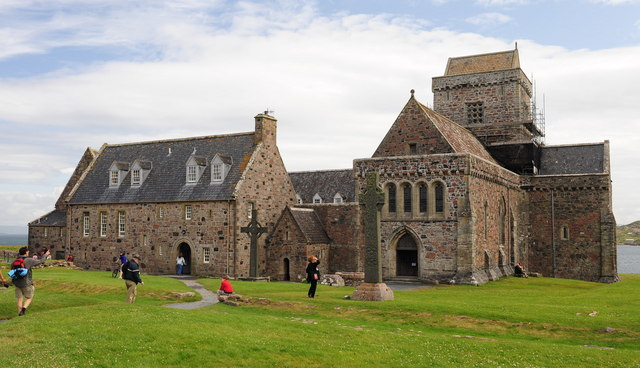
Iona Abbey, where Lady Victoria experienced a "second consecration".

Despite her limited ability to walk, Victoria frequently visited poverty-stricken families on the island of Iona. During a visit to Iona Abbey in 1882, Victoria experienced a "second consecration" and thereafter dedicated herself to helping those who lived on the islands throughout Argyll. A plaque was later installed in the abbey that reads, "In this church and by this window Victoria, daughter of George, eighth Duke of Argyll, dedicated her life to the glory of God in the service of the people of these islands."

In 1885 she began taking lessons in Gaelic, which was spoken on all of the islands; she sometimes taught Bible classes in the language. She also supported the creation of art and crafts that were inspired by Celtic culture, and participated in a resurgence of interest in Celtic Christianity in Argyll; the Celtic craft entrepreneurs Alexander and Euphemia Ritchie of Iona were two of her pupils.

=== Tiree ===
Lady Victoria first viewed the island of Tiree in 1878, when travelling on her father's yacht. In 1886, she learned of a dispute between her father and the residents of Tiree, who had suffered recent economic hardship. The islanders wished for a farm to be converted into crofts, but the duke instead leased it to someone else. Local citizens prevented the new tenant from taking up the farm, causing at least eight men to be arrested. The historian Joan B. Huffman describes this event as "life-altering" for Victoria, as she increased her visits to the island and later moved there in 1891.

On Tiree, Victoria championed social and religious organisations such as the YWCA, and organised soup kitchens. She also oversaw training for both men and women; the former learned crafts such as woodcarving while female residents were trained in needlework and lace-making. Lady Victoria promoted Tiree under the pseudonym 'Hebridean', sending details on the plight of islanders in regular letters to the British press. She was held in high esteem by residents, who admired her determination to reach the island even when bad weather made the journey dangerous.

Near the end of her life, Victoria was instrumental in securing the construction of a new pier for Tiree. Travel to the island could be difficult and dangerous, as there was no adequate pier to gain access. Residents had repeatedly petitioned her father for help, only to be met with refusal; the duke decided he would not be the one to solely fund its construction, despite the danger travelling to Tiree meant for his daughter. A new pier was only built after his death; Victoria ultimately worked for twenty years to secure its construction, which occurred shortly after her death. She died on 6 July 1910 of influenza and pneumonia in Edinburgh, and was buried in Liberton Churchyard. In 1911 her sister Frances published a posthumous biography of Victoria.

== Ancestors ==
Ancestors of Lady Victoria Campbell

8. John Campbell, 5th Duke of Argyll
4. John Campbell, 7th Duke of Argyll
9. Elizabeth Gunning, 1st Baroness Hamilton of Hameldon
2. George Campbell, 8th Duke of Argyll
10. John Glassel
5. Joan Glassel
11. Helen Buchan
1. Lady Victoria Campbell
12. George Leveson-Gower, 1st Duke of Sutherland
6. George Sutherland-Leveson-Gower, 2nd Duke of Sutherland
13. Elizabeth Gordon, 19th Countess of Sutherland
3. Lady Elizabeth Sutherland-Leveson-Gower
14. George Howard, 6th Earl of Carlisle
7. Lady Harriet Howard
15. Lady Georgiana Cavendish
