= Lady Frances Balfour =

British aristocrat, author, and suffragist (1858–1931)

- Balfour in 1919
- Born: Frances Campbell; 22 February 1858; Kensington, London, England
- Died: 25 February 1931 (aged 73); London, England
- Organization: National Union of Women's Suffrage Societies (NUWSS)
- Known for: Women's rights activism and authorship
- Political party: Whig until 1886; Liberal Unionists
- Spouse: Eustace Balfour (m. 1879; died 1911)
- Children: 5, including Blanche and Francis
- Parent(s): George Campbell, 8th Duke of Argyll; Lady Elizabeth Sutherland-Leveson-Gower
- Relatives: John Campbell, 9th Duke of Argyll (brother); Lord Colin Campbell (brother); Lady Victoria Campbell (sister); George Sutherland-Leveson-Gower, 2nd Duke of Sutherland (maternal grandfather); Harriet Sutherland-Leveson-Gower, Duchess of Sutherland (maternal grandmother)

Lady Frances Balfour (née Campbell; 22 February 1858 – 25 February 1931) was a British aristocrat, biographer, writer, and suffragist. She was one of the highest-ranking members of the British aristocracy to assume a leadership role in the Women's suffrage campaign in the United Kingdom. Balfour was a member of the executive committee of the National Society for Women's Suffrage (NUWSS) from 1896 to 1919. As a non-violent suffragist, she was opposed to the militant actions of the Women's Social and Political Union (WSPU).

== Family and early life ==
Frances Campbell was born on 22 February 1858 at Argyll Lodge in Kensington, London, England. She was the tenth child of British Liberal politician and Scottish peer George Campbell, 8th Duke of Argyll, and his wife, Lady Elizabeth Sutherland-Leveson-Gower (eldest daughter of George Sutherland-Leveson-Gower, 2nd Duke of Sutherland and Harriet Sutherland-Leveson-Gower, Duchess of Sutherland). Her siblings included John Campbell, 9th Duke of Argyll, Lord Colin Campbell and Lady Victoria Campbell.

Lady Frances Campbell had a hip joint disease and from early childhood was in constant pain and walked with a limp. Her parents were deeply religious and involved in several different campaigns for social reform. She reportedly helped with these campaigns as a child, for example by knitting garments to be sent to the children of former slaves after slavery was formally banned by the government within the British territories in 1833.

In February 1877, she slipped into the gallery of the House of Lords to listen to her father give a speech. She became a regular attendee to the Ladies Gallery in Parliament, attending major debates over Ireland, South Africa, education and church policy.

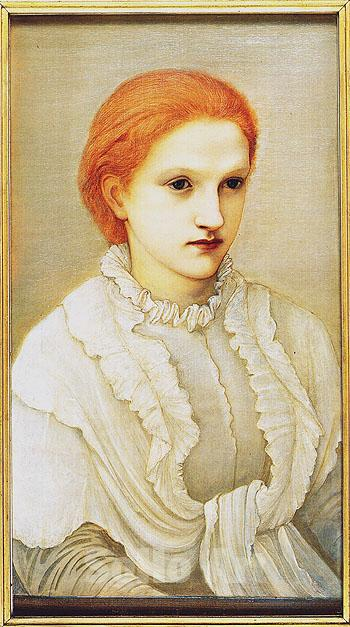
Painting by Edward Burne-Jones, 1880

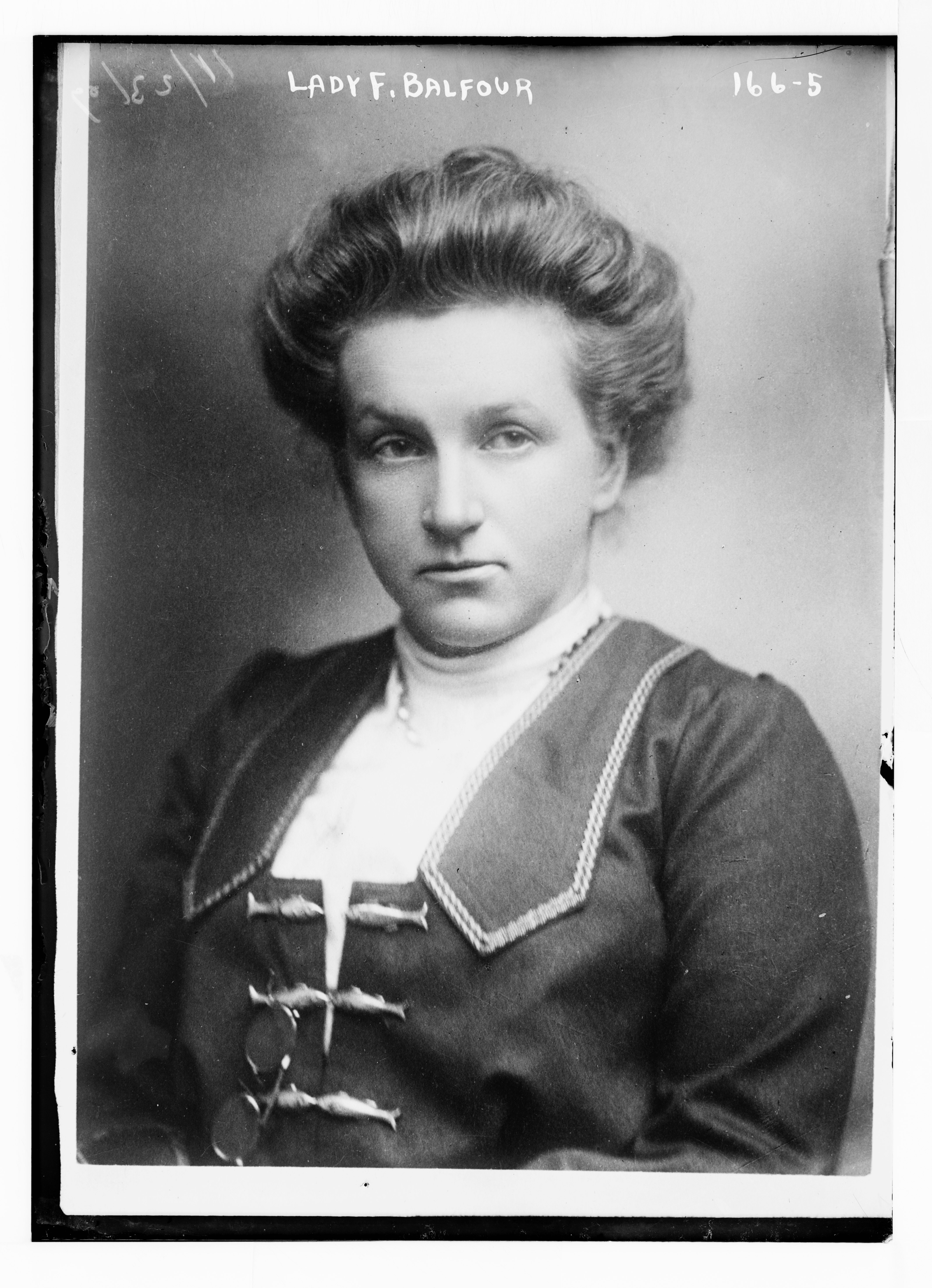
Portrait photograph of Lady Balfour

In 1879, she married Eustace Balfour, a London-based Scottish architect. Eustace's uncle, Robert Gascoyne-Cecil, 3rd Marquess of Salisbury, had served three terms as Britain's prime minister. Her brother-in-law, Arthur Balfour, was also a Conservative British prime minister from 1902 to 1905. However, in opposition to the Conservative politics of her husband's family, Balfour, along with both her parents, supported Liberal statesman William Ewart Gladstone and his government when she was a young woman. Lady Balfour and her husband never overcame these political differences and spent less and less time together. Hartley wrote that theirs was "not a particularly happy marriage." Despite this, the Balfours had five children:

- Blanche Elizabeth Campbell Dugdale (1880–1948), who married Edgar Dugdale in 1902. She became a biographer of her uncle the Prime Minister Arthur Balfour and noted Zionist
- Francis Cecil Campbell Balfour (1884–1965), who became a colonial Governor in Sudan in the 1920s
- Oswald Herbert Campbell Balfour (1894–1953), Military Secretary to the Governor General of Canada, 1921–23
- Joan Eleanor Campbell Balfour (died 1939)
- Alison Catherine Campbell Balfour (died 3 September 1955)

Her husband Eustace Balfour died on 14 February 1911. She survived her husband by 20 years.

== Suffrage ==
Lady Balfour was one of the highest-ranking members of the aristocracy to have a leadership role in the British women's suffrage campaign. She began her work for women's suffrage in 1889, when she became the constitutionalists' main liaison with Parliament. She was present in Parliament when a private members suffrage bill passed a second reading by 230 votes to 159 votes, a majority of 71, although the bill did not advance as the government would not grant parliamentary time.

In 1897, Lady Balfour became a member of the executive committee of the newly formed National Union of Women's Suffrage Societies (NUWSS), whose President was Millicent Garrett Fawcett. Lady Balfour served the NUWSS executive committee from its inception until some women got the vote in 1918. Lady Balfour and Fawcett also founded a women’s Liberal Unionist organisation.

In 1899, Lady Balfour addressed the Political Section of the Second International Congress of Women on the topic of "Women's Status in Local Government." She led the suffragist Mud March demonstration on 9 February 1907, alongside Fawcett.

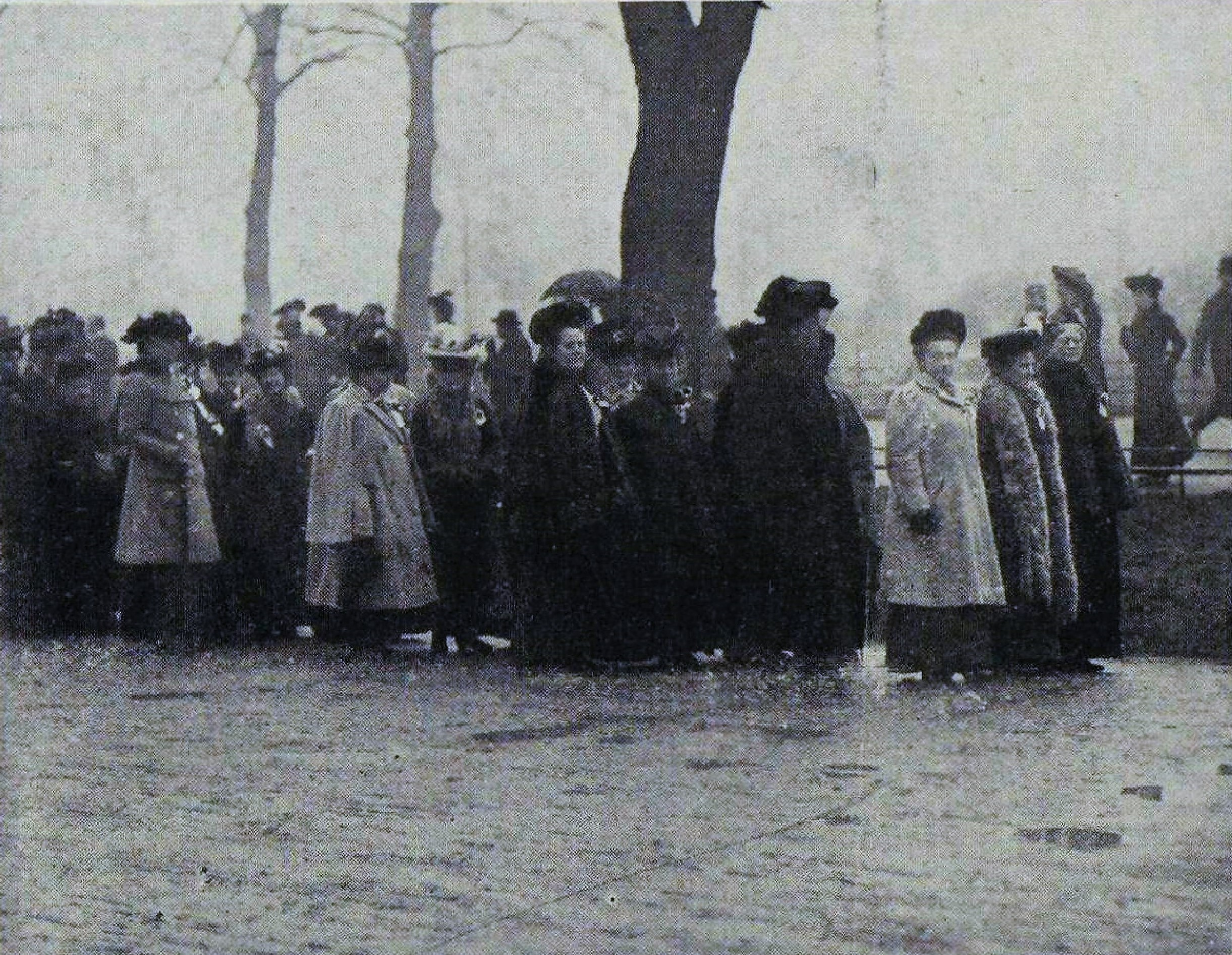
At the head of the 9 February 1907 Mud March (left to right): Lady Balfour in the light coat, Millicent Garrett Fawcett and Jane Maria Strachey, from The Illustrated London News

Lady Balfour was also the President of the London Society of Women's Suffrage, the largest single suffrage group in Britain, from 1896 to 1919. In addition, she served as President of the Lyceum Club, which rendered services to professional women, from 1903 to 1915. When her work for votes for women was almost over, Frances joined the National Council of Women in 1917, and served as president from 1921 to 1923. In 1910, Lady Balfour was a member of the "Royal Commission upon the Law of Divorce and its Administration."

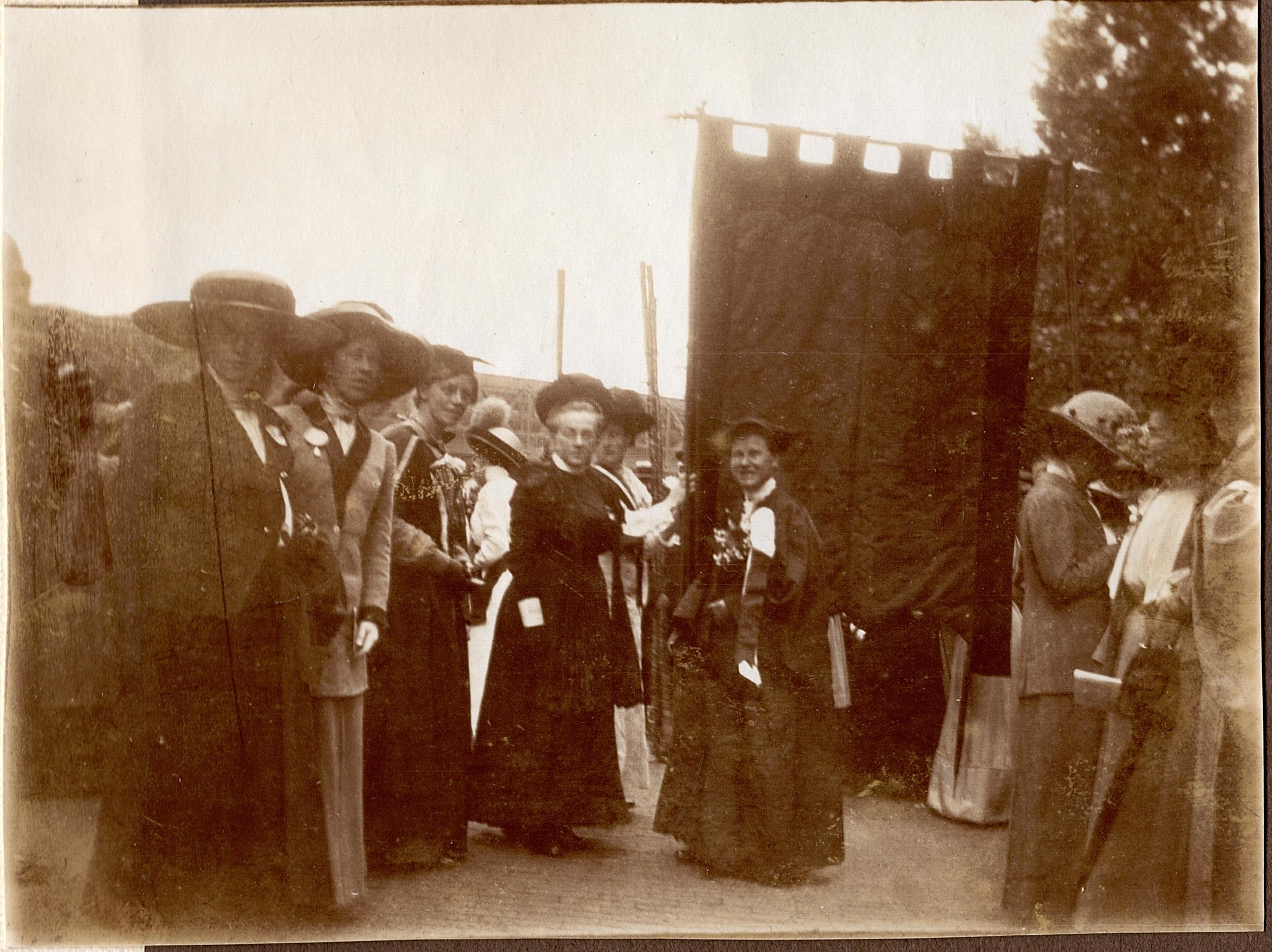
Millicent Fawcett and Lady Balfour at the Women's Coronation Procession on 17 June 1911

Lady Balfour wrote political commentary in the monthly magazine National Review under the pseudonym "Grille." She was joint editor of Women and Progress with Nora Vynne. The magazine was dedicated to achieving equal rights for men and women. They were happy to see younger women excluded from having the vote, as long as it applied equally to young men as well. The magazine appeared to be about to be a success when shortage of funds obliged it to fold in June 1914. Today the magazine serves as a source of early suffrage history.

Lady Balfour published six books, writing biographies, including of her friend Dr. Elsie Inglis. She completed her two-volume autobiography Ne Obliviscaris (Dinna Forget) in 1930.

== Lyceum Club ==
The writer Constance Smedley had decided to start a new type of club for women. Another founder, Jessie Trimble, proposed that the new club be called the Lyceum Club, and the new committee arranged for Smedley to meet Lady Balfour. The committee had decided to extend their net for new members from writers, to professional women and even the daughters or wives of prominent men. In 1903, Balfour agreed to lead the new club and served as their chair until 1915. Her vice chair was Enid Moberly Bell, a writer and headmistress.

== Death ==
Lady Balfour died in London on 25 February 1931 from bronchial pneumonia and heart failure, and was buried at Whittingehame, the Balfour family home in East Lothian, Scotland.

== Publications ==
- Dr Elsie Inglis (1920)
- The Life of George, Fourth Earl of Aberdeen (1923)
- Lady Victoria Campbell: a memoir (1911)
- A Memoir of Lord Balfour of Burleigh, KT. (1924)
- Dr MacGregor of St Cuthberts: A Memoir (1912)
- Life and Letters if the Reverend James MacGregor (1912)
- Ne Obliviscaris. Dinna Forget. (1930)
- In Memoriam the Lady Frances Balfour, 1881-1931 (Newspaper cuttings compiled by the Committee of the Travellers' Aid Society (1931)

== Distinctions and legacy ==
- Lady Balfour received honorary degrees from the University of Durham (DLitt 1919) and from the University of Edinburgh (LLD 1921)
- Lady Balfour's name and picture (and those of 58 other women's suffrage supporters) are on the plinth of the statue of Millicent Fawcett in Parliament Square, London, unveiled in 2018.
- Also in 2018, Lady Balfour's diaries were exhibited by the National Records of Scotland (NRS) at the General Register House, Edinburgh.

Non-profit organization positions
Preceded by Maud Palmer, Countess of Selborne	President of the National Council of Women of Great Britain & Ireland; 1921–1923	Succeeded by Mrs George Morgan
