= Elizabeth Leveson-Gower =

Elizabeth Leveson-Gower may refer to:

- Elizabeth Leveson-Gower, Duchess of Sutherland (1765–1839)
- Elizabeth Georgiana Leveson-Gower (1824 – 1878), British noblewoman and abolitionist
