= Eustace Balfour =

Scottish architect and officer in the Volunteer Force (1854-1911)

Colonel Eustace James Anthony Balfour
- Balfour in the 1890s
- Born: 8 June 1854; Whittingehame, East Lothian, Scotland
- Died: 14 February 1911 (aged 56); Whittingehame, East Lothian, Scotland
- Education: Harrow School
- Alma mater: Trinity College, Cambridge
- Occupation: Architect
- Spouse: Lady Frances Campbell (m. 1879)
- Children: 5, including Blanche and Francis
- Parents: James Maitland Balfour (father); Lady Blanche Mary Harriet Gascoyne-Cecil (mother)

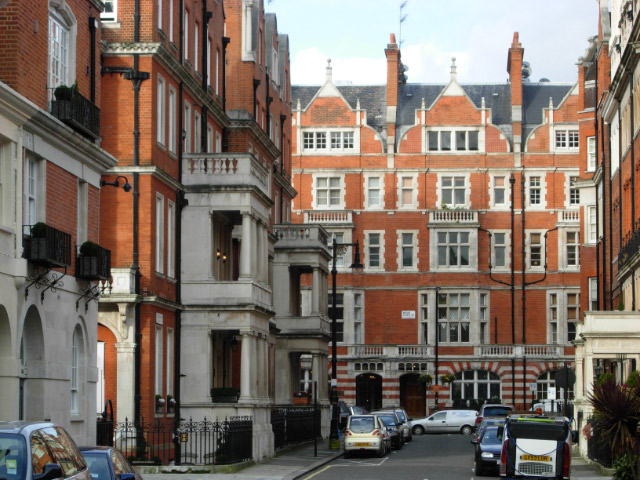
Balfour Place in the Mayfair district of London, designed by and named after Eustace Balfour

Colonel Eustace James Anthony Balfour (8 June 1854 – 14 February 1911) was a London-based Scottish architect. The brother of one British Prime Minister and nephew of another, his career was built on family connections. His mother was the daughter of a Marquess, and his wife Frances, a noted suffragist, was the daughter of a Duke. Frances's sister in-law was Princess Louise, daughter of the reigning Queen Victoria.

Balfour's initial work was on English and Scottish country houses, but he won only one major commission in this field. However, his appointment as surveyor of the Grosvenor Estate in London gave him architectural control over much of Mayfair and Belgravia in the 1890s and 1900s, and the opportunity to design many buildings himself.

Balfour was a senior officer of the Volunteer Force in London. His outspokenness on military matters was a factor in his appointment as an aide-de-camp to King Edward VII.

A fastidious and somewhat withdrawn individual, Balfour succumbed to alcoholism in his fifties. This brought about his early death.

== Early life ==
Balfour was born at Whittingehame House in East Lothian, the youngest of five sons of James Maitland Balfour and his wife Lady Blanche Mary Harriet Gascoyne-Cecil, daughter of James Gascoyne-Cecil, 2nd Marquess of Salisbury. His paternal grandfather James Balfour was a nabob who had made the family's fortune as a contractor supplying the Royal Navy in India and became a Tory Member of Parliament (MP), while his mother's father was a Conservative cabinet minister in the 1850s. Her brother, Robert Gascoyne-Cecil, 3rd Lord Salisbury, was three times Prime Minister before being succeeded in 1902 by Eustace's elder brother Arthur Balfour.

Eustace Balfour was educated at Harrow and at Trinity College, Cambridge, where he graduated in 1873. He then studied architecture under Basil Champneys, the designer of Newnham College, Cambridge, before setting up his own practice in 1879, with an office in Addison Road, North Kensington which was also his home until his death.

On 12 May 1879 he wed Lady Frances Campbell, the fifth daughter and tenth of twelve children of George Campbell, 8th Duke of Argyll. The couple had met at a ball given in London by Lord and Lady Goschen, and married soon afterwards in St John's Presbyterian Church in London. Frances's father was shocked at their haste. Out of respect for Balfour's mother, who had died in 1878, the wedding was modest, with no formal meal and no honeymoon.

== Architecture ==
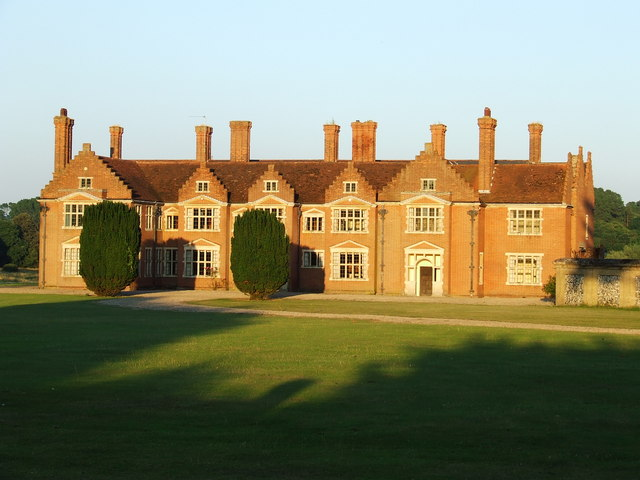
Ampton Hall in Suffolk, rebuilt in the 1880s to the design of Balfour & Turner

Balfour's first years of architectural practice consisted of small projects for family and friends. These included the restoration of Inveraray Castle for his father-in-law the Duke of Argyll, an extension to his brother Arthur's hunting lodge Strathconan House in Ross-shire, and the church of St Mary Magdalene in the hamlet of Hatfield Hyde. The church, which is now in Welwyn Garden City, was originally known as Hyde Chapel. Built as a chapel of ease within the parish of Hatfield for Balfour's uncle the Marquis of Salisbury, it became the parish church of Hatfield Hyde in 1928.

In 1885, Balfour began a professional partnership with Hugh Thackeray Turner, which lasted until Balfour's death. Balfour had been a member of the Society for the Protection of Ancient Buildings since his undergraduate days in Cambridge, and Turner was the Society's secretary. Together the two men were engaged to rebuild Ampton Hall in Suffolk, which had been destroyed by fire Their design, in a restrained Jacobean style, was Balfour's only major country house commission.

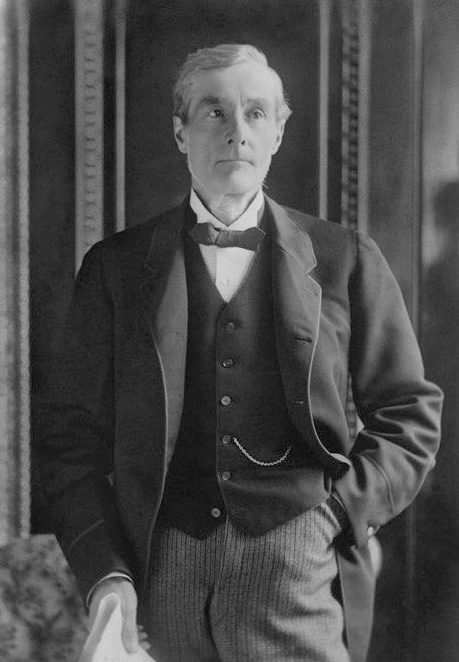
Hugh Grosvenor, 1st Duke of Westminster, who employed Eustace Balfour as surveyor of the Grosvenor Estate

Work was scarce after Ampton's completion in 1889, and in 1890 Balfour applied for the post of surveyor for the 1st Duke of Westminster's Grosvenor Estate, to succeed Thomas Cundy. He seemed unlikely to be selected, but Frances made a direct approach to the Duke (who was also her uncle), and he got the job. Balfour's social standing appears to have been a significant factor in his appointment. He was the son-in-law of a Duke, nephew of a Marquess, and his wife was the sister-in-law of Queen Victoria's 4th daughter Princess Louise (who had married her oldest brother John in 1871). Balfour had a strong sense of social class, and Frances Balfour later described the 1st Duke of Westminster as having run the estate "not as today on commercial lines, but more as a Principality". Even so, his brother Gerald's wife Lady Elizabeth Balfour noted that when the surveyor called on the Duke in his professional role he was "never offered a chair and never expected one".

The post involved a lot of design work for Balfour, who seems to have been able to take whatever commissions he wanted, often delegating them to Turner. In the 1890s, Balfour and Turner appear to have been the most prolific designers of private houses on the estate, and in 1892 Balfour was made a Fellow of the Royal Institute of British Architects. Their own work included most of the wholly redeveloped Balfour Place in Mayfair, formerly known as Portugal Street and renamed for the architect.

Balfour also supervised projects which were contracted to other designers. The Duke favoured the domestic revival style of architecture, and particularly insisted on red brick for dwelling houses. Balfour, who deplored the previously fashionable Gothic revivalism, laid down strict architectural guidelines, sometimes even redesigning the work of others.

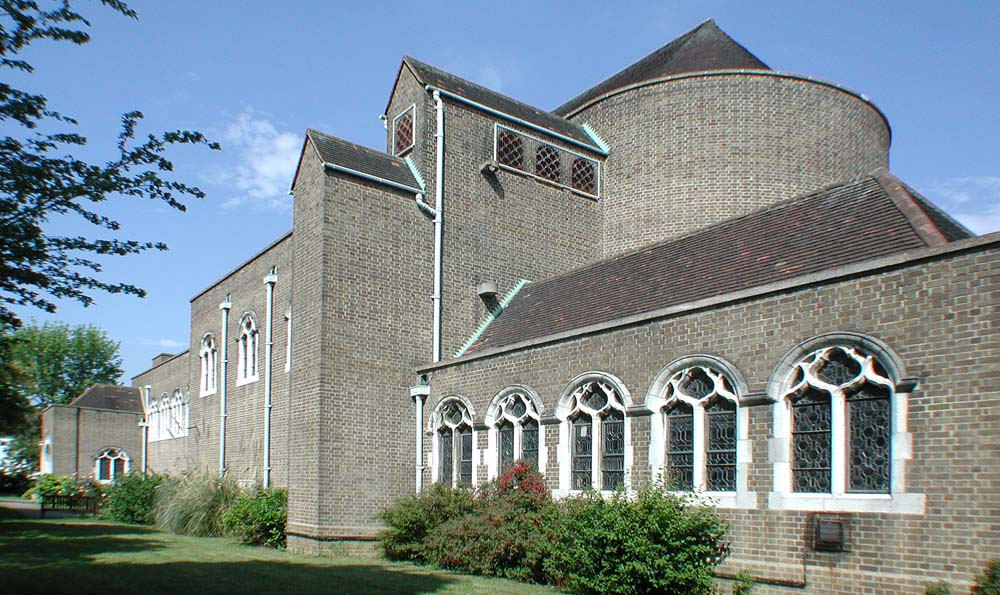
St Anslelm Belmont church in Belmont, Harrow, a Balfour & Turner design which was moved from its original location in Davies Street, London

Balfour and Turner also designed Aldford House on Park Lane, an "ornate but stunted" free-standing stone mansion for the diamond magnate Alfred Beit which was replaced in 1932 by a modernist apartment block designed by Val Myer. Their other most notable work was St Anselm's Church in Davies Street, believed to have been mostly Turner's work, which was regarded as eccentric. Using an arts and crafts-style blending of influences, it had a plain frontage with a basilican interior, and some gothic tracery. When its demolition was planned in 1938, it was dismissed by H. S. Goodhart-Rendel as "a purely personal record of Thackeray Turner's particular tastes". However, the building was not in fact demolished. Instead, it was dismantled and reconstructed in altered form at Uppingham Avenue in the north-west London suburb of Belmont as the church of St Anslelm Belmont. The parish describes it as "a genuinely recycled building".

Balfour held the surveyor's post until 1910, when he was succeeded by Edmund Wimperis. His second decade in the role was less significant than the first, because the death in 1899 of the 1st Duke brought the estate a bill for £600,000 in death duties (equivalent to £66.7 million in 2025). The resulting financial pressure meant that little rebuilding occurred until 1906, and when it resumed Balfour's influence was diminished. He had little affinity with the hedonistic young Hugh Grosvenor, 2nd Duke (grandson of the 1st), who Edwin Lutyens and others had persuaded to adopt a less rigid architectural policy.

== Volunteer ==
In 1882, Balfour joined the Volunteer Force in 1882, becoming a Lieutenant in 1883, and Lieutenant-Colonel in command of the London Scottish Regiment of Volunteers from 1894 to 1902.

He began to take a wider interest in defence issues, writing extensively on the subject, such as The Conditions and Requirements of the Volunteer Force (1886). In July 1899, as the Second Boer War loomed, Balfour offered to raise a thousand men to go and fight, but it was considered too early to begin that effort. His offer to the minister George Wyndham was ignored by the War Office, and Balfour reacted angrily, complaining that volunteers were "expected to be fit for service while we are vigorously debarred from seeing any".

Eventually 20,000 volunteers were called up and fought in the war. However, Balfour's need to liaise with the 2nd Duke of Westminster, who had just inherited the Grosvenor Estate, prevented him from joining his force when they travelled to South Africa at the end of 1899. He remained in command of the London Scottish until late 1902, when he resigned in protest at financial controls that prevented payments to volunteers if there was an insufficient number of raised troops. On his resignation he was granted the honorary rank of colonel on 1 November 1902, with permission to wear the uniform of the corps in retirement.

At the end of December 1902, Balfour was awarded the Volunteer Officers' Decoration. Despite his differences with government, or possibly because of them, King Edward VII appointed Balfour in January 1903 as a military aide-de-camp for Volunteer Forces, with the substantive rank of colonel.

== Personal life and family ==
Eustace and Frances Balfour had five children:

- Blanche Elizabeth Campbell Dugdale (1880–1948), a biographer of her uncle the Prime Minister Arthur Balfour, and later a noted Zionist
- Francis Cecil Campbell Balfour (1884–1965), who became a colonial Governor in Sudan in the 1920s
- Oswald Herbert Campbell Balfour (1894–1953), Military Secretary to the Governor-General of Canada, 1921–23
- Joan Eleanor Campbell Balfour (died 1939)
- Alison Catherine Campbell Balfour (died 3 September 1955)

Accounts of their marriage diverge widely. Frances's congenital hip dislocation left her in constant pain, and often irritable. The couple's temperament and interests were opposites, Frances's enthusiasm for politics and intellectual company contrasting with her husband's lifelong passion for shooting and his later interest in the military.

Hartley writes that theirs was "not a particularly happy marriage". Knox confirms this view, noting that neither Blanche Dugdale's memoirs nor Frances Balfour's autobiography writes much about their relationship with Eustace, and that Frances wrote at length about his brother Arthur whom she "far preferred to Eustace".

Author Joan B. Huffman is more cautious, noting that crucial sources are unavailable since Frances destroyed all Eustace's letters to her. However, Huffman records that she did support her husband when his sister Alice repeatedly challenged him over his drinking.

== Death ==
Balfour's drinking problem became serious around 1906, and in 1909 his health began to deteriorate seriously. In December 1910 he returned to Whittingehame, where he died aged 56 at 6 am on 14 February 1911, surrounded by his family. Eustace was the third of the five Balfour brothers to die relatively young, Cecil and Francis having both been killed in accidents in the early 1880s.

Balfour was buried at Whittingehame, with his parents and grandparents. Frances survived him by 20 years (until 1931), and was buried alongside him.

Rudyard Kipling, a member like Balfour of the Savile Club in London, described him as "a large, loveable man, and one of the best of talkers".
