= Joan, Lady John Campbell =

Scottish heiress

Joan, Lady John Campbell (born Joan Glassel; 9 June 1796 – 22 January 1828) was a Scottish heiress, and second wife of John Campbell, 7th Duke of Argyll.

== Life and marriage ==
Joan was born in Gladsmuir, East Lothian, Scotland, the only daughter of John Glassell who had emigrated to the Colonies with his brother, Andrew. However, John Glasell did not care for the Colonies and returned to Scotland and married Helen Buchanan; some accounts say that she was born in Longniddry after his return. Glassel was a member of a Lowland Scots family, and his wife, Helen née Buchan, was also Scottish. Glassel owned extensive property in Virginia, which he signed over to his brother Andrew Glassell at the beginning of the American War of Independence, returning to Scotland.

Joan married the future duke in 1820, when he was known as Lord John Campbell. He had previously been divorced from his first wife Elizabeth, whom he had married against the wishes of his father in 1802.

Lord and Lady John had three children:

- John Henry Campbell, Earl of Campbell (1821–1837)
- George Douglas Campbell, 8th Duke of Argyll (1823–1900), who was married three times and had issue
- Lady Emma Augusta Campbell (1825–1893), who married Rt. Hon. Sir John McNeill on 26 August 1870.

After Joan's death in 1828, Argyll married a third time, to Anne Monteith, a widow and the eldest daughter of John Cuninghame; she had been a friend of his second wife. He inherited his father's dukedom in 1839, thus his second wife was never Duchess of Argyll.

The duke died, aged 69, in Inveraray Castle in Argyllshire and was buried at Kilmun Parish Church. Having been predeceased by his elder son John in 1837, he was succeeded in the dukedom and his other titles by his second son, George.
