= What the Butler Saw =

What the Butler Saw is a phrase that relates to voyeurism. The phrase entered British popular culture after the 1886 divorce case of Gertrude Elizabeth Blood. The trial hinged on whether a butler could have seen Blood's adultery through a bedroom keyhole. It can also relate to;

== Film ==
- What the Butler Saw (mutoscope), a 1900s erotic film shown on a viewing machine
- What the Butler Saw (1924 film), by George Dewhurst, Edward Mouillot, and Edward Parry
- What the Butler Saw (1950 film), by Donald and Roger Good, directed by Godfrey Grayson

== Other ==
- What the Butler Saw (play), 1967 play by Joe Orton, first produced on the stage in 1969, two years after Orton's death
- What the Butler Saw (TV series), a British reality show
- "What the Butler Saw" (The Avengers), a 1966 television episode
- "What the Butler Saw" (The Detectives), a 1993 television episode
