= 1878 Argyllshire by-election =

UK Parliamentary by-election

The 1878 Argyllshire by-election was fought on 27 August 1878. The by-election was fought due to the resignation of the incumbent Liberal Member of Parliament, the Marquess of Lorne to become Governor General of Canada. It was retained by Lorne's brother the Liberal candidate Lord Colin Campbell.

By-election, 31 Aug 1878: Argyllshire
Party	Candidate	Votes	%	±%
Liberal	Colin Campbell	1,462	56.9	N/A
Conservative	John Malcolm	1,107	43.1	New
Majority		355	13.8	N/A
Turnout		2,569	82.0	N/A
Registered electors		3,133		
Liberal hold		Swing	N/A	

== Expenses ==
Lord Campbell's expenses came to £5,700 9s 4d and Colonel Malcolm's were approximately £9,000.
