= Kilmun Parish Church and Argyll Mausoleum =

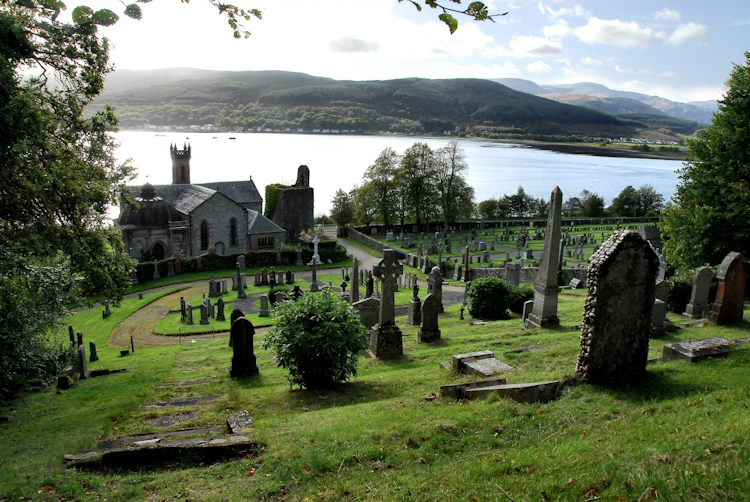
- The church and medieval tower, with the northern end of the Holy Loch in the background
- Kilmun Parish Church and Argyll Mausoleum
- 55.9964°N 4.9424°W
- Location: Midge Lane, Kilmun, Argyll and Bute
- Country: Scotland
- Denomination: Church of Scotland

History
- Status: open

Architecture
- Functional status: used
- Years built: 1841

Kilmun Parish Church and Argyll Mausoleum in Kilmun, Argyll and Bute, Scotland, consists of St Munn's Church (a Category-A-listed building but no longer a parish church of the Church of Scotland), as well as the adjacent mausoleum of the Dukes of Argyll and a historically significant churchyard. The complex is located on the summit of a slight knoll about ten metres from the shoreline of the Holy Loch on the Cowal Peninsula in Argyll, Scotland. The existing church dates from 1841 and occupies the site of an older, medieval church. A partly ruined tower from the medieval period still stands to the west of the present building.

== St Munn's Church ==
=== History ===
Most of St Munn's Parish Church as it appears today dates from the 19th century, although the old, ruined tower located to the west of the present building (now a scheduled monument) belongs to a much older foundation.

In the 7th century, an Irish monk, St Munn (Fintán of Taghmon), founded a monastic community at Kilmun. The remains of a 12th-century church are still visible. At the present site, a church building is recorded in the 13th century. By the 15th century, the significance of Kilmun as a local centre of Christianity was so great that the adjacent loch became known as the Holy Loch, and the powerful Clan Campbell adopted it as their spiritual home. From the 14th century, Dunoon Castle, a short distance away, was held by the Campbell family and in the 1440s Sir Duncan Campbell of Lochawe (later 1st Lord Campbell), the then chief of the clan, lived near Kilmun in a private residence named Strathechaig. When his eldest son Archibald died tragically in 1442, the young man was laid to rest at Kilmun. This marked the beginning of the tradition of Kilmun as Campbell burial place.

Soon after this, the said Sir Duncan Campbell endowed Kilmun parish church as a collegiate church, ensuring continued praying there for him, his ancestors and his descendants. At that time, Kilmun was closely linked with Paisley Abbey, and St Munn was adopted as the patron saint of Clan Campbell. At the collegiate church, a provost and five chaplains were appointed. The now partly ruined tower to the west of Kilmun Parish Church was the residence for these six clergymen and a place of refuge for the local population during dangerous times. The clergymen at Kilmun were priests living as a community, not actual monks, and could have played an active part in the local community in addition to their religious duties of saying prayers and masses. Duncan Campbell died in 1453 and was buried near the altar of his collegiate church. This began the tradition of burying chiefs of Clan Campbell at Kilmun.

In 1688 the choir of the collegiate church was re-built to serve as a parish church.

In 1841 the bulk of the collegiate church was demolished to make way for a new church designed by architect Thomas Burns. A new church building had become necessary to house the increasing number of summer visitors to the Holy Loch. A thorough restoration of the parish church and Argyll Mausoleum was carried out in the 1890s, led by the Marquess of Lorne, who later succeeded as 9th Duke of Argyll. Between 1898 and 1899, the architect Peter McGregor Chalmers re-arranged the interior of the church and also designed much of the carved chancel furniture and paneling.

Kilmun Parish Church became a Category-A-listed building on 20 July 1971.

Following a lengthy period of gradual degradation by water damage to the Argyll Mausoleum, which had started with the installation of the large cast iron dome in the 1890s and which had begun to affect Kilmun Parish Church during the 1970s, a charitable company (Argyll Mausoleum Ltd) was established by local activists to manage a major renovation project, the first since the refurbishment of the mausoleum under the Marquess of Lorne in the 1890s. Argyll Mausoleum Ltd was given the task of managing fundraising to repair the Argyll Mausoleum and the church, to create a visitor facility and a programme of community events. Having raised nearly £600,000 to carry out the work, conservation architects and building contractors were appointed in 2011. During the last quarter of 2012, Argyll Mausoleum Ltd focused on historical research and the archaeological study of the site. Conservation of the mausoleum and construction of the visitor centre with a series of interpretation panels began in the spring of 2013, and the refurbished site was opened to the public in April 2015. Volunteers now offer regular guided tours of both church and mausoleum on Thursdays, Fridays and Saturdays, from the beginning of April through to the end of October. The Church of Scotland are currently seeking to dispose of Kilmun Parish Church; it is no longer an active place of worship for the dwindling local community.

=== Architecture ===
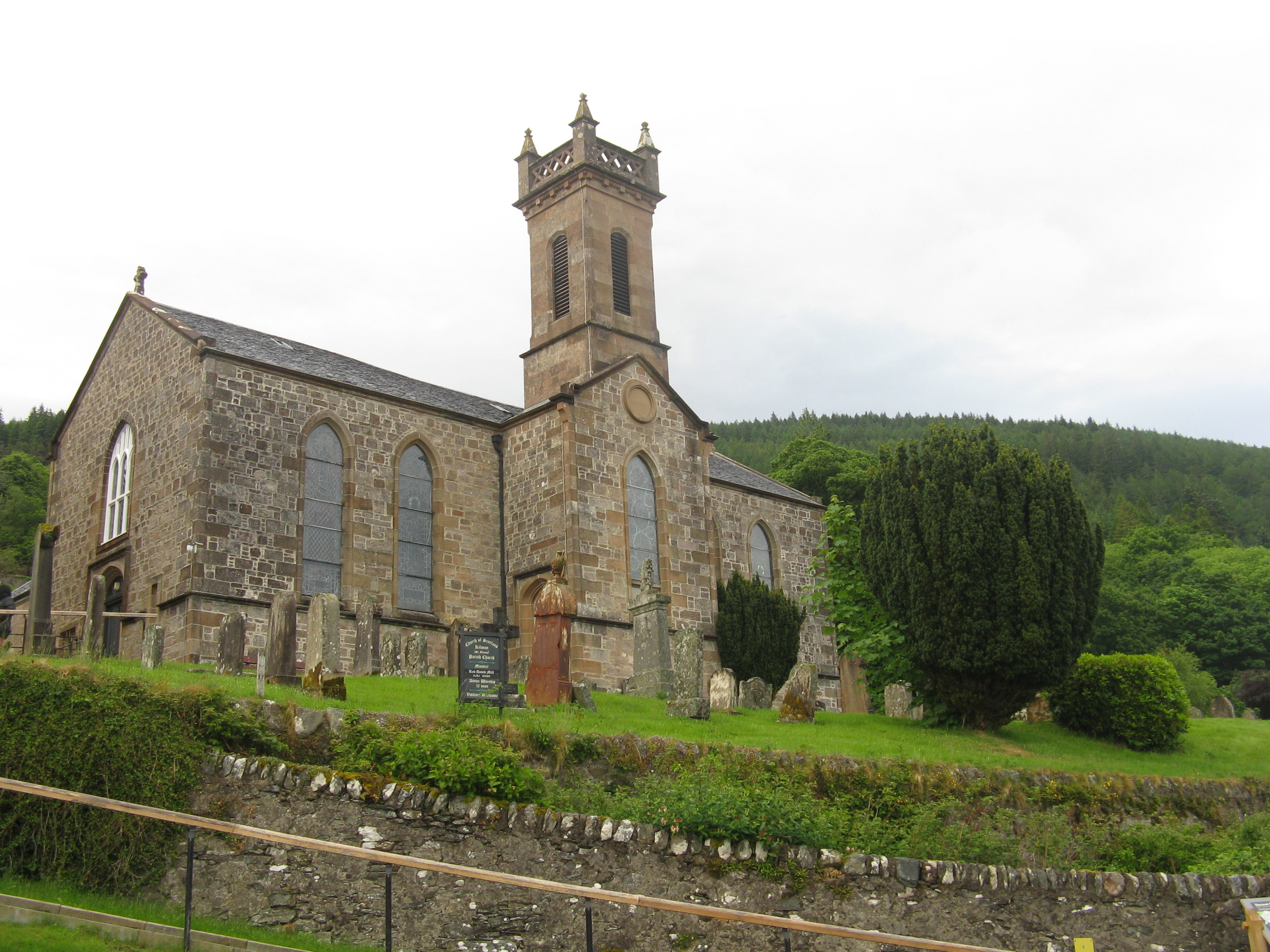
The church's façade with the non-matching modern bell tower.

==== Exterior ====
St Munn's is built of snecked, squared sandstone rubble with ashlar dressings. The roof is made of grey slate. The main body of the church is on a T-shaped floor plan, with the nave extending to the north.

At the head of the T-shaped building is a small, modern square bell tower with corner finials and a pierced stone parapet, over an advanced, gabled central bay. The old tower to the west of the present church, which features ashlar sandstone, seems to have been part of the medieval parish church which was endowed as a collegiate church in 1442 by Sir Duncan Campbell.

The church is lit by single lancet windows on the main southern wall and by wider traceried lancets on the eastern and western gables. The church contains a number of stained glass windows, many by Stephen Adam, including life of Christ scenes and a portrait of George Miller of Invereck as St Matthew. Adam's successor, Alfred Webster, designed a number of later windows, including a war memorial window in the northern gable. The halls in the north-western angle of the church were built in 1909–10, also by Chalmers. Piend-roofed, with mullioned and leaded windows.

==== Interior ====
In 1898–99, the architect Peter McGregor Chalmers re-arranged the interior of St Munn's, forming an open choir in the place of the closed vestry on the southern wall. He introduced new arcades supporting the eastern and western galleries. Much of the intricately carved chancel furniture and panelling was also designed by McGregor Chalmers.

The church's flat ceiling is supported by decorative Tudor-arched trusses supported on stone corbels. The walls are rendered with exposed sandstone dressings and panelled to dado height.

The church contains a hydraulically powered organ by Norman & Beard of 1909, which (apart from St Mary's, Dalkeith) is probably the only water-powered organ in Scotland still in use.

== Argyll Mausoleum ==
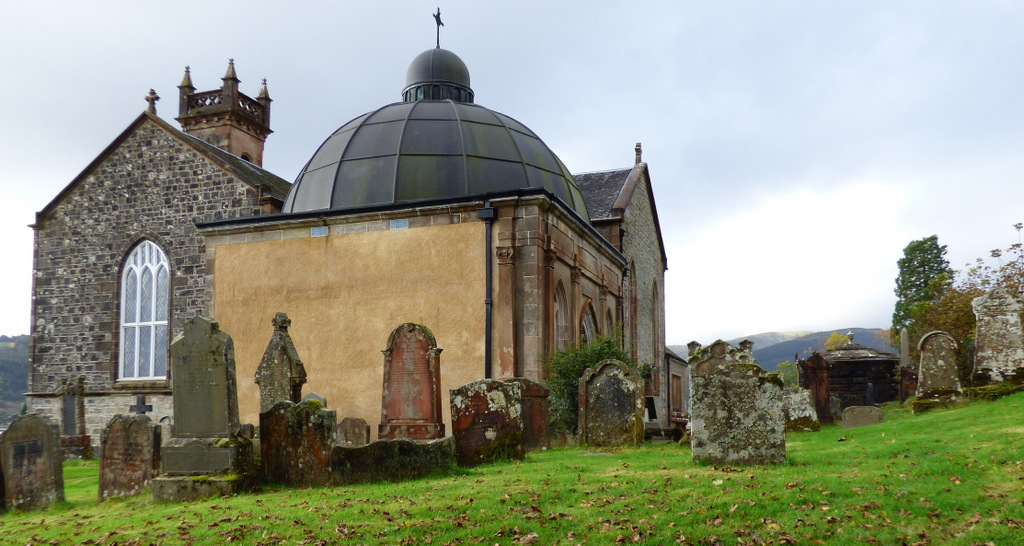
The Argyll Mausoleum at Kilmun Parish Church

=== History ===
The Argyll Mausoleum is separate from, but attached to, St Munn's Church. The mausoleum was commissioned in the 1790s by John Campbell, 5th Duke of Argyll to house the remains of the Dukes and Earls of Argyll, Chiefs of the Clan Campbell, and their families. It is currently managed by Argyll Mausoleum Ltd, under the banner of Historic Kilmun, who also have a modern visitor centre in the vestry of Kilmun Church, open between April and October (inclusive) on Thursdays, Fridays and Saturdays.

Constructed in 1795–96 to the designs of James Lowrie, the Argyll Mausoleum is the burial place of most Dukes of Argyll. It was built around an already extant Campbell vault which was originally located inside the collegiate church. Beginning with Archibald Campbell in 1442, the early burials on the site were under the floor of the medieval church, but the practice was forbidden in 1588 during the Reformation. While outlawing burials inside churches, it did not put an immediate end to the practice, and the Campbells eventually began to build a 'burial aisle', attached to the church. A private chapel with family vault was constructed off the nave of the church by the 9th Earl of Argyll in 1669. This vault remained in situ when the collegiate church was demolished and the present church built. When the private chapel was demolished and a separate mausoleum built in its place, some of the more important remains were moved from the private chapel into the mausoleum. These included the effigies of Duncan Campbell and his wife. When in 1841 the old collegiate church was replaced, partially on the original site, by the current larger parish church, two of the walls of the Argyll Mausoleum were integrated into the new church. The current building thus replaces an earlier chapel in the collegiate church and records indicate that Chiefs of the Clan Campbell have been buried or commemorated here since the 15th century – a total of twenty generations over 500 years.

When the Argyll Mausoleum was built in the 1790s, it first had a slate pyramid roof. The slate roof was replaced with a large cast iron dome during a thorough restoration of the mausoleum in the 1890s which was led by the Marquess of Lorne. While the installation of the large cast iron dome helped to improve lighting within the mausoleum, it was never properly sealed to the supporting walls and water began to enter the building. Water ingress seems to have been confined to the Argyll Mausoleum itself until around the 1970s. It then started to affect the adjacent parish church. St Munn's congregation were concerned and, assuming that the mausoleum was the property of the Duke of Argyll's Estates, requested that the problem be addressed. It turned out that the Dukes of Argyll did not own the mausoleum, but that it had transferred to the ownership of the Argyll and Bute Council in the 1920s. A 30-year legal wrangle ensued, before the situation was finally resolved and the Council conceded ownership of the deteriorating building. In the early 2000s, a survey described the state of the mausoleum: "It has got water coming in the roof, water coming in the walls (...) Every time I come here I see more pieces of stone dropping off. The place is desperately in need of restoration."

The necessary work was eventually carried out under the management of Argyll Mausoleum Ltd, with funding from the National Lottery Heritage Fund, and the mausoleum was reopened in April 2015. You can now visit the beautifully restored mausoleum, church and visitor centre from Thurs - Saturday, 10am - 4pm, between the beginning of April and the end of October.

=== Architecture ===
==== Exterior ====
The Argyll Mausoleum is located at the north-east corner of the church and connected with the latter. The mausoleum is on a square-shaped floor plan with the pointed-arched entrance on the northern elevation, flanked by two blind-traceried lancets and applied pilasters.

One of the most noticeable features of the Argyll Mausoleum is the large cast iron dome over the building. When it was constructed in the 1790s, the mausoleum had a slated pyramid roof with no windows. This had the effect that no daylight could enter the building, except when the doors were open. When the Marquess of Lorne supervised his mother's funeral in 1878, he described the interior of the mausoleum as 'ghastly'. When he supervised the restoration of the mausoleum in the 1890s, he had the pyramid roof replaced in 1891–93 by a domed roof with rooflights and an enormous cast iron dome at the apex. It is believed that the massive cast iron dome was forged at a foundry in the Glasgow shipyards and transported to the site. The craftsmen's marks can still be seen on the inside of the roof. The decision to put such a heavy object on the extant mausoleum walls seems to have been controversial at the time, although the weight proved to have little detrimental effect.

==== Interior ====
The interior of the Argyll Mausoleum consists of two platforms on the side walls with niches for coffins, which are covered with inscribed sandstone slabs. In addition to the tombs lining both sides of the mausoleum, there are also graves under the stone floor.

Amongst the slabs set onto the floor, there is a metal cross with "Archibald, Marquis of Argyll" carved on the shaft and "Beheaded 1661" on the crossbar – the final resting place of Archibald Campbell, 8th Earl and 1st Marquess of Argyll, whose body was buried at Kilmun after his execution in Edinburgh in 1661, his head being interred here three years later. His actual resting place was forgotten until the 1890s. As part of the restoration work carried out at the Argyll Mausoleum by the Marquess of Lorne, a pit was dug down the side of the mausoleum's inside wall to see how deep the foundations went and how strong they were. When the builders got to six feet down they found a skeleton and a skull alongside it, with a spike hole through it. The builder's notes also record finding a yellow wig there, and that it fell apart as soon as he touched it. Archibald Campbell was reburied in the centre of the mausoleum, with a cross to his memory set in the floor. At its foot, set low in the east of the walled burial aisle containing the Campbell tombs and carrying the commemorative stone plaques, is a plaque carrying the words spoken by him just before his execution.

On the south wall there is a wide cusped arch over a niche containing two 15th-century effigies. One is that of Duncan Campbell, 1st Lord Campbell, the founder of the collegiate church, in full armour. The second effigy is of a female, probably Campbell's second wife, Margaret Stewart, the daughter of Sir John Stewart of Ardgowan. These two medieval burial effigies are thought to be the last examples of such quality in Scotland. The decorated cusped arch over the two effigies was added in 1892 as part of the restoration work carried out by the Marquess of Lorne.

In the centre aisle of the mausoleum, between the tombs lining both side walls, stood a life-sized sculpture of an angel lifting Christ from the Cross. It was made by the Marquess of Lorne's wife, Princess Louise (Queen Victoria's fourth daughter), who was a skilled artist and had married the future 9th Duke of Argyll in 1871 and now resides inside a glass showcase in the visitor centre. Three casts were made of Princess Louise's design, one forming the monument to colonial soldiers of the Boer War in St Paul's Cathedral, London, while another is a memorial to Princess Louise's brother-in-law, Prince Henry of Battenberg, in St. Mildred's Church, Whippingham. The cast placed in the Argyll Mausoleum may have been a tribute to her father-in-law, the 8th Duke of Argyll.

=== Campbell burials ===
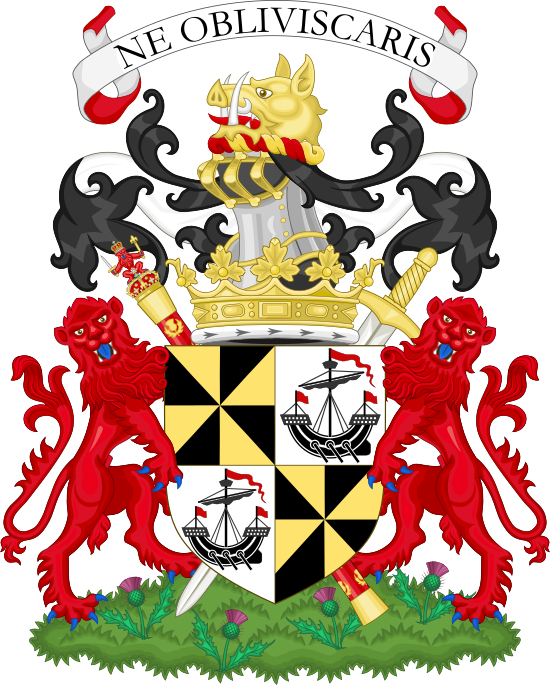
Arms of the Campbell Dukes of Argyll

Kilmun Parish Church and the Argyll Mausoleum mark the burial place of many members of the Clan Campbell of Argyll from the 15th to the 20th century, including most Dukes and Duchesses of Argyll. It is believed that the earliest Chiefs of the Clan Campbell were laid to rest at Kilchrenan, and then on the island of Inishail in Loch Awe. When in 1442 Sir Duncan Campbell's eldest son Archibald died and a fierce snowstorm prevented the burial party from reaching the island of Inishail, the young man was buried at Kilmun, thus beginning the tradition of Kilmun as burial place of the Campbells. Various sources detail the names of the Campbell family members buried at Kilmun, and it can be seen that almost all clan Chiefs were buried here from 1442 until 1949.

While the precise location of the early burials of members of the Clan Campbell on the Kilmun site is unknown, the location of the more recent interments in the Argyll Mausoleum is clearly visible. While the burials of clan Chiefs' wives were not recorded in the same way, the majority of them will have been buried beside their husbands and other unrecorded close family members will also lie at Kilmun.

Burials of members of the Campbell family at Kilmun, both at the church and in the Argyll Mausoleum, include:

- Archibald Campbell, Master of Campbell († 1440s, also known as Celestine, Gillespic or Roy of Kilbride) – eldest son of the 1st Lord Campbell
- Duncan Campbell, 1st Lord Campbell († 1453)
- Marjorie Campbell, née Stewart – daughter of Robert Stewart and wife of the 1st Lord Campbell
- Margaret Campbell, née Stewart – daughter of Sir John Stewart of Ardgowan and wife of the 1st Lord Campbell
- Colin Campbell, 2nd Lord Campbell, 1st Earl of Argyll († 1493)
- Archibald Campbell, 2nd Earl of Argyll († 1513)
- Sir Duncan Campbell of Glenorchy († 1513)
- Colin Campbell, 3rd Earl of Argyll († 1529)
- Archibald Campbell, 4th Earl of Argyll († 1558)
- Archibald Campbell, 5th Earl of Argyll († 1573)
- Colin Campbell, 6th Earl of Argyll († 1584)
- Janet Campbell, née Cunningham († 1585) – daughter of the Earl of Glencairn and wife of the 5th Earl of Argyll
- Agnes Campbell, née Douglas († 1607) – daughter of the 6th Earl of Morton and wife of the 7th Earl of Argyll
- Archibald Campbell, 7th Earl of Argyll († 1638)
- Margaret Campbell, née Douglas – daughter of 7th Earl of Morton and wife of the 8th Earl and 1st Marquess of Argyll
- Archibald Campbell, 8th Earl of Argyll, 1st Marquess of Argyll († 1661)
- Mary Campbell, née Stewart († 1668) – daughter of the 4th Earl of Moray and wife of the 9th Earl of Argyll
- Archibald Campbell, 9th Earl of Argyll († 1685)
- Some young children of the 9th Earl of Argyll
- Archibald Campbell, 10th Earl of Argyll, 1st Duke of Argyll († 1703)
- Elizabeth Campbell, née Tollemache – daughter of Sir Lionel Tollemache, 3rd Baronet and wife of 1st Duke of Argyll
- Anne Mackenzie, Dowager Countess of Balcarres († 1707) – wife of the 9th Earl of Argyll
- Archibald Campbell, 3rd Duke of Argyll († 1761)
- John Campbell, 4th Duke of Argyll († 1770)
- Elizabeth, Dowager Duchess of Hamilton († 1790) – wife of the 5th Duke of Argyll
- John Campbell, 5th Duke of Argyll († 1806)
- Joan Campbell, née Glassel († 1828) – daughter of John Glassel and wife of the 7th Duke of Argyll
- John Henry Campbell of Longniddry († 1837) – son of the 7th Duke of Argyll, died young
- George Campbell, 6th Duke of Argyll († 1839)
- John Campbell, 7th Duke of Argyll († 1847)
- Elizabeth Campbell, née Sutherland-Leveson-Gower († 1878) – daughter of 2nd Duke of Sutherland and wife of 8th Duke of Argyll
- George Campbell, 8th Duke of Argyll († 1900)
- Archibald Campbell – son of the 8th Duke of Argyll, died young
- John Campbell, 9th Duke of Argyll († 1914)
- Niall Campbell, 10th Duke of Argyll († 1949)

Chiefs of the Clan Campbell buried elsewhere include the 2nd Duke of Argyll († 1743) who was buried at Westminster Abbey in London, as well as the 11th Duke of Argyll († 1973) and the 12th Duke of Argyll († 2001), who both chose to be buried on the island of Inishail in Loch Awe.

== Churchyard ==
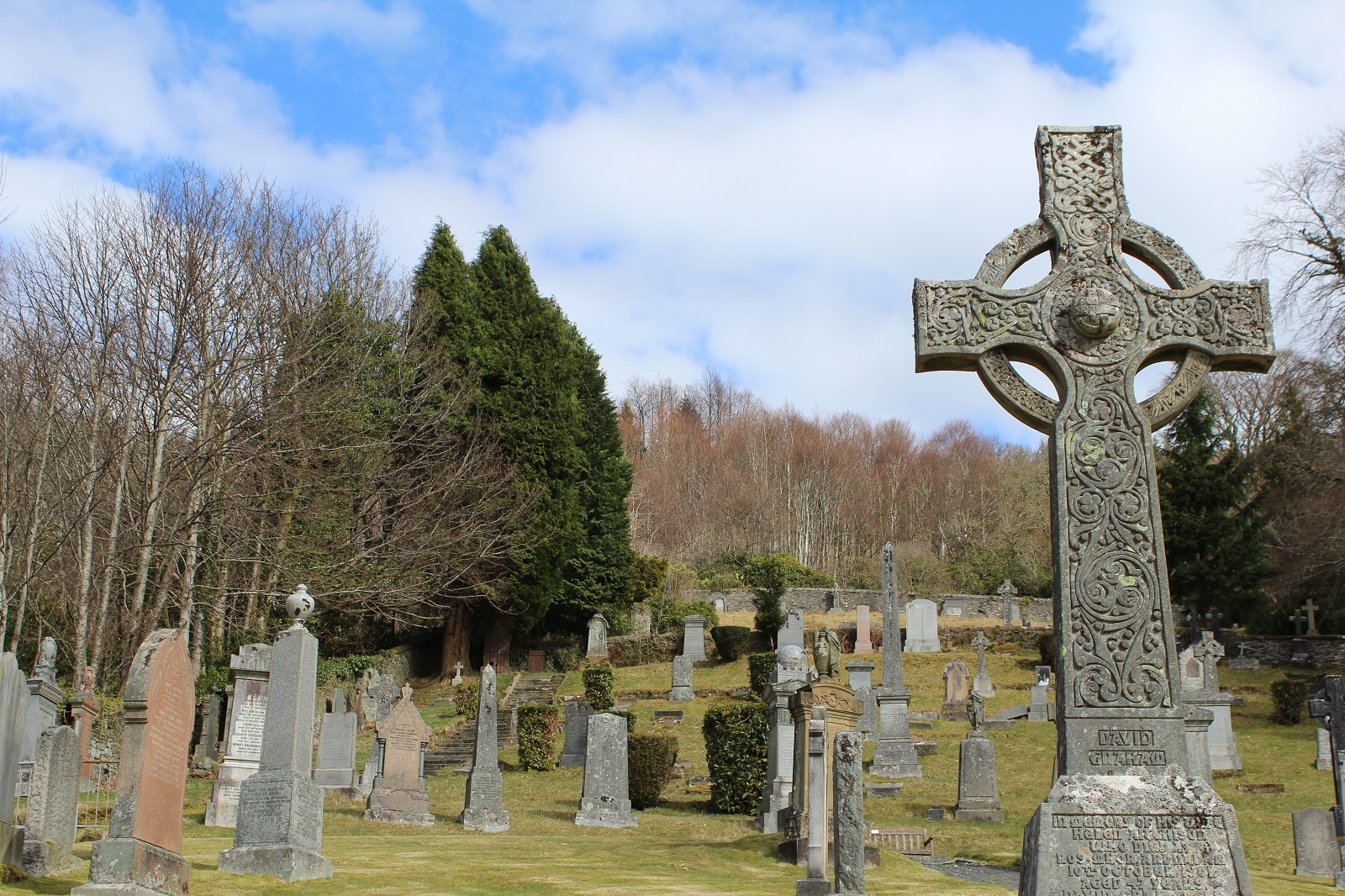
Churchyard

The churchyard at Kilmun Parish Church contains a number of interesting memorials, including later medieval tapered slabs and several high quality post-medieval headstones (mainly from the 17th and 18th century) as well as table-tombs carved with trade tools and the Douglas Mausoleum (see below).

The graveyard was extended twice, at first to the north and later to the west, taking up some of the grounds of Old Kilmun House. The churchyard walls are likely to date from 1818 to 1819, when the graveyard was laid out in its present form.

As part of the programme of community events organised by the Argyll Mausoleum Ltd, several areas of the graveyard have now been surveyed and the inscriptions been recorded. Photos have been taken of most of the gravestones.

Old Kilmun House stands just beyond the northwestern edge of the cemetery, part of which is built on some of the house's gardens.

=== Notable burials ===
The graveyard is said to be the burial place of St Munn, who is also the patron saint of Clan Campbell.

In the north-west of the church is the mausoleum of Sir John Douglas. The octagonal structure was built in 1888 from red sandstone and features rock-cut ashlar walls, a studded timber door with a carved armorial panel above it and a stone-slabbed roof. The mausoleum contains the remains of General Sir John Douglas of Glenfinart (1817–1888), a military commander during the Indian Mutiny.

John Campbell, 9th Duke of Argyll, former Governor General of Canada and husband of Princess Louise is buried at the Argyll Mausoleum.

To the north of the church is the final resting place of Elizabeth Blackwell, the first qualified female physician in the United States.
