= George Campbell, 8th Duke of Argyll =

British polymath and statesman (1823–1900)

His Grace The Duke of Argyll KG KT PC FRS FRSE
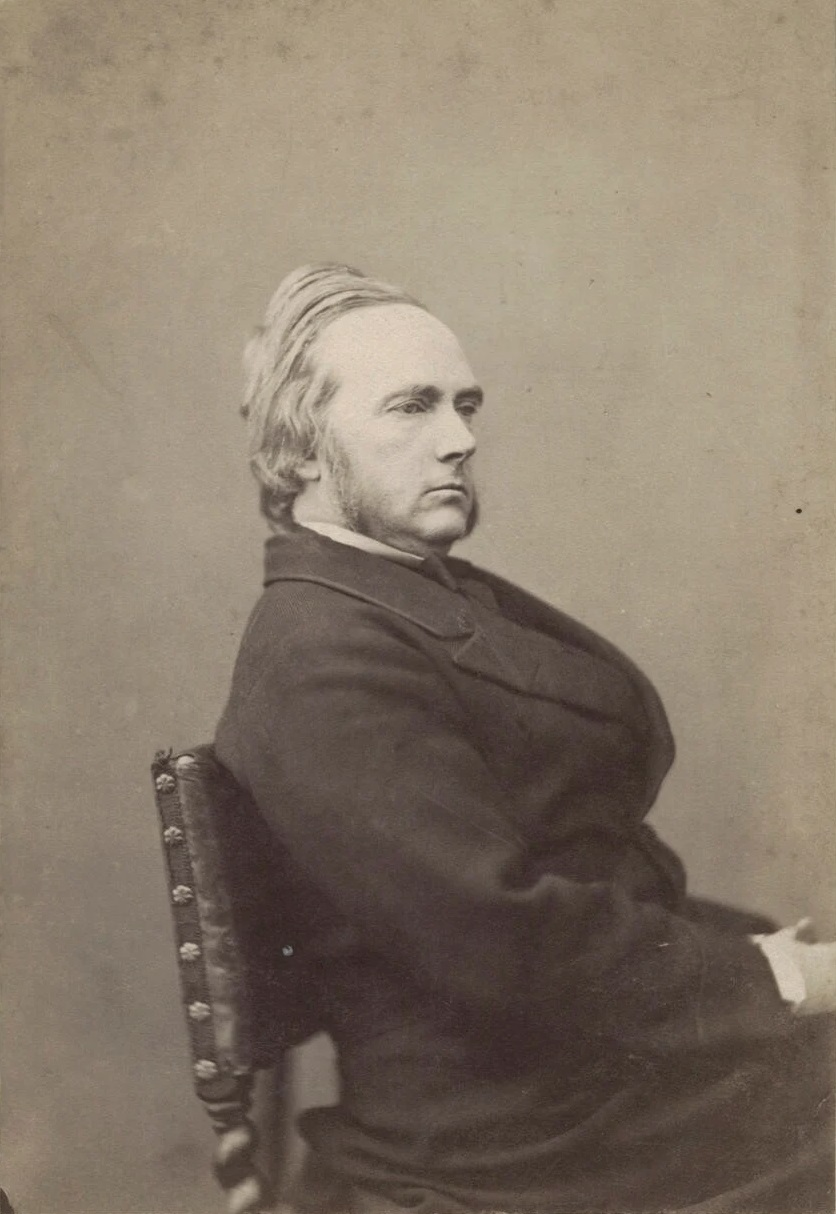
- Portrait by Herbert Rose Barraud, c. 1870-75

Lord Privy Seal
- In office 4 January 1853 – 7 December 1855
- Monarch: Victoria
- Prime Minister: The Earl of Aberdeen; The Viscount Palmerston
- Preceded by: The Marquess of Salisbury
- Succeeded by: The Earl of Harrowby
- In office 18 June 1859 – 26 June 1866
- Monarch: Victoria
- Prime Minister: The Viscount Palmerston; The Earl Russell
- Preceded by: The Earl of Hardwicke
- Succeeded by: The Earl of Malmesbury
- In office 28 April 1880 – 2 May 1881
- Monarch: Victoria
- Prime Minister: William Ewart Gladstone
- Preceded by: The Duke of Northumberland
- Succeeded by: The Lord Carlingford

Postmaster General
- In office 30 November 1855 – 21 February 1858
- Monarch: Victoria
- Prime Minister: The Viscount Palmerston
- Preceded by: The Viscount Canning
- Succeeded by: The Lord Colchester

Secretary of State for India
- In office 9 December 1868 – 17 February 1874
- Monarch: Victoria
- Prime Minister: William Ewart Gladstone
- Preceded by: Sir Stafford Northcote, Bt
- Succeeded by: The Marquess of Salisbury

Personal details
- Born: 30 April 1823 Ardencaple Castle, Dunbartonshire, Scotland
- Died: 24 April 1900 (aged 76) Inveraray Castle, Argyll, Scotland
- Party: Liberal
- Spouses: Lady Elizabeth Sutherland-Leveson-Gower (m. 1844; died 1878) Amelia Claughton (m. 1881; died 1894) Ina McNeill (m. 1895)
- Children: 12, including John, Colin, Victoria and Frances
- Parents: John Campbell, 7th Duke of Argyll; Joan Glassel
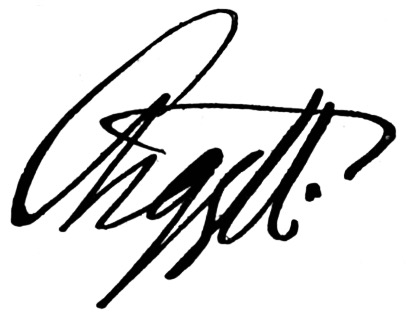
- Signature

George John Douglas Campbell, 8th and 1st Duke of Argyll (30 April 1823 – 24 April 1900; styled Marquess of Lorne until 1847), was a Scottish polymath and Liberal statesman. He made a significant geological discovery in the 1850s when his tenant found fossilised leaves embedded among basalt lava on the Island of Mull. He also helped to popularise ornithology and was one of the first to give a detailed account of the principles of bird flight in the hopes of advancing human flight. His literary output was extensive writing on topics varying from science and theology to economy and politics. In addition to this, he served prominently in the administrations of Lord Aberdeen, Lord Palmerston, John Russell and William Gladstone.

== Background ==
Argyll was born at Ardencaple Castle, Dunbartonshire, the second but only surviving son of John Campbell, 7th Duke of Argyll, and his second wife Joan Glassel, the only daughter of John Glassel. Argyll succeeded his father as Duke of Argyll (Peerage of Scotland) in 1847. With his death he became also hereditary Master of the Household of Scotland and Sheriff of Argyllshire.

He owned 175,000 acres in Argyll and Dumbarton.

== Political career ==
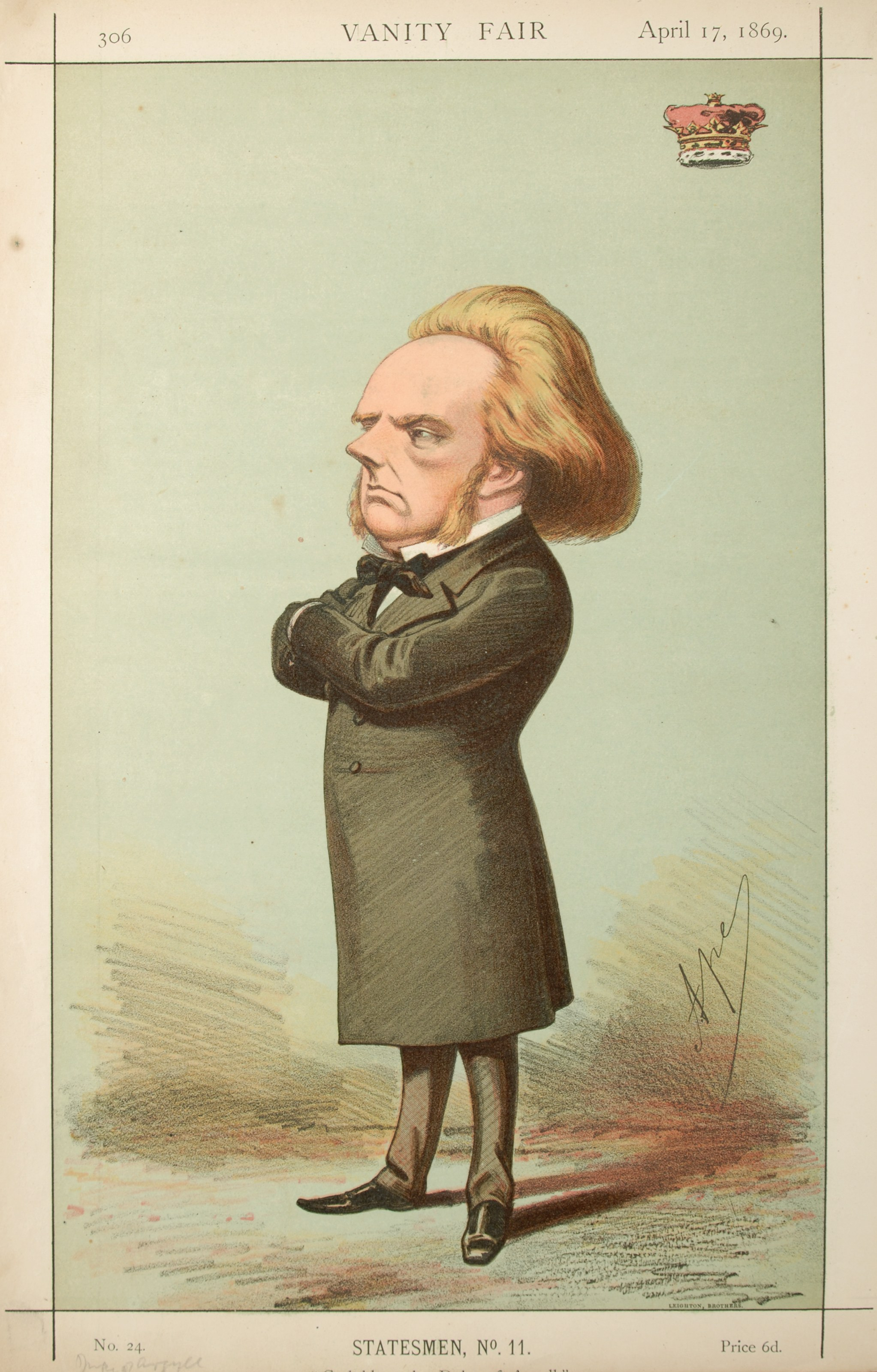
1869 caricature of the Duke of Argyll by Carlo Pellegrini

By the time of his succession, Argyll had already obtained notice as a writer of pamphlets on the disruption of the Church of Scotland, which he strove to avert, and he rapidly became prominent on the Liberal side in parliamentary politics via the Peelite Conservative Party faction. He was a frequent and eloquent speaker in the House of Lords. A close associate of Prince Albert, he served as Lord Privy Seal between 1852 and 1855 in the cabinet of Lord Aberdeen, and then as Postmaster General between 1855 and 1858 in Lord Palmerston's first cabinet.

He was again Lord Privy Seal between 1859 and 1866 in the second Palmerston administration, and then under Lord Russell's second administration, in which position he was notable as a strong advocate of the Northern cause in the American Civil War.

Argyll was a major catalyst of the Education (Scotland) Act 1872. Under his leadership in 1866, the Argyll Commission looked into the Scottish schooling system and found it severely inadequate. The report – eventually finished in 1869 – was used to call for education reforms. As a result of this lobbying, the Education Act (Scotland) 1872 was passed making primary school education mandatory in Scotland for children aged between 5 and 13.

In William Ewart Gladstone's first government of 1868 to 1874, Argyll became Secretary of State for India, in which role his refusal to promise support against the Russians to the emir of Afghanistan helped lead to the Second Afghan War.

Argyll's wife (née Lady Elizabeth Georgiana Leveson-Gower), served as Mistress of the Robes in this government.

Argyll also played a key role in the establishment of the Royal Indian Engineering College which functioned from 1872 to 1906. This college which was located on the Coopers Hill estate, near Egham was set up in order to train civil engineers for service in the Indian Public Works Department. In 1871, while actually serving in the Cabinet, his son and heir, Lord Lorne, married one of Queen Victoria's daughters, Princess Louise, enhancing his status as a leading grandee.

In 1880 he again served under Gladstone, as Lord Privy Seal, but resigned on 31 March 1881 in protest at Gladstone's Land Bill, claiming it would interfere with the rights of landlords and had been brought in response to terrorism. In 1886, he fully broke with Gladstone over the question of the prime minister's support for Irish Home Rule, although he did not join the Liberal Unionist Party, but pursued an independent course. Having been already Vice Lord Lieutenant from 1847, Argyll held the honorary post of Lord Lieutenant of Argyllshire from 1862 until his death in 1900. He was sworn of the Privy Council in 1853, appointed a Knight of the Thistle in 1856 and a Knight of the Garter in 1883. In 1892 he was created Duke of Argyll in the Peerage of the United Kingdom.

== Scholarship ==
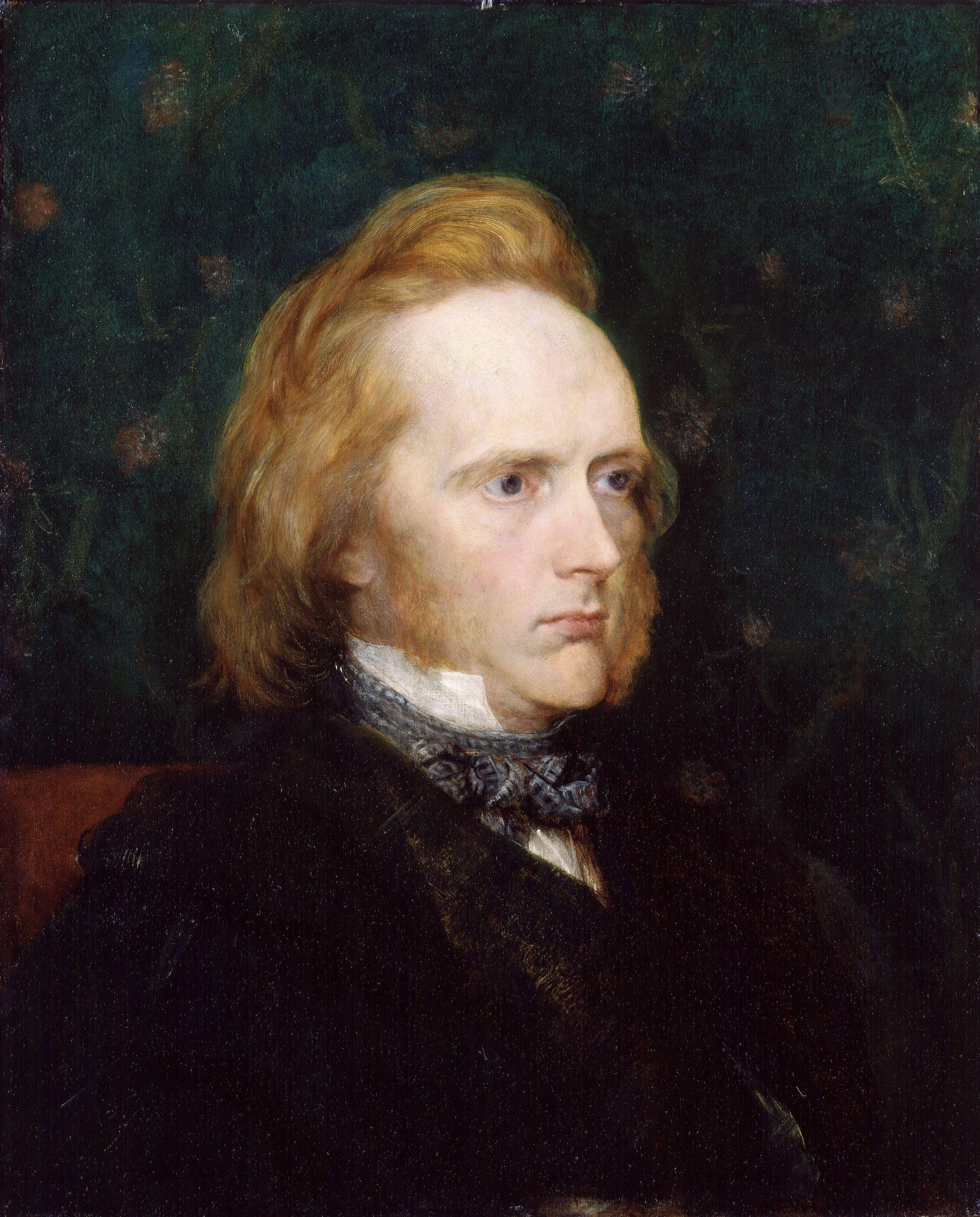
Portrait by George Frederic Watts, c. 1860

Argyll was also an amateur scientist dedicated to many areas of science. Aside from his own work in ornithology, he wrote on anthropology, evolution, glaciology and economics. He was a leader in the scholarly opposition against Darwinism (1869, 1884b) although he was not against the theory of evolution, Argyll argued instead for theistic evolution. He did argue against the erosive capability of glaciers (1873) and was an important economist (1893) and institutionalist (1884a), in which latter capacity he was quite similar to his political opponent, Benjamin Disraeli.

In 1851, he was elected a Fellow of the Royal Society and was appointed Chancellor of the University of St Andrews. Three years later, he became additionally Rector of the University of Glasgow. In 1849 he was elected a Fellow of the Royal Society of Edinburgh and served as its president from 1860 to 1864. In 1855 he became president of the British Association for the Advancement of Science. From 1872 to 1874 he was President of The Geological Society. In 1866, he was a founding member of Britain's first aeronautical society, the Aeronautical Society of Great Britain (later renamed the Royal Aeronautical Society), and served as its president from 1866 to 1895. He was elected a member of the American Antiquarian Society in 1869. In 1886, he was elected as a member to the American Philosophical Society.

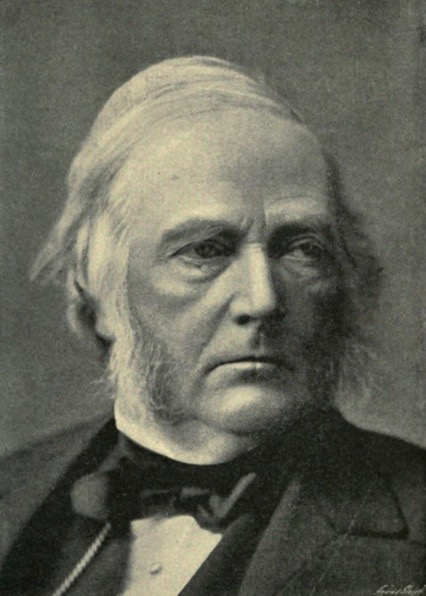
Portrait of Campbell by Elliott & Fry (no later than 1895)

== Private life ==
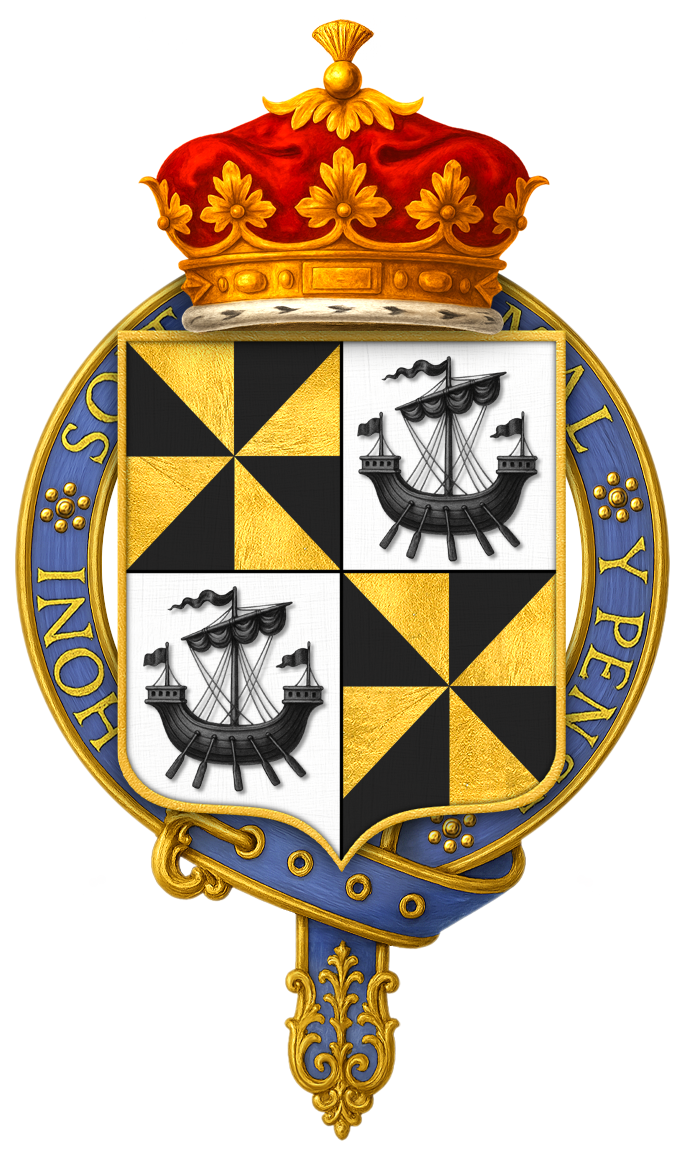
Garter-encircled arms of George Campbell, 8th Duke of Argyll, KG, KT, PC, FRS, FRSE

Argyll was married three times. He married firstly Lady Elizabeth Leveson-Gower, eldest daughter of George Sutherland-Leveson-Gower, 2nd Duke of Sutherland, in 1844. They had five sons and seven daughters, being:

- John Campbell, 9th Duke of Argyll (6 August 1845 – 2 May 1914), married Princess Louise, daughter of Queen Victoria on 21 March 1871.
- Lord Archibald Campbell (18 December 1846 – 29 March 1913), married Janey Callander on 12 January 1869. They had two children, including Niall Campbell, 10th Duke of Argyll.
- Lord Walter Campbell (30 July 1848 – 2 May 1889), married Olivia Rowlandson Milns on 14 April 1874. They had two children, including Douglas Walter Campbell, whose son was Ian Campbell, 11th Duke of Argyll.
- Lady Edith Campbell (7 November 1849 – 6 July 1913), married Henry Percy, 7th Duke of Northumberland on 23 December 1868. They had thirteen children.
- Lord George Granville Campbell (25 December 1850 – 21 April 1915), married Sybil Lascelles Alexander, daughter of James Brace Alexander, on 9 May 1879. They had three children.
- Lady Elisabeth Campbell (14 February 1852 – 24 September 1896) she married Lt.-Col. Edward Harrison Clough-Taylor on 17 July 1880. They had one daughter.
- Lord Colin Campbell (9 March 1853 – 18 June 1895), married Gertrude Blood in 1881.
- Lady Victoria Campbell (22 May 1854 – 6 July 1910).
- Lady Evelyn Campbell (17 August 1855 – 22 March 1940), married James Baillie-Hamilton on 10 August 1886.
- Lady Frances Campbell (22 February 1858 – 25 February 1931), married Eustace Balfour on 12 May 1879. They had five children.
- Lady Mary Emma Campbell (22 September 1859 – 22 March 1947), married Rt. Rev. Hon. Edward Carr Glyn on 4 July 1882. They had three children.
- Lady Constance Harriett Campbell (11 November 1864 – 9 February 1922), married Charles Emmott on 27 June 1891.

The Duchess of Argyll died aged 53 in May 1878. In 1881, Argyll married Amelia Maria (born 1843), daughter of the Right Reverend Thomas Claughton, Bishop of St Albans, and widow of Augustus Anson. She died aged 50 in January 1894. In 1895, Argyll married a third time, to Ina, daughter of Archibald McNeill. Ina survived the duke by a quarter of a century, dying in December 1925. There were no children from either the second or third marriages.

Argyll died at Inveraray Castle in April 1900, six days before his 77th birthday, and is buried at Kilmun Parish Church. He was succeeded in his titles by his eldest son John.

== Legacy ==
Argyll Road in Penang, Malaysia is named in his honour.

== Key works ==
- (1867) The Reign of Law. London: Strahan. (5th Ed. in 1868).
- (1869) Primeval Man: An Examination of some Recent Speculations. New York: Routledge.
- (1873) President's Anniversary Address. Proceedings of the Geological Society. pp. li - lxxviii.
- (1879) The Eastern Question. London: Strahan.
- (1884) The Unity of Nature. New York: Putnam.
- (1887) Scotland As It Was and As It Is
- (1893) The Unseen Foundations of Society. An Examination of the Fallacies and Failures of Economic Science Due to Neglected Elements. London: John Murray.
- (1896) The Philosophy of Belief; Or, Law in Christian Theology
- (1898) Organic Evolution Cross-Examined
- (1906) Autobiography and Memoirs

Political offices
Preceded by The Marquess of Salisbury	Lord Privy Seal; 1852–1855	Succeeded by The Earl of Harrowby
Preceded by The Viscount Canning	Postmaster General; 1855–1858	Succeeded by The Lord Colchester
Preceded by The Earl of Hardwicke	Lord Privy Seal; 1859–1866	Succeeded by The Earl of Malmesbury
Preceded by Sir Stafford Northcote, Bt	Secretary of State for India; 1868–1874	Succeeded by The Marquess of Salisbury
Preceded by The Duke of Northumberland	Lord Privy Seal; 1880–1881	Succeeded by The Lord Carlingford
Honorary titles
Preceded by The Marquess of Breadalbane	Lord Lieutenant of Argyllshire; 1862–1900	Succeeded by The Duke of Argyll
Academic offices
Preceded by The Viscount Melville	Chancellor of the University of St Andrews; 1851–1900	Succeeded by The Lord Balfour of Burleigh
Preceded by The Earl of Eglinton	Rector of the University of Glasgow; 1854–1856	Succeeded by Sir Edward Bulwer-Lytton, Bt
Peerage of Scotland
Preceded by John Campbell	Duke of Argyll; 1847–1900	Succeeded by John Campbell
Peerage of the United Kingdom
New creation	Duke of Argyll; 1892–1900	Succeeded by John Campbell
