= Elizabeth Campbell, Duchess of Argyll =

British abolitionist (1824–1878)

Her Grace The Duchess of Argyll VA CI
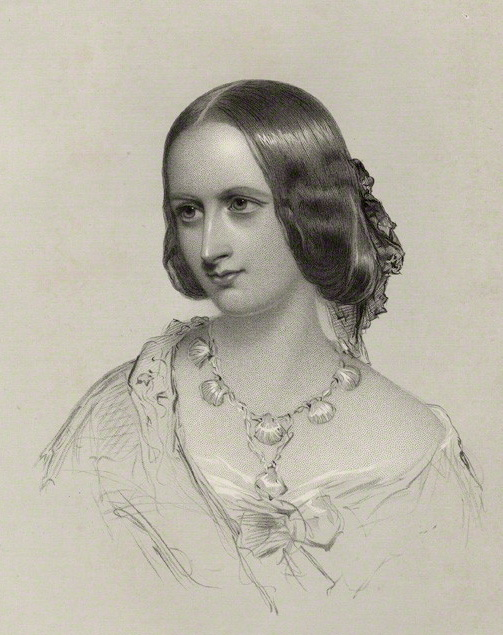
- Born: 30 May 1824; London, England
- Died: 25 May 1878 (aged 53); Carlton House Terrace, London
- Buried: Kilmun Parish Church, Argyll and Bute, Scotland
- Spouse: George Campbell, 8th Duke of Argyll (m. 1844)
- Issue: John Campbell, 9th Duke of Argyll; Lord Archibald Campbell; Lord Walter Campbell; Edith Percy, Duchess of Northumberland; Lord George Campbell; Lady Elizabeth Clough-Taylor; Lord Colin Campbell; Lady Victoria Campbell; Lady Evelyn Baillie-Hamilton; Lady Frances Balfour; Lady Mary Glyn; Lady Constance Emmott
- Father: George Sutherland-Leveson-Gower, 2nd Duke of Sutherland
- Mother: Lady Harriet Howard
- Occupation: Mistress of the Robes to Queen Victoria

Elizabeth Georgiana Campbell, Duchess of Argyll VA CI (née Leveson-Gower; 30 May 1824 – 25 May 1878), was a British noblewoman and abolitionist. Born into the wealthy Sutherland-Leveson-Gower family, she was the eldest daughter of the 2nd Duke of Sutherland by his wife, the political hostess Lady Harriet Howard. In 1844 Elizabeth married George Campbell, Marquess of Lorne, eldest son and heir to the 7th Duke of Argyll. She became the Duchess of Argyll in 1847 when her husband succeeded his father.

Like her mother, the Duchess of Argyll was a prominent opponent of slavery. The pair helped write a letter titled An Affectionate and Christian Address of Many Thousands of Women of Great Britain and Ireland to Their Sisters, the Women of the United States of America, calling for an end of slavery; it attracted signatures from 562,848 British women. The two often hosted the American abolitionist and author Harriet Beecher Stowe when she visited England. The Duchess and Beecher Stowe were friends and maintained a correspondence.

In 1868, the Duchess of Argyll succeeded the Duchess of Wellington as Mistress of the Robes to Queen Victoria, holding the position until 1870, when she resigned due to ill health. Soon after being appointed a member of the newly created Order of the Crown of India, she died in 1878 whilst eating with William Ewart Gladstone in London.

== Family and early life ==
Lady Elizabeth Georgiana Leveson-Gower was raised amidst great wealth. Her paternal grandmother, the great heiress Elizabeth Gordon, was suo jure Countess of Sutherland, overseeing estates that spanned 800,000 to one million acres of Scottish Highlands. The Sutherland lands were further augmented with Gordon's 1785 marriage to George Leveson-Gower (later 1st Duke of Sutherland). In 1823, their son George married Lady Harriet Howard, daughter of George Howard, 6th Earl of Carlisle. Lady Elizabeth Leveson-Gower was born the following year as their eldest daughter, on 30 May 1824. Three brothers and two sisters followed.

With family estates in Scotland and England, Elizabeth's upbringing involved much travel. Their main residence was the lavish Stafford House, London, which they acquired in 1827; they also resided on many country estates. The couple, especially Harriet, led vibrant social lives. She was a political hostess known for her friendship and position as Mistress of the Robes to the young Queen Victoria. In 1833, the 1st Duke died and Elizabeth's father succeeded as 2nd Duke of Sutherland, inheriting extensive property. The historian Eric Richards writes that the first half of the nineteenth century saw the height of the House of Sutherland's social and economic influence, with its wealth being derived from rents, various stocks, and dividends from transportation firms.

== Marriage ==
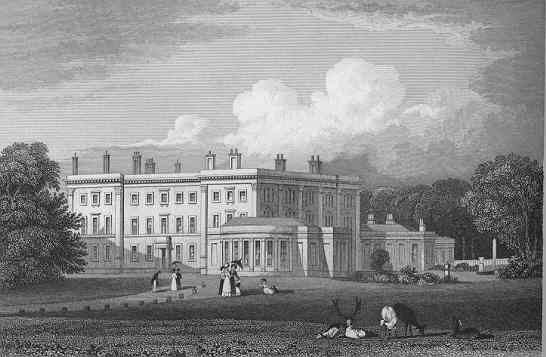
Trentham Hall in the 1820s

While accompanying Queen Victoria to Taymouth Castle in 1842, Lady Elizabeth met George Douglas Campbell, Marquess of Lorne, the eldest son of the 7th Duke of Argyll. They married at the Leveson-Gower estate Trentham Hall on 31 July 1844. The Archbishop of York, Edward Venables-Vernon-Harcourt, presided over the wedding. The Argyll estate was in debt, so Elizabeth's wealth was much needed. Their union resulted in the further joining of two of Scotland's largest landowning families.

The young couple was given Rosneath by his father at the time of their marriage. Deeply religious, Elizabeth had been raised in the Anglican faith but converted to the Church of Scotland upon her marriage, taking her first communion in the faith later that year. Like many of her predecessors, Elizabeth was a strong supporter of the Scottish Episcopal Church in the Diocese of Argyll and The Isles. The couple possessed similar interest in liberal politics. Elizabeth was dignified and cultured, and Lorne found in his new wife "more than all that had been told me by her numerous friends... On some subjects, excepting philosophy and the natural sciences, she was more widely read than I was at the time."

== Duchess of Argyll ==
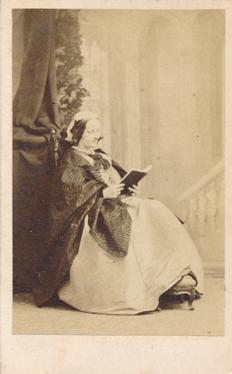
Carte de visite of the Duchess of Argyll

Lorne succeeded his father as 8th Duke of Argyll on 25 April 1847, whereupon Elizabeth became Duchess of Argyll. The family's primary estates included Argyll Lodge in London, the family seat of Inveraray Castle in Argyllshire, and Rosneath. Their first child, John, was born within a year of their marriage. They would have an additional four sons and seven daughters. The Argyll household was sober, proper, and driven by routine with prescribed times for prayer, breakfast, lunch, and dinner. The children were not expected to show emotion such as crying, except for "real causes" like the death of a family pet. The Scottish scholar John Stuart Blackie enjoyed the solemnity of the couple's lifestyle and visited them often; he dedicated his 1876 work Language and Literature of the Scottish Highlands to Elizabeth.

The historian Anne Jordan writes that the Duchess was "old before her time," having given birth to twelve children. She suffered from ill health, in part due to an 1868 stroke which left her partially incapacitated; this forced much of the children's upbringing to be overseen by her husband. Her third daughter Lady Victoria, who also suffered from ill health due to a contraction of poliomyelitis, nursed her mother. Once adults, the children's marriage settlements were a drain on the family's resources, with all but one eventually marrying. Their eldest son John married the Queen's fourth daughter Princess Louise in 1871, and became the Governor General of Canada in 1878.

Like her mother the Duchess of Sutherland, the Duchess of Argyll was a prominent supporter of the abolitionist movement. Elizabeth was one of many British women affected by the 1852 anti-slavery novel Uncle Tom's Cabin. The following year at her mother's house, the Duchess helped draft a letter titled An Affectionate and Christian Address of Many Thousands of Women of Great Britain and Ireland to Their Sisters, the Women of the United States of America. The letter, eventually signed by 562,848 women, called for an end to slavery because the institution did not recognise slave marriages, led to parent-children separations, and prevented slaves from receiving Christian educations. It was sent to the author of Uncle Tom's Cabin, the American abolitionist author Harriet Beecher Stowe; she and the Duchess of Argyll became friends, and maintained a correspondence. Harriet Beecher Stowe would often visit the duchesses of Sutherland and Argyll when she travelled to England and benefited from their connections to senior politicians. The Duke and Duchess of Argyll were also friends with American politician and anti-slavery leader Charles Sumner, leading historian Amanda Foreman to write that the "relationship between [the Duke of Argyll] and Sumner would prove to be one of the most important friendships of the Civil War."

In December 1868, Lady Campbell was appointed Mistress of the Robes to Queen Victoria, succeeding Elizabeth Wellesley, Duchess of Wellington, as a member of William Ewart Gladstone's first ministry. She resigned the position in 1870 due to ill health, and was succeeded by her sister-in-law Anne Sutherland-Leveson-Gower, Duchess of Sutherland. In December 1877, Queen Victoria created the Order of the Crown of India and conferred it upon the Duchess of Argyll and dozens of other royal and noblewomen. She was also a member of the Royal Order of Victoria and Albert, Second Class. The Duchess of Argyll died on 25 May 1878, whilst eating with Gladstone in London. She is buried at Kilmun Parish Church.

Three years later her widower married again, to Amelia Maria, daughter of Thomas Legh Claughton, Bishop of St Albans.

== Issue ==
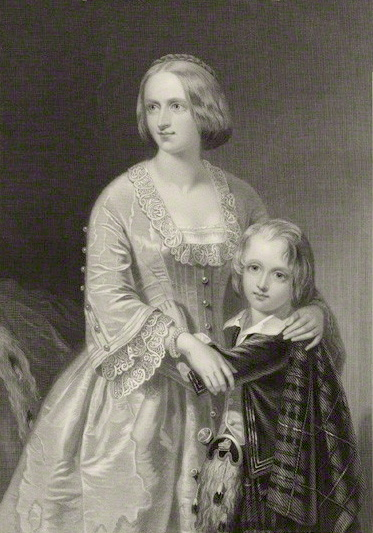
The Duchess of Argyll with her eldest son, John

The Duke and Duchess of Argyll had 12 children:

- John Campbell, 9th Duke of Argyll (6 August 1845 – 2 May 1914); married Princess Louise of the United Kingdom in 1871
- Lord Archibald Campbell (18 December 1846–29 March 1913); married Janey Callendar and had issue including Niall Campbell, 10th Duke of Argyll
- Lord Walter Campbell (30 July 1848 – 2 May 1889); married Olivia Clarkson Miln in 1874, and was the grandfather of Ian Campbell, 11th Duke of Argyll
- Lady Edith Campbell (7 November 1849–6 July 1913); married Henry Percy, 7th Duke of Northumberland in 1868
- Lord George Granville Campbell (25 December 1850– 21 April 1915); married Sybil Alexander in 1879
- Lady Elizabeth Campbell (14 February 1852 - 24 September 1896); married Lt.-Col. Edward Harrison Clough-Taylor in 1880
- Lord Colin Campbell (9 March 1853 - 18 June 1895); married Gertrude Elizabeth Blood in 1881
- Lady Victoria Campbell (22 May 1854 – 6 July 1910)
- Lady Evelyn Campbell (17 August 1855 - 22 March 1940); married James Baillie-Hamilton in 1886
- Lady Frances Campbell (22 February 1858 – 25 February 1931); married the architect Eustace Balfour, brother of the Prime Minister Arthur Balfour
- Lady Mary Emma Campbell (22 September 1859 - 22 March 1947); married Edward Carr Glyn, Bishop of Peterborough
- Lady Constance Harriett Campbell (11 November 1864 – 9 February 1922); married Charles Emmott in 1891

Court offices
Preceded by The Duchess of Wellington	Mistress of the Robes to Queen Victoria; 1868–1870	Succeeded by The Duchess of Sutherland
