= John Campbell, 9th Duke of Argyll =

British nobleman (1845–1914)

His Grace The Duke of Argyll KG KT GCMG GCVO VD PC
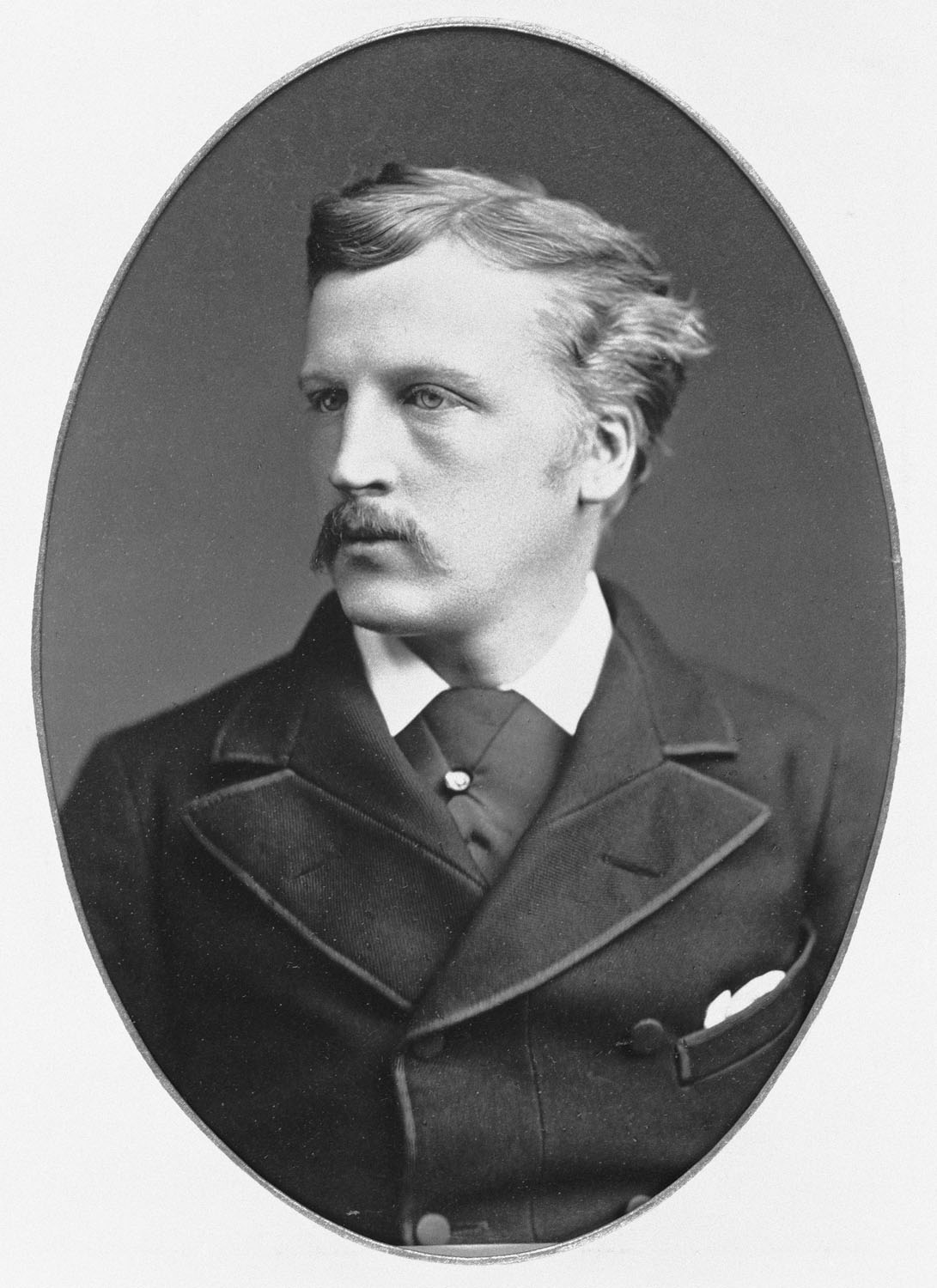

4th Governor General of Canada
- In office 25 November 1878 – 23 October 1883
- Monarch: Victoria
- Prime Minister: Canadian: Sir John A. Macdonald; British: The Earl of Beaconsfield; William Ewart Gladstone
- Preceded by: The Earl of Dufferin
- Succeeded by: The Marquess of Lansdowne

Personal details
- Born: 6 August 1845 London, England
- Died: 2 May 1914 (aged 68) Cowes, England
- Resting place: Kilmun Parish Church, Argyll and Bute, Scotland
- Party: Liberal; Liberal Unionist
- Spouse: Princess Louise (m. 1871)
- Parents: George Campbell, 8th Duke of Argyll (father); Lady Elizabeth Sutherland-Leveson-Gower (mother)
- Education: University of St Andrews; Trinity College, Cambridge

Military service
- Allegiance: Great Britain
- Branch/service: British Army
- Years of service: 1866–1880s
- Rank: Lieutenant Colonel Commandant
- Unit: 1st Argyll and Bute Artillery Volunteers

John George Edward Henry Douglas Sutherland Campbell, 9th Duke of Argyll (6 August 1845 – 2 May 1914), known by the courtesy title Marquess of Lorne from 1847 to 1900, was a British nobleman who was Governor General of Canada from 1878 to 1883. He was the husband of Princess Louise, fourth daughter of Queen Victoria.

== Background and career ==
Campbell was born in London, the eldest son of George, Marquess of Lorne and the former Lady Elizabeth Sutherland-Leveson-Gower, daughter of the 2nd Duke of Sutherland, and was styled Earl of Campbell from birth. In 1847, when he was 21 months old, his father succeeded as 8th Duke of Argyll and he assumed the courtesy title Marquess of Lorne, which he bore until he was 54. He was educated at Edinburgh Academy, Eton College, St Andrews and at Trinity College, Cambridge.

For ten years before coming to Canada, Lorne travelled throughout North and Central America, writing travel literature and poetry. In the UK, he represented, from 1868, the constituency of Argyllshire as a Liberal Member of Parliament in the House of Commons. He made little impression there, however; the London World referred to Lorne as "a non-entity in the House of Commons, and a non-entity without." A.C. Benson, who edited Queen Victoria's letters and spent time in the company of the royals, gave him the same epithet.

He was appointed Lieutenant-Colonel Commandant of the part-time 1st Argyll and Bute Artillery Volunteers on 13 July 1866. He gave up the position in the 1880s, but was appointed the unit's Honorary Colonel on 18 July 1900.

Lord Lorne married Queen Victoria's fourth daughter, Princess Louise, on 21 March 1871. The pair shared a common love of the arts, but the marriage was childless and unhappy, and they spent much time apart. Lorne formed close friendships with men, including Lord Ronald Gower, Morton Fullerton and the Count de Mauny, who were known to be homosexual or bisexual, which fuelled rumours in London society that he shared their predisposition. No conclusive evidence has been found to settle this issue either way.

== Governor General of Canada ==
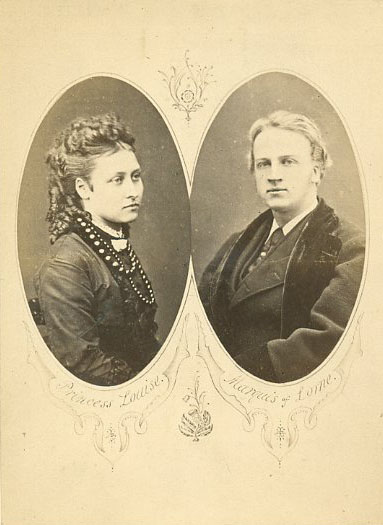
Princess Louise and Lorne engagement

When Lord Lorne's appointment was announced, there was great excitement throughout Canada. For the first time, Rideau Hall would have a royal resident. The Canadian Prime Minister relaxed his busy campaign schedule to prepare for her arrival and to organise a special carriage and corps of guards to protect the Princess. An author wrote in 1880 that "the appointment was hailed with satisfaction in all parts of the Dominion, and the new Governor General entered upon his term of office with the hearts of the people strongly prepossessed [sic] in his favour."

However, Campbell and his wife were initially not received well by the Canadian press, which complained about the imposition of royalty on the country's hitherto un-regal society, a position that was only exacerbated by mishaps and misunderstandings. The worries of a rigid court at the Queen's Canadian residence turned out to be unfounded; the couple were more relaxed than their predecessors, as demonstrated at the many ice skating and tobogganing parties, balls, dinners, and other state occasions hosted by the Marquess and Marchioness.

At age 33, Lord Lorne was Canada's youngest governor general and he became the first representative of Queen Victoria to have been born during the latter's reign but he was not too young to handle the marginal demands of his post. He and Princess Louise made many lasting contributions to Canadian society, especially in the arts and sciences. They encouraged the establishment of the Royal Society of Canada, the Royal Canadian Academy of Arts, and the National Gallery of Canada, even selecting some of its first paintings. Campbell was involved in the completion of the Canadian Pacific Railway and other projects, such as a hospital for British Columbia.

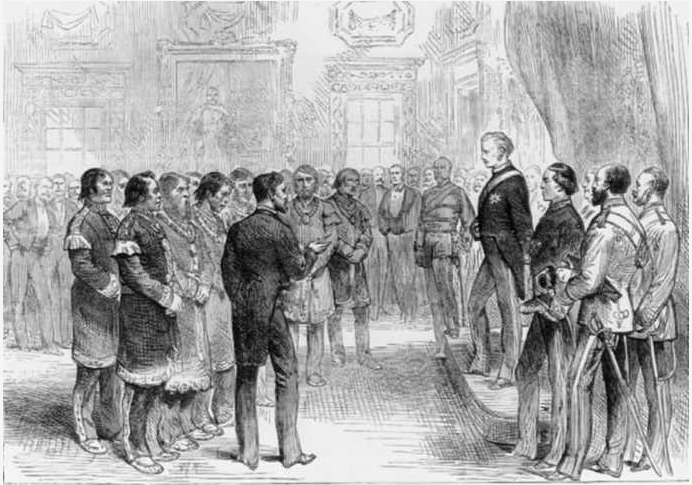
Mi'kmaq Grand Chief Jacques-Pierre Peminuit Paul (3rd from left with beard) meets Governor General of Canada, Lord Lorne, Red Chamber, Province House, Halifax, Nova Scotia, 1879

Throughout his term of office, Lorne was intensely interested in Canada and Canadians. He travelled throughout the country, encouraging the establishment of numerous institutions, and met with First Nations and other Canadians from all walks of life. At Rideau Hall, he and Princess Louise hosted many social functions, including numerous ice skating and tobogganing parties as well as balls, dinners and state occasions. His small collection of First Nations artefacts was purchased by the British Museum in 1887.

== After Canada ==
Princess Louise returned to England in 1881 and Lord Lorne followed two years later in 1883, when his book, Memories of Canada and Scotland, was published.

In 1907, strenuous efforts were taken by officials to ensure that Lorne's name was not dragged into the investigation of the theft of the Irish Crown Jewels. This was due to the fact that his closest friend was Lord Ronald Gower who, while innocent of the crime, was associated with several of the circle who were implicated in it.

Lorne was Governor and Constable of Windsor Castle from 1892 to 1914. He sat in the Commons as MP for Manchester South from 1895 until the death of his father on 24 April 1900, when he succeeded as 9th and 2nd Duke of Argyll, thus moving to the House of Lords. He and Princess Louise lived at Kensington Palace until his death from pneumonia in 1914. He is buried at Kilmun Parish Church.

== Honours ==
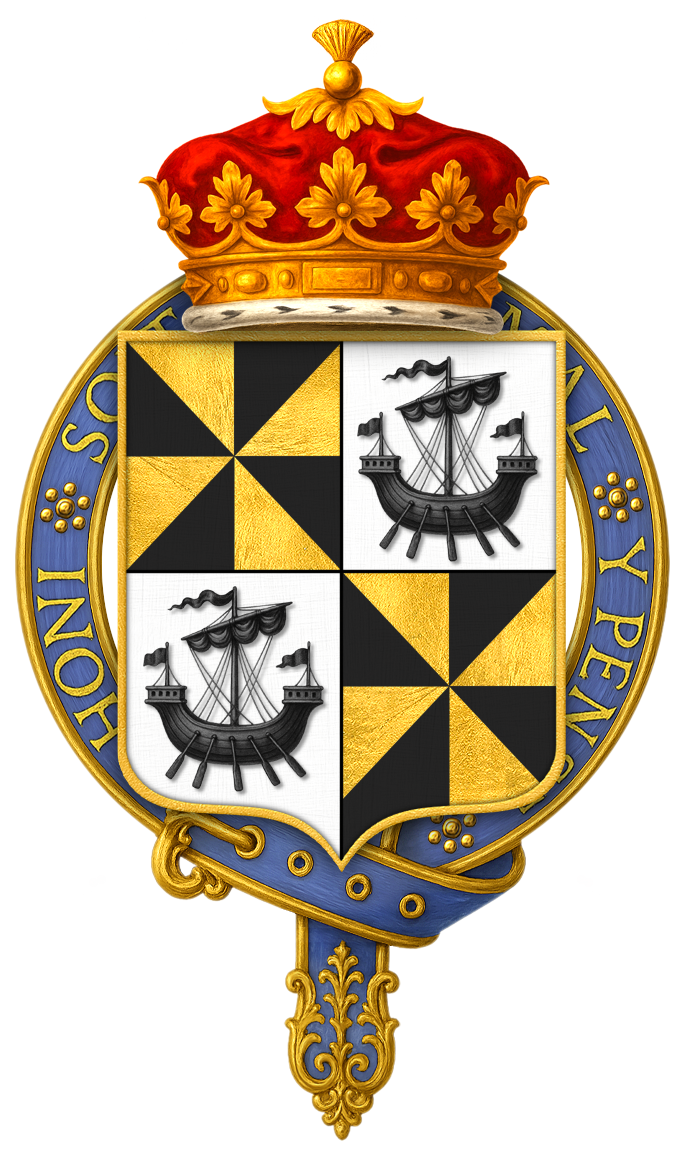
Garter-encircled arms

=== Orders and decorations ===
- KG: Knight Companion of the Most Noble Order of the Garter, 1911
- KT: Knight of the Most Ancient and Most Noble Order of the Thistle, 1871
- GCMG: Knight Grand Cross of the Most Distinguished Order of St Michael and St George, 14 September 1878
- GCVO: Knight Grand Cross of the Royal Victorian Order, 2 February 1901
- (Norway) Knight Grand Cross of the Royal Norwegian Order of Saint Olav, with Collar, 13 November 1906

=== Civil and military appointments ===
- PC: Sworn of Her Majesty's Most Honourable Privy Council, 17 March 1875
- LLD (honorary), University of Cambridge, May 1902
- Honorary Colonel of the 1st Argyll and Bute Artillery Volunteers, 18 July 1900
- Honorary Colonel of the 5th Volunteer Battalion, Princess Louise's (Argyll and Sutherland Highlanders), 20 September 1902

=== Places named after him ===
- Lorne Building, Ottawa, Ontario, Canada
- Port Lorne, Nova Scotia, Canada
- Lorne, Nova Scotia
- Rural Municipality of Lorne, Manitoba, Canada
- West Lorne, Ontario, Canada
- Lorne, Victoria, Australia
- Lorne Street, Oswestry, Shropshire, UK
- Lorne Road, The Alberts, Richmond, London, UK
- Lorne Road, Stroud Green, London N4, UK
- Lorne Avenue, Ottawa, Ontario, Canada
- Lorne Avenue, Trenton, Ontario, Canada
- Lorne Avenue, Stratford, Ontario, Canada
- Lorne Street, Winnipeg, Manitoba, Canada
- Lorne Avenue, Saskatoon, Saskatchewan, Canada
- Marquis Downs, former horse racing track in Saskatoon, Canada (on Lorne Avenue)
- Lorne Street, Montreal, Quebec, Canada
- Lorne Street, Sudbury, Ontario, Canada
- Marquis of Lorne Trail, section of Highway 22X, Calgary, Alberta, Canada (partly renamed in 2009, and then completely in 2013)
- Lorne Park and Lorne Park Estates, in Mississauga, Ontario (by Sarah Jane Earls, descendant of Sir John Mourach, second Marquis of Lorne)
- Rural Municipality of Argyle, Manitoba, Canada
- Lorne, New Brunswick

=== Organizations named after him ===
- The Lorne Scots (Peel, Dufferin and Halton Regiment), infantry regiment of the Canadian Army.

Parliament of the United Kingdom
Preceded by Alexander Finlay	Member of Parliament for Argyllshire; 1868–1878	Succeeded by Lord Colin Campbell
Preceded by Sir Henry Roscoe	Member of Parliament for Manchester South; 1895–1900	Succeeded by Hon. William Peel
Government offices
Preceded by The Earl of Dufferin	Governor General of Canada; 1878–1883	Succeeded by The Marquess of Lansdowne
Honorary titles
Preceded by Prince Victor of Hohenlohe-Langenburg	Governor of Windsor Castle; 1892–1914	Succeeded by The Marquess of Cambridge
Preceded by The Duke of Argyll	Lord Lieutenant of Argyllshire; 1900–1914	Succeeded by The Marquess of Breadalbane
Peerage of Scotland
Preceded by George Campbell	Duke of Argyll; 1900–1914	Succeeded by Niall Campbell
Peerage of the United Kingdom
Preceded by George Campbell	Duke of Argyll; 1900–1914	Succeeded by Niall Campbell
