= John Campbell, 7th Duke of Argyll =

British politician

His Grace The Duke of Argyll FRS FRSE
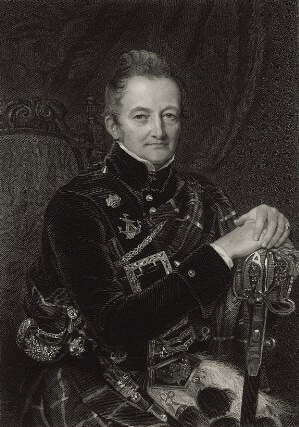
- Engraving of The 7th Duke of Argyll, c. 1843
- Predecessor: George Campbell, 6th Duke of Argyll
- Successor: George Campbell, 8th Duke of Argyll
- Other names: The Duke of Argyll
- Born: 21 December 1777
- Died: 25 April 1847 (aged 69)
- Wars and battles: French Revolutionary Wars
- Spouses: Elizabeth Campbell; Joan Glassel; Anne Cuninghame
- Issue: 3, including George
- Parents: John Campbell, 5th Duke of Argyll; Elizabeth Gunning

John Douglas Edward Henry Campbell, 7th Duke of Argyll, FRS, FRSE (21 December 1777 – 25 April 1847), known as Lord John Campbell until 1839, was a Scottish peer and Whig politician.

== Background ==
Campbell was born in London, the third son of John Campbell, 5th Duke of Argyll. His mother was Elizabeth Campbell, 1st Baroness Hamilton of Hameldon, who had been ennobled in her own right in 1776. Campbell was baptised on 18 January 1778 at St James's in Westminster. He was educated privately and later attended Christ Church, Oxford. In 1803, he travelled to Paris, where he met Talleyrand as well as Napoleon; Campbell returned to England the following year. He succeeded his elder brother George Campbell, 6th Duke of Argyll, in his titles in 1839.

== Career ==
Campbell was commissioned into the British Army in 1797 as an ensign of the 3rd Foot Guards, commanded by his father. He purchased a lieutenancy in 1799 and shortly afterwards became a captain. During the French Revolutionary Wars, Campbell served in the Netherlands under orders of Sir Ralph Abercromby. He retired in 1801 forced by ill health and after two years was appointed lieutenant-colonel and commandant of the Argyll Volunteers. Following the rearrangement of the country's militias in 1809, he became colonel of the Argyll and Bute Militia.

He entered the British House of Commons in 1799, having been elected for Argyllshire as replacement for his uncle Lord Frederick Campbell. After the Act of Union 1801, he continued to represent the constituency also in the new Parliament of the United Kingdom until 1822. He was elected a fellow of the Royal Society in 1819. Campbell was nominated Keeper of the Great Seal of Scotland in 1841, an office he held for the next five years.

== The British American Colonization Association ==
In 1841, the 7th Duke of Argyll, along with other British and Irish noblemen, established the British American Colonization Association, also known as the British American Association. This entity was involved in monetising the migration of foreign populations to British North America, which was not without controversy:

We adhere to the opinion we expressed when the affairs of this company were last year before the public. We consider that the Duke of Argyll, and every other individual whose name was affixed-with his own knowledge of its being so – to the delusive prospectus, are bound by humanity and justice to indemnify the sufferers by the failure of the scheme to which they gave the sanction of their names. We had hoped that a due sense of what the Duke of Argyll owes to society would have induced his Grace, and every other individual who was induced to give his sanction to the scheme, to have voluntarily paid the penalty of his folly. By not doing so, the public may be induced to suspect that it was something worse than error of judgment. which brought their names into such a connection. We also went further; and have seen no reason to retract the opinion we then expressed.

Upon bankruptcy of the association, it was established that the Duke of Argyll was aware of the economic bubble created by the association, which resulted in lost wages for workers, and non-existent provisions for the migrants who participated in his colonization scheme.

== Marriages and children ==
Argyll married firstly Elizabeth, eldest daughter of William Campbell against the wishes of his father in 1802. They were divorced six years later having had no children.

Argyll married Joan, only daughter of John Glassel in 1820. They had three children:

- John Henry Campbell (11 January 1821 – 27 May 1837)
- George Douglas Campbell, 8th Duke of Argyll (30 April 1823 – 24 April 1900) he married Lady Elizabeth Leveson-Gower (30 May 1824 – 25 May 1878) on 31 July 1844. They had twelve children. He remarried Amelia Claughton (12 April 1843 – 4 January 1894) on 13 August 1881. He remarried, again, Ina McNeill on 30 July 1895
- Lady Emma Augusta Campbell (1825 – 30 May 1893) she married Rt. Hon. Sir John McNeill on 26 August 1870.

After his second wife's death in 1828, Argyll married thirdly Anne, eldest daughter of John Cuninghame in 1831. She was the widow of George Cunningham Monteath.

Argyll died, aged 69, in Inveraray Castle in Argyllshire and was buried at Kilmun Parish Church. Having been predeceased by his older son John in 1837, he was succeeded in the dukedom and his other titles by his second son George. He was survived by his third wife until 1874.

== Notes ==
Parliament of Great Britain
Preceded by Lord Frederick Campbell	Member of Parliament for Argyllshire; 1799 – 1801	Succeeded by Parliament of the United Kingdom
Parliament of the United Kingdom
Preceded by Parliament of Great Britain	Member of Parliament for Argyllshire; 1801 – 1822	Succeeded by Walter Frederick Campbell
Political offices
Preceded by The Earl of Stair	Keeper of the Great Seal of Scotland; 1841–1846	Succeeded by The Earl of Stair
Peerage of Scotland
Preceded by George Campbell	Duke of Argyll; 1839–1847	Succeeded by George Campbell
