= Sherlock Holmes Baffled =

1900 film by Arthur Marvin

- Complete 30-second Mutoscope film
- Directed by: Arthur Marvin
- Cinematography: Arthur Marvin
- Distributed by: American Mutoscope and Biograph Company
- Release date: May 1, 1900
- Running time: 30 seconds
- Country: United States
- Language: Silent

Sherlock Holmes Baffled is an American silent trick film created in 1900 with cinematography by Arthur Marvin. It is the earliest known film to feature Arthur Conan Doyle's detective character Sherlock Holmes, albeit in a form unlike that of later screen incarnations. In the film, a thief who can appear and disappear at will steals a sack of items from Sherlock Holmes. At each point, Holmes' attempts to thwart the intruder end in failure.

Originally shown in Mutoscope machines in arcades, Sherlock Holmes Baffled has a running time of 30 seconds. Although produced in 1900, it was only registered in 1903, and a copyright notice stating this is seen on some prints. The identities of the actors playing the first screen Holmes and his assailant are not recorded. Assumed to be lost for many years, the film was rediscovered in 1968 as a paper print in the Library of Congress.

== Plot ==
Sherlock Holmes enters his drawing room to find it being burgled, but on confronting the villain is surprised when the latter disappears. Holmes initially attempts to ignore the event by lighting a cigar, but upon the thief's reappearance, Holmes tries to reclaim the sack of stolen goods, drawing a pistol from his dressing gown pocket and firing it at the intruder, who vanishes. After Holmes recovers his property, the bag vanishes from his hand into that of the thief, who promptly disappears through a window. At this point, the film ends abruptly with Holmes looking "baffled".

== Production ==
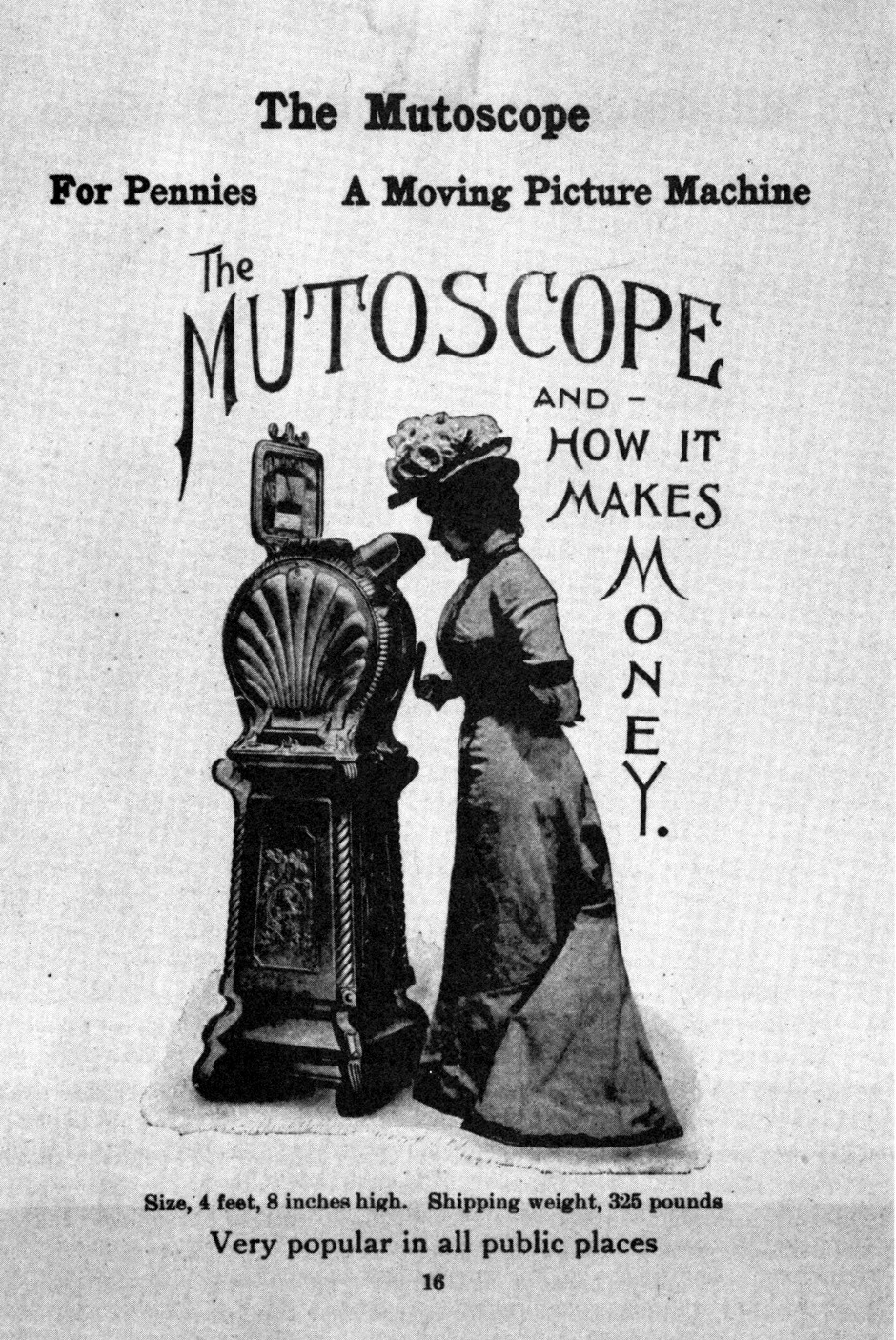
An 1899 trade advertisement for the Mutoscope

The film was produced by the American Mutoscope and Biograph Company and was intended to be shown on the Mutoscope, an early motion picture device, patented by Herman Casler in 1894. Like Thomas Edison's Kinetoscope the Mutoscope did not project on a screen, and provided viewing to only one person at a time. Cheaper and simpler than the Kinetoscope, the system marketed by the American Mutoscope Company quickly dominated the coin-in-the-slot "peep-show" business.

The Mutoscope worked on the same principle as a flip book, with individual image frames printed onto flexible cards attached to a circular core which revolved with the turn of a user-operated hand crank. The cards were lit by electric light bulbs inside the machine, a system devised by Arthur Marvin's brother, Henry, one of the founders of the Biograph company. Earlier machines had relied on reflected natural light.

To avoid violating Edison's patents, Biograph cameras from 1895 to 1902 used a large-format film measuring 2-23/32 inches (68 mm) wide, with an image area of 2 × 2½ inches, four times that of Edison's 35 mm format. Biograph film was not ready-perforated; the camera itself punched a sprocket hole on each side of the frame as the film was exposed at 30 frames per second. Sherlock Holmes Baffled ran to 86.56 metres in length, giving the film a running time of 30 seconds (although in practice, due to the hand-cranked gearing of the Mutoscope this would have varied).

The director and cinematographer of Sherlock Holmes Baffled was Arthur Weed Marvin, a staff cameraman for Biograph. Marvin completed over 418 short films between 1897 and 1911, and was known for filming vaudeville entertainers. He later became known as the cameraman for the early silent films of D. W. Griffith. The identities of the first screen Holmes and his assailant are not recorded.

Biograph films before 1903 were mostly actualities (documentary footage of actual persons, places and events), but Sherlock Holmes Baffled is an example of an early Biograph comedy narrative film, produced at the company's rooftop studio on Broadway in New York City. According to Christopher Redmond's Sherlock Holmes Handbook, the film was shot on April 26, 1900. Julie McKuras states that the film was released in May of the same year. Despite being in circulation, Sherlock Holmes Baffled was only registered on February 24, 1903, and this is the date seen on the film's copyright title card. The occasionally suggested date of 1905 is probably due to confusion with a Vitagraph film titled Adventures of Sherlock Holmes; or, Held for Ransom (1905).

== Rediscovery ==
The film was assumed to have been lost for many years until a paper copy was identified in 1968 in the Library of Congress Paper Print archive by Michael Pointer, a historian of Sherlock Holmes films. Because motion pictures were not covered by copyright laws until 1912, paper prints were submitted by studios wishing to register their works. These were made using light-sensitive paper of the same width and length as the film itself, and developed as though a still photograph. Both the Edison Company and the Biograph Company submitted entire motion pictures as paper prints, and it is in this form that most of them survive. The film has subsequently been transferred to 16 mm film in the Library of Congress collection.

== Analysis ==
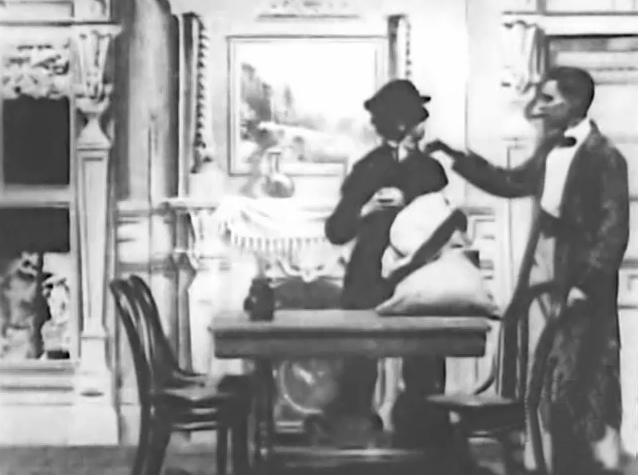
Holmes first encounters the intruder.

The plot of Sherlock Holmes Baffled is unrelated to Sir Arthur Conan Doyle's canonical Sherlock Holmes stories; it is likely that the character's name was used purely for its familiarity with the public. Shot from a single point of view on a stage set, the intention of Sherlock Holmes Baffled was probably to act as a showcase for basic film trickery and film editing effects, particularly the stop trick first developed four years earlier in 1896 by French director Georges Méliès.

Sherlock Holmes Baffled marks the first in an observable trend of early film-makers to show the character as a figure of fun; in this case the somewhat louchely dressed Holmes is left "baffled" by a burglar, in contrast with the detective prowess displayed by his literary namesake. William K. Everson in his book The Detective in Film noted that Sherlock Holmes Baffled, in common with all other silent detective films "labored under the difficulty of not being able to conduct prolonged interrogations or oral deductions ... the stress was on mystery or physical action rather than on literary-derived sleuthings." It was only in 1916 that William Gillette's Sherlock Holmes attempted a serious adaptation of Conan Doyle's character. Michael Pointer has suggested that the appearance and costume of the anonymous actor in Sherlock Holmes Baffled is an imitation of Gillette's stage portrayal of Holmes. Gillette's play Sherlock Holmes had made its Broadway debut at the Garrick Theater on November 6, 1899.

Michael Pointer's report on the rediscovery of Sherlock Holmes Baffled in 1968 stated "it is an early trick film clearly made for viewing on a mutoscope or peepshow machine. Although a tiny, trivial piece, it is historic as being the earliest known use of Sherlock Holmes in moving pictures." It has been posited that Sherlock Holmes has become the most prolific screen character in the history of cinema.

== See also ==
- List of rediscovered films
- 1900 in film
