= Mutoscope cards =

Mutoscope cards were still images, typically of pin-up material, printed on cards and sold through vending machines. Their dimensions were 5 1/4-by-3 1/4-inch (13.3 cm × 8.3 cm) and they were published during the 1940s by the International Mutoscope Reel Company and other firms. They are not individual pictures from Mutoscope reels and have no connection whatsoever to the Mutoscope motion-picture device. All carry the inscription "A Mutoscope card." They were sold from coin-operated vending machines in places such as amusement parks. Most Mutoscope cards are of pin-up material, but some featured other kinds of images such as Jimmy Hatlo cartoons.

In the literature of cinematography, the phrase "Mutoscope cards" is also used to refer to the individual cards comprising a Mutoscope reel, corresponding to individual frames of the original film from which the reel was produced.

Mutoscope cards were collectible trading cards from a repertoire of 496 cards that were published by the American firm Exhibit Trading Company in ten sets between 1940 and 1954. Reference: Pin-Ups, Night and Day, Flammarion, S.A., Paris, 2015.
