= Adventures of Sherlock Holmes; or, Held for Ransom =

1905 film by J. Stuart Blackton

- Directed by: J. Stuart Blackton
- Written by: Theodore Liebler Jr. Arthur Conan Doyle (characters)
- Starring: H. Kyrle Bellew; J. Barney Sherry
- Distributed by: Vitagraph Studios
- Release date: October 7, 1905
- Running time: 1 reel (725 feet)
- Country: United States
- Language: Silent film

Adventures of Sherlock Holmes; or, Held for Ransom is a 1905 American silent film directed by J. Stuart Blackton for Vitagraph Studios. It was the second film based on Arthur Conan Doyle's Sherlock Holmes stories, following the 1900 Mutoscope trick film Sherlock Holmes Baffled, and is usually regarded as the first attempt to film a "serious" Holmes adaptation. The scenario was by Theodore Liebler based on elements of Conan Doyle's 1890 novel The Sign of the Four.

Robert Pohle notes that "Deprived of his voice in those early silent films, Holmes was also transformed from an intellectual, armchair detective into a more kinetic action figure—almost a sort of cowboy-in-deerstalker."

Although sometimes considered a lost film, fragments are still extant in the Library of Congress paper print collection. The film was shot on 35mm black-and-white film, running to one reel of 725 feet in length.

== Cast ==
The film was released on October 7, 1905, with H. Kyrle Bellew and J. Barney Sherry in unlisted roles. It was long believed that the film starred Maurice Costello as Sherlock Holmes, but Leslie S. Klinger has written that the identification of Costello in the role is flawed. Klinger states that the first identification of Costello with the role was in Michael Pointer's Public Life of Sherlock Holmes published in 1975 but Pointer later realized his error and wrote to Klinger, stating:

"I am now aware that Maurice Costello could not have been in that film, as he had not joined the Vitagraph company by that date. I'm sorry that my book has been misleading, but I doubt that I shall have the opportunity for an amended reprint, and should not have the time to prepare one anyway."
