= Flip book =

Optical toy

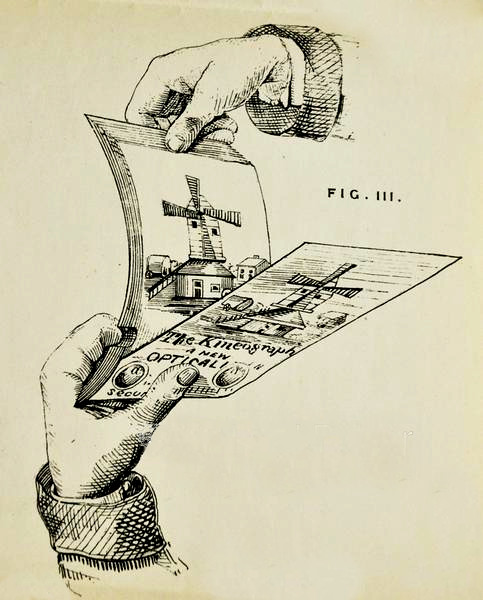
illustration of the Kineograph in Linnett's 1868 patent

A flip book, flipbook, flicker book, or kineograph is a booklet with a series of images that very gradually change from one page to the next, so that when the pages are viewed in quick succession, the images appear to animate by simulating motion or some other change. Often, flip books are illustrated books for children, but may also be geared toward adults and employ a series of photographs rather than drawings. Flip books are not always separate books, but may appear as an added feature in ordinary books or magazines, frequently using the page corners. Software packages and websites are also available that convert digital video files into custom-made flip books.

== Functionality ==
Rather than "reading" left to right, a viewer simply stares at the same location of the images in the flip book as the pages turn. The booklet must be flipped through with enough speed for the illusion to work, so the standard way to "read" a flip book is to hold the booklet with one hand and flip through its pages with the thumb of the other hand. The German word for flip book—Daumenkino, which translates to "thumb cinema"—reflects this process, the photographic progression integral to film.

An example of a flip book being used

== History ==
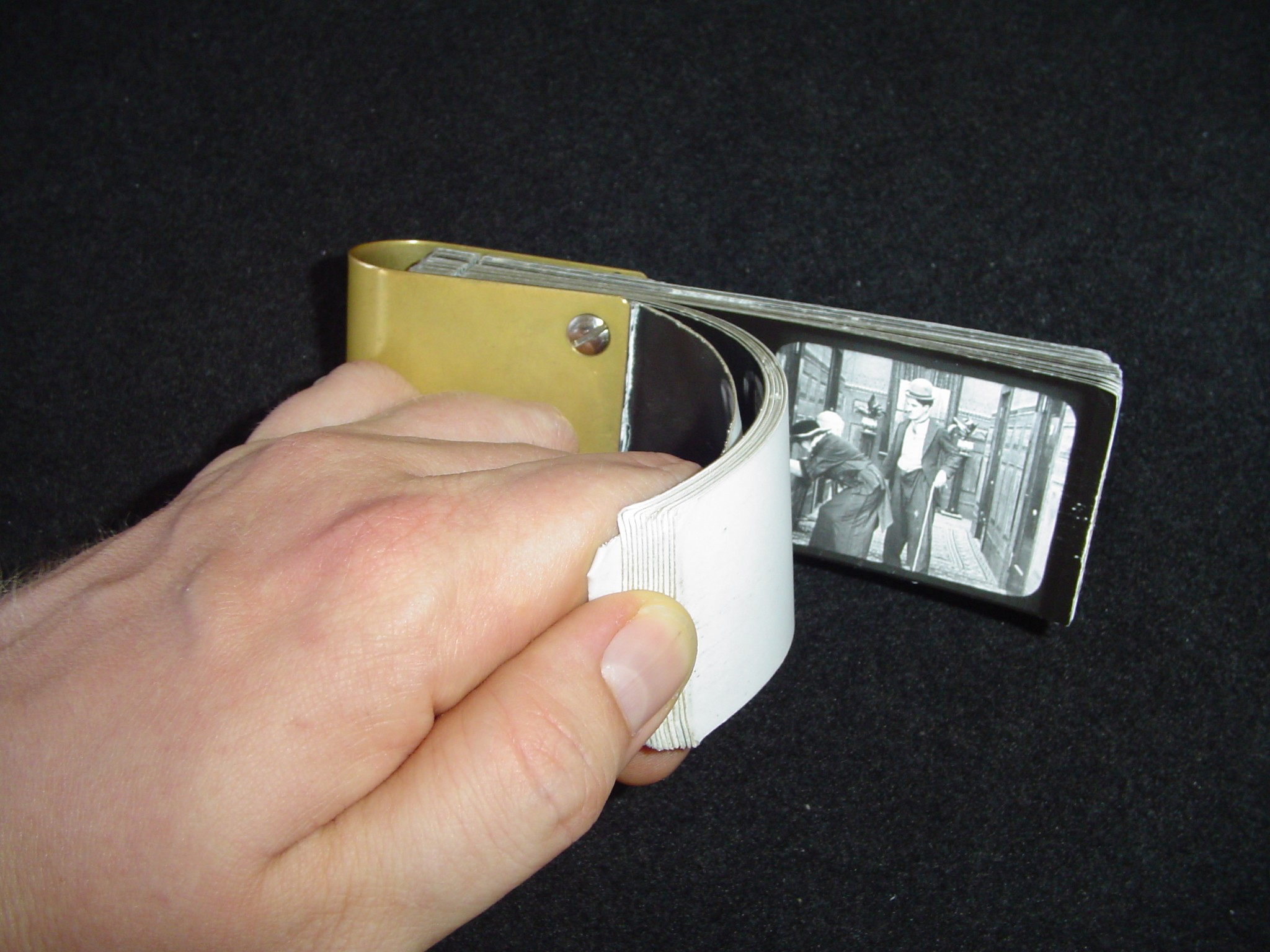
A flip book

There are some medieval illuminated books with sequential images, such as Sigenot (circa 1470). The illustrations in Sigenot are consistently framed and have short intervals between different phases of action, but the images cannot produce the illusion of a fluent motion. The necessary notion of instances smaller than a second would not really develop before the nineteenth century.

The oldest known documentation of the flip book appeared on 18 March 1868, when it was patented by John Barnes Linnett under the name Kineograph ("moving picture"). They were the first form of animation to employ a linear sequence of images rather than circular (as in the older phenakistoscope). The German film pioneer, Max Skladanowsky, first exhibited his serial photographic images in flip book form in 1894, as he and his brother Emil did not develop their own film projector until the following year. In 1894, Herman Casler invented a mechanized form of flip book called the Mutoscope, which mounted the pages on a central rotating cylinder rather than binding them in a book. The mutoscope remained a popular attraction through the mid-twentieth century, appearing as coin-operated machines in penny arcades and amusement parks. In 1897, the English filmmaker Henry William Short marketed his "Filoscope", which was a flip book placed in a metal holder to facilitate flipping.

By 1948, an "automated multiple camera" for the production of "Pocket Movie flip book" portraits was marketed in the United States.

== In culture ==
A type of flip book figures prominently in the rise in fortunes of the fictional artist Tateh in Ragtime written by E. L. Doctorow and published in 1975 later included in the film and musical adaptations of the book.

The first international flip book festival was held in 2004, by the Akademie Schloss Solitude in Stuttgart. Another international flip book festival was held in Linz, Austria in 2005.

Since 2007, Walt Disney Animation Studios has started its films with a production logo that initially evokes a flip book. It starts with a view of an empty page of paper, then as the pages start to turn, details are drawn in to reveal Mickey Mouse in Steamboat Willie.

In 2010, Hungary postal services released a flip book of stamps depicting a moving gömböc. The Israel Philatelic Federation released an "Israeli Animation Stamp Booklet" in November 2010 with 15 stamps designed by Mish to be animated when flipping the pages. It commemorated the 50th anniversary of ASIFA, the 25th anniversary of ASIFA Israel, and the "Flip Book 250th Anniversary".

The Finnish passport design released in 2012 contains a flip book of a walking moose.

== See also ==
- Electrotachyscope
- Flip page
- Mutoscope
- Praxinoscope
- Stop motion
- Strobe light
- Thaumatrope
- Zoetrope
- Zoopraxiscope
