= What the Butler Saw (mutoscope) =

Erotic film dating from the early 1900s

What the Butler Saw is a mutoscope reel and an early example of erotic films dating from the early 1900s. It depicted a scene of a woman partially undressing in her bedroom, as if some voyeuristic "butler" were watching her through a keyhole. The film was seen by depositing a coin in a freestanding viewing machine, which then freed a hand-crank on the side which was turned by the viewer. Social standards are subject to change, and by the 1950s this and similar films were considered harmless when compared to contemporary erotica.

The title of this feature became widely used in Britain as a generic term for devices and films of this type. The phrase had entered British popular culture after the 1886 divorce case of Lord Colin Campbell and Gertrude Elizabeth Blood. The trial hinged on whether their butler could have seen Lady Colin in flagrante with Captain Shaw of the Metropolitan Fire Brigade, through the keyhole of their dining room at 79 Cadogan Place, London.
