= Gertrude Elizabeth Blood =

Irish writer (1857–1911)

Lady Colin Campbell
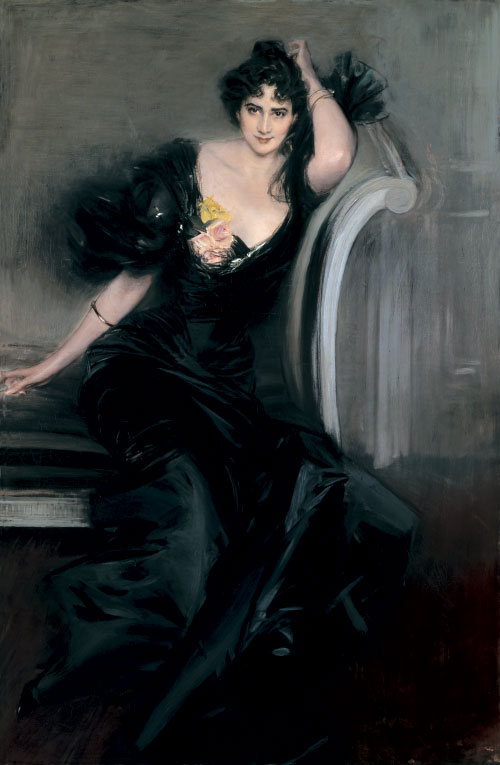
- Portrait of Lady Colin Campbell, by Giovanni Boldini (1897)
- Born: Gertrude Elizabeth Blood; 3 May 1857; Dublin, Ireland
- Died: 1 November 1911 (aged 54); London, England
- Occupations: Journalist, author, playwright, and editor
- Spouse: Lord Colin Campbell (m. 1881; died 1895)

Gertrude Elizabeth, Lady Colin Campbell (née Blood; 3 May 1857 – 1 November 1911) was an Irish-born journalist, author, playwright, and editor. She was married to Lord Colin Campbell, a brother-in-law of Princess Louise, Queen Victoria's fourth daughter.

== Early life ==
Her parents were Irish landowner Edmund Maghlin Blood (1815, Brickhill, County Clare – 1891, Chelsea, London) and Mary Amy Fergusson (1815, Leixlip, County Kildare – 8 October 1899, Chelsea, London) who had married in 1851. The Blood family had held estates in County Clare since the reign of Elizabeth I. Edmund and Mary produced three children: Neptune William (born 7 July 1853), Mary Beatrice (born c. 1855) and Gertrude Elizabeth.

== Marriage ==
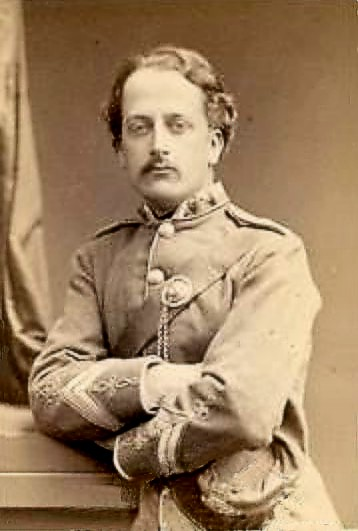
Lord Colin Campbell, 1890

Gertrude, a statuesque dark-eyed and celebrated beauty, met Lord Colin Campbell in October 1880 while visiting friends in Scotland, and they had become engaged within days. The couple married on 21 July 1881.

Lord Colin had been born on 9 March 1853, the fifth son of George Douglas Campbell, 8th Duke of Argyll and Lady Elizabeth Georgiana Sutherland-Leveson-Gower. He graduated as a Bachelor of Laws (LL.B.), was the Member of Parliament for Argyllshire from 1878 to 1885, and started practising as a barrister in 1886.

The wedding had been twice postponed by Lord Colin because of his health issues, and when he proposed an antenuptial agreement, requiring being nursed until his doctor felt that he was well enough to consummate the marriage, Edmund Blood suspected the worst and openly inquired whether Lord Colin was suffering from "that loathsome disease", a euphemism for a sexually transmitted infection. Gertrude's mother, though, wanted wedding plans to proceed, perhaps because it would provide an entrée to what she regarded as elevated social circles. The Duke of Argyll opposed the match, feeling that his son would be marrying below his station.

The wedding took place in July 1881, the Campbells subsequently taking up residence at 79 Cadogan Place in London. It was later discovered that Lord Colin did indeed have a venereal disease and had infected Gertrude. It is generally assumed that he had syphilis, but there is no conclusive proof as to the nature of the disease.

== Separation and divorce ==
Gertrude was granted a judicial separation from Lord Colin in 1884 (later upheld on appeal), on the grounds of cruelty, that he had knowingly infected her.

In late 1884, both parties filed for divorce, although the trial did not take place until the end of 1886. Lord Colin accused his wife of adultery, citing four names: George Spencer-Churchill, the son of the 7th Duke of Marlborough and a notorious adulterer; Sir Eyre Shaw, the chief of the Metropolitan Fire Brigade; Sir William Butler, noted soldier, adventurer and author; and Thomas Bird, the physician who had treated both Lord and Lady Campbell. William Court Gully, future Speaker of the House of Commons, acted as his counsel. Gertrude was defended by Sir Charles Russell.

Harry Furniss, the illustrator, was kept busy during the notorious trial, producing numerous portraits of the personalities involved for the daily newspapers. Proceedings included a visit by the jury to the Campbells' London home to verify the butler's testimony about witnessing through a keyhole Lady Colin's meetings with other men. With her divorce denied, the couple remained married until Lord Colin's death in 1895 of his "loathsome disease". In Great Britain, mutoscopes became known as "What the Butler Saw" machines in reference to the case.

The Blood parents lived a private life that changed significantly during their daughter's divorce trial. The trial received a lot of public attention because of the personal details which were shared during the case.

Christabel Pankhurst said of the fact that Gertrude Blood had been denied a divorce: "According to man-made law a wife who is even once unfaithful to her husband has done him an injury which entitles him to divorce her... On the other hand, a man who consorts with prostitutes, and does this over and over again throughout his married life, has, according to man-made law, been acting only in accordance with human nature, and nobody can punish him for that."

== Later life ==
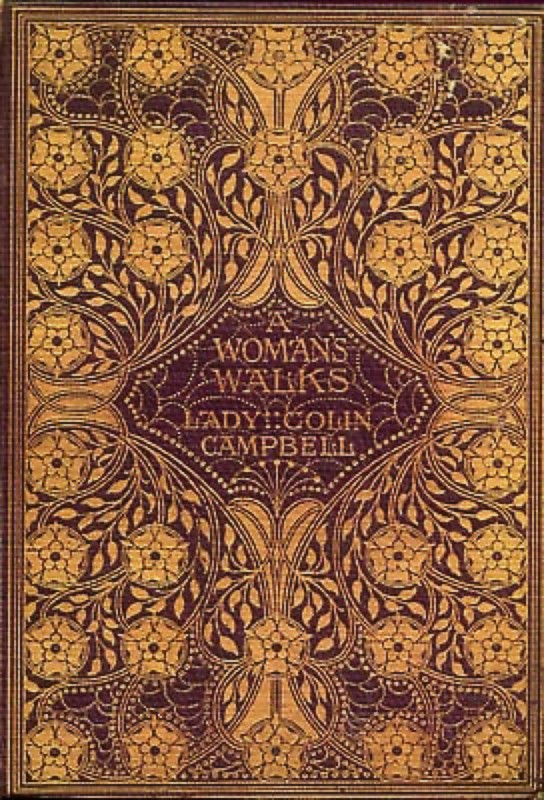
Cover of A Woman's Walks, 1903 edition

With the trial over, Blood set about reshaping her life. She had always been fond of writing and turned easily to journalism, writing columns on art and travel, fashion, music and the theatre, sport and fishing – one of her favourite pastimes. Her other talents included painting, riding, cycling, swimming, a fine singing voice, an excellent command of French and Italian (which she had spoken long before being introduced to English), a bit of German, Spanish and Arabic, and was recognised as an expert fencer. She contributed regularly to the columns of the Saturday Review and the Pall Mall Gazette and later edited the Ladies Field. During her career she used the pseudonyms "Véra Tsaritsyn", "G. E. Brunefille" and "Q.E.D."

Although ostracised by the very society of which she had longed to be part – they had closed ranks when it became apparent that a member of their set was being publicly challenged – her vivaciousness, liberal outlook, creativity and acerbic wit made her a welcome addition to literary and artistic circles. She was a confidante of Whistler who described her from his first meeting as "the very handsome and exceedingly amiable lady", and George Bernard Shaw saw her as a goddess. Her relationship with Frank Harris and Oscar Wilde, whom she called "the great white slug", was less cordial. She posed for Whistler for his painting Harmony in White and Ivory: Portrait of Lady Colin Campbell, which was lost or deliberately destroyed, and commissioned a portrait from Frank Duveneck, whose future wife, the artist Elizabeth Otis Lyman Boott (1846–1888), was also a close friend. Gertrude knew Duveneck well enough to secretly send some of his Venetian etchings to the New Society's first exhibition in 1881. She was regarded as eccentric and Augustus Hare records that she "wore a live snake around her throat in hot weather because it keeps one's neck so cool". In her column of 20 October 1897 in The World, she wrote a piece entitled Modern Gladiators, under the name "Véra Tsaritsyn", about attending the screening of a silent film at the Aquarium in London. The film covered the World Heavyweight Title clash at Carson City between James Corbett and Bob Fitzsimmons on 17 March 1897. Her description eulogises the physical clash and underlines her enjoyment of the sensual.

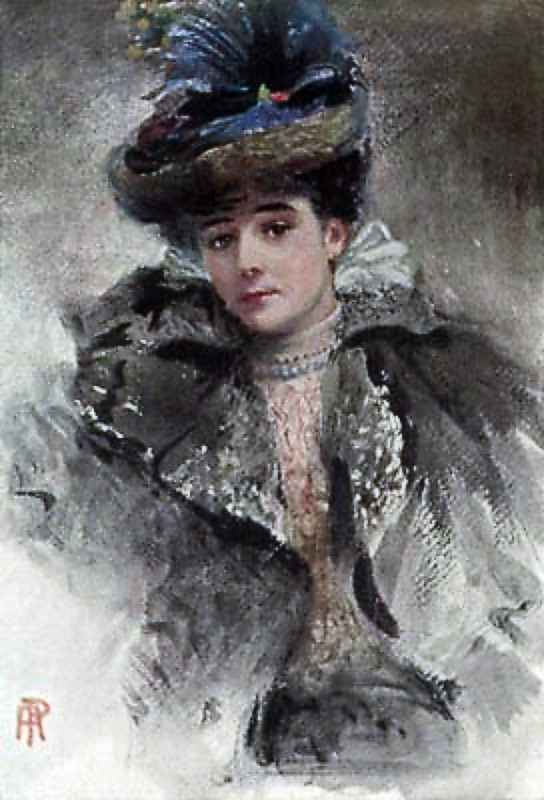
Lady Colin Campbell by Percy Anderson

Shaw noted in his diary on 17 October 1889, that he had written to Edmund Yates asking that he give the position of art critic at The World to Lady Colin Campbell. Shaw's easily readable art and music reviews appeared regularly in The World and The Star, but as his time was taken up in other ways, he would gladly resign from what he regarded as a bore. Much later he would write to Frank Harris, "From Lady Colin Campbell onward, I have been familiar with celebrated beauties and with what is by no means the same thing, really beautiful women."

Shaw interviewed her in 1893 and wrote:

"Imagine a lady with a lightning wit, a merciless sense of humour, a skill in journalism surpassing that of any interviewer, a humiliatingly obvious power of reckoning you up at a glance, and probably not thinking much of you, a superb bearing that brings out all the abjectness in your nature, and a beauty the mere fame of which makes you fall into an attitude of amateurishly gallant homage that fulfils the measure of your sneaking confusion. The custom is for the interviewer to describe the subject of an interview as his "victim". It is not possible to express how completely the tables were turned on this occasion." – George Bernard Shaw

Lady Colin Campbell died at Carlyle Mansions in London on 1 November 1911, of chronic rheumatism.

== Selected works ==
- Topo, A Tale About English Children in Italy London: Belfast, Marcus Ward & Co., 1876 under the nom-de-plume G. E. Brunefille, illustrated by Kate Greenaway
- A Book of the Running Brook and of Still Waters (1885)
- Darell Blake, a Study :Trischler (1889) – a novel
- Etiquette of Good Society (1893) (editor)
- The Lady's Dressing-Room (1893) (translator)
- A Woman's Walks – London: Eveleigh Nash, 1903 – a selection of essays first published in "The World"
- Bud and Blossom, a play
- St. Martin's Summer, a play with Clothilde Graves
- A Miracle in Rabbits

== Bibliography ==
- Anne Jordan Love Well the Hour: Life of Lady Colin Campbell (1857–1911): Matador (2010) ISBN 978-1-84876-611-2
- Gordon H. Fleming Lady Colin Campbell: Victorian "Sex Goddess": Windrush (1989) ISBN 0-900075-11-2
