= Portrait of Lady Colin Campbell =

Painting by Giovanni Boldini

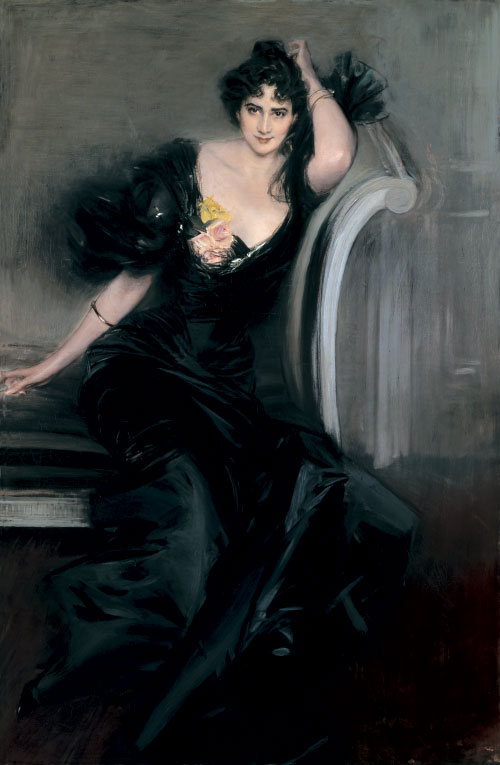
- Artist: Giovanni Boldini
- Year: c. 1894
- Medium: Oil on canvas
- Dimensions: 184.3 cm × 120.2 cm (72.6 in × 47.3 in)
- Location: National Portrait Gallery; London

The Portrait of Lady Colin Campbell is an oil on canvas painting by the Italian painter Giovanni Boldini, created c. 1894. It is held in the National Portrait Gallery, in London.

== History and description ==
Boldini portrays Gertrude Elizabeth Blood, otherwise known as Lady Colin Campbell, a famous Irish aristocrat, known for her beauty and intelligence, who was married to the Scottish nobleman, Lord Colin Campbell. Theirs however was a very unhappy marriage, sealed by the continuous infidelities of Colin, a usual visitor to London brothels. When Elizabeth suffered the shame of being contaminated with syphilis, contracted through sexual intercourse with her unfaithful husband, she accused him of adultery and immediately requested a divorce. The trial did not end well for the unfortunate lady, who had to wait for her husband's death to find solace. The abandonment of the marital home was a primary and decisive source of inspiration for Elizabeth, who that way was able to cultivate her literary and journalistic skills.

Boldini in this portrait uses an electrifying brushstroke that is able to convey the beauty and joie de vivre of the Irish lady. In the fascinating figure of Gertrude Elizabeth Blood, a woman who courageously denounced the hypocrisy and duplicity of the Victorian society, Boldini identified a prototype of female emancipation. In his work, the lady faces the observer with an uninhibited, determined, clear and disturbing gaze and smile. She presents herself as an interpreter of a rediscovered and exuberant femininity, no longer inhibited by bourgeois constraints but free to follow her most authentic self. The complexion of her skin is pale, milky, almost nacre, of a white that only an aristocrat like her most likely could have. Her wealth is also reiterated by the elegance of her sumptuous black satin dress, very swirling, adorned with a delicate bouquet of roses at the generous neckline. Her hair is also of a wavy black colour. She is presented seen from the front while sitting, with one hand resting on the back of the chaise longue that supports her head, while it seems to be gently touching her hair, and the other casually resting alongside her body.

As in most of Boldini's portraits, the painting gives the impression of an electrifying dynamism, also obtained with the use of an impalpable, vaporous, almost airy pictorial texture, where it can be noticed, the luministic fabric of the black dress, crossed by several reflections. Elizabeth's body, modeled by a rough and opulent light, seems almost transfigured into a timeless classical dimension. The color is instead deposited on the pictorial surface with rapid and vibrant brushstrokes, which in addition to outlining the woman's physiognomy (slightly off-center to the left), contribute to enhance it with a light and delicate background.
