= The Untamable Whiskers =

- Directed by: Georges Méliès
- Starring: Georges Méliès
- Release date: 1904
- Country: France
- Language: Silent

The Untamable Whiskers (French: Le Roi du maquillage, lit. 'The King of Makeup'), also known as The King of the Mackerel Fishers and Les Moustaches indomptables, is a 1904 French silent trick film directed by Georges Méliès. The film is a showpiece for Méliès himself, drawing quickfire sketches of various characters and magically transforming into them. This film was formerly considered lost until the historical value of the paper rolls was rediscovered in the vaults of the Library of Congress. Between 1953–1954, technology was developed to copy it back onto 16mm film, and it was later fully restored in the 1980s onto modern, high-quality 35mm safety film.

== Plot ==
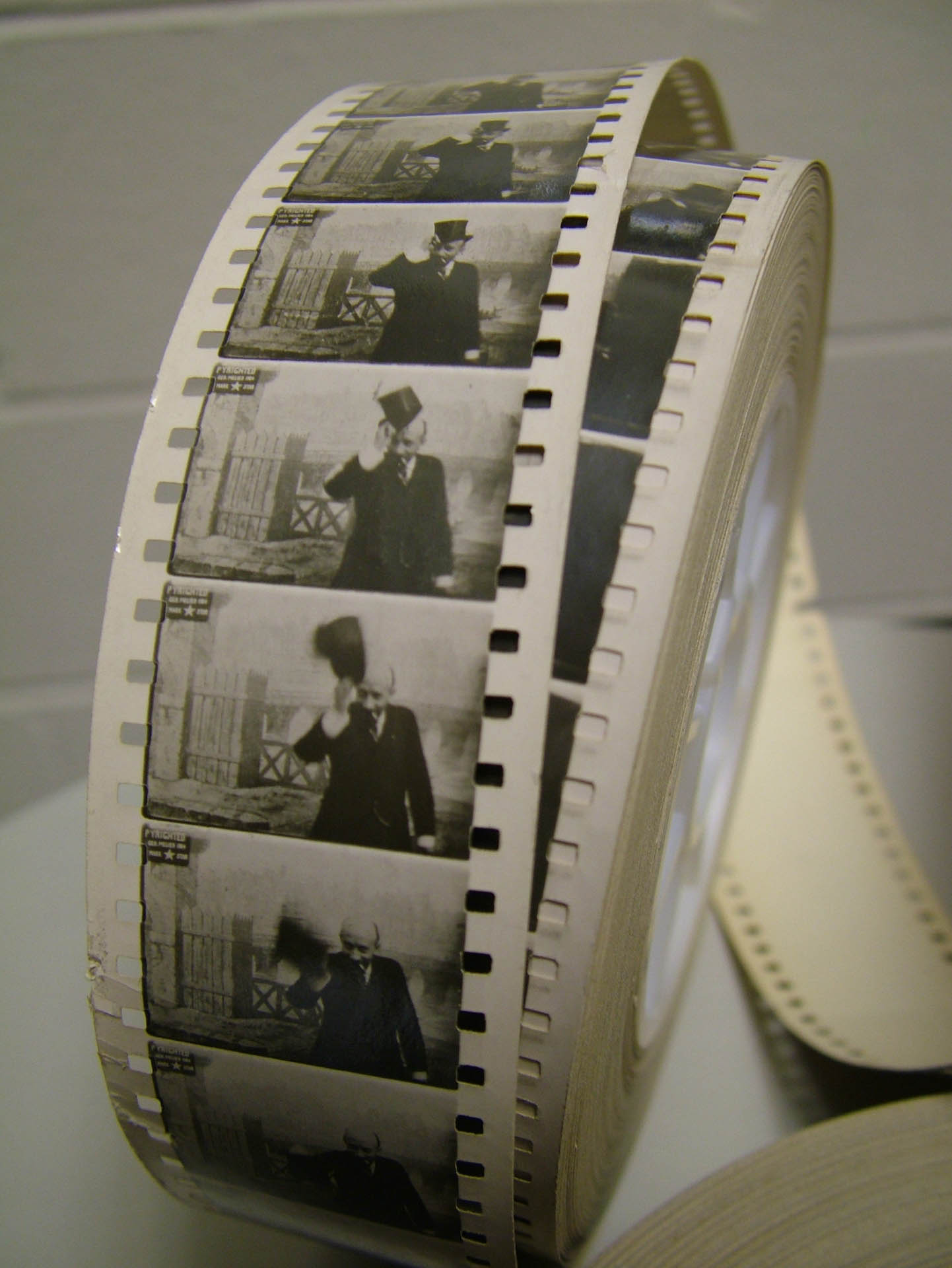
Paper print of The Untamable Whiskers

Georges Méliès, after greeting the audience, makes a rapid-fire chalkboard sketch of his head, but adding a long medieval wig. Striking a pose, a wig matching the drawing magically appears on his bald head. Next Méliès draws an elderly, heavily bearded man, and then a monocled gentleman with sideburns, magically transforming into each character. Writing "comic excentric" (a French phrase for an eccentric comedian) on the board, he next becomes a clown, then a whiskery naval type in a bicorne. Finally he transforms into the Devil and disappears into thin air.

== Production ==
Unusually for Méliès's work, The Untamable Whiskers is framed entirely in a medium shot. The film testifies to Méliès's skill at quick drawing; he had already put this skill to use in the A Lightning Sketch series, now presumed lost. The film's special effects depend on substitution splices and dissolves as well as on Méliès's talents for drawing, makeup, and character acting.

== Release ==
The film was released by Méliès's Star Film Company and is numbered 552–553 in its catalogues. It was sold in the United States as The Untamable Whiskers and in Britain as The King of the Mackerel Fishers, and is also known as Les Moustaches indomptables. Film critic William B. Parrill, reviewing European silent films in the 2010s, considered the film to show Méliès "in fine form. His zest in his series of comic transformations is almost palpable."
