= The Carlton Tower Jumeirah =

Hotel in London, England

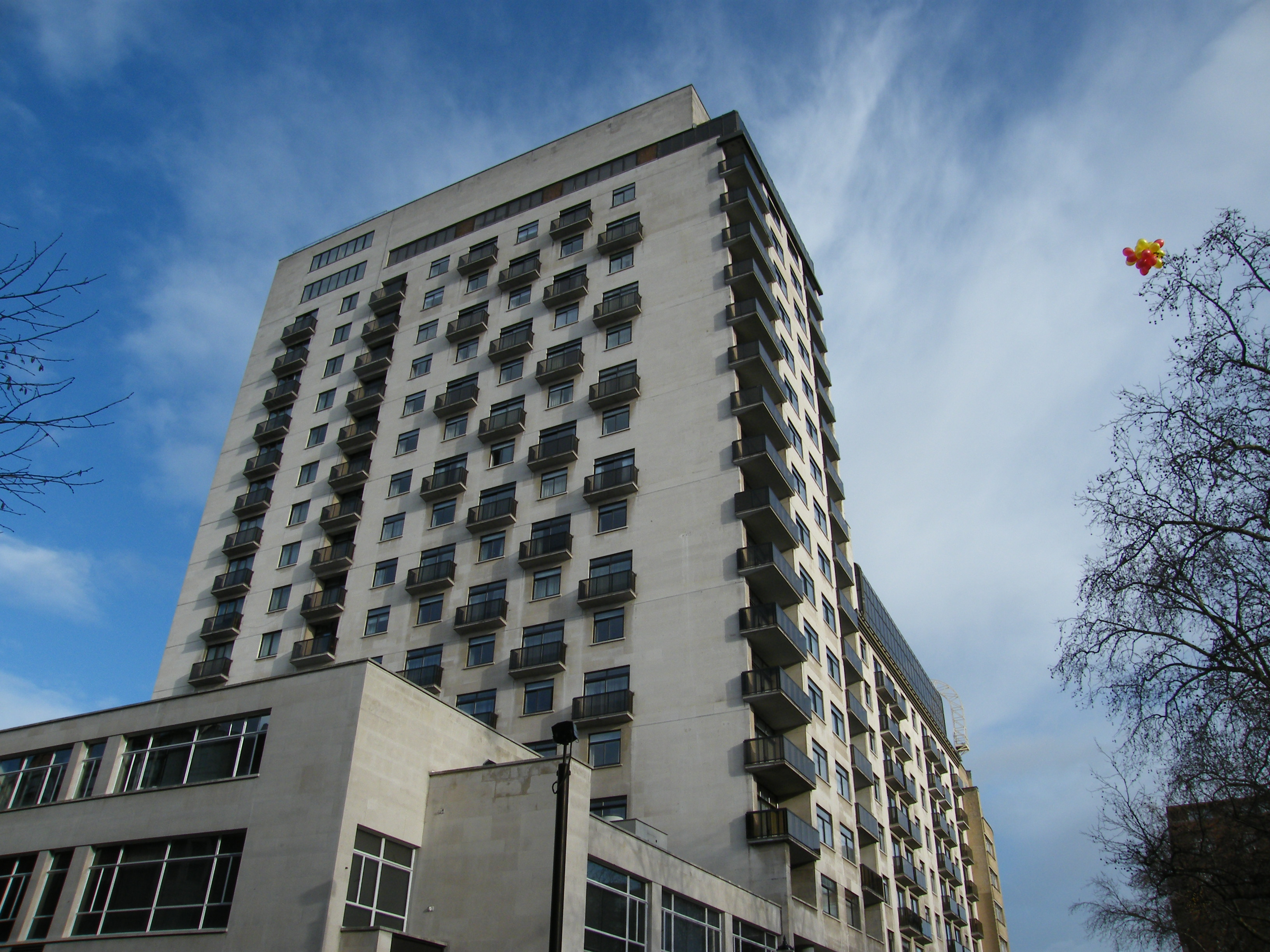

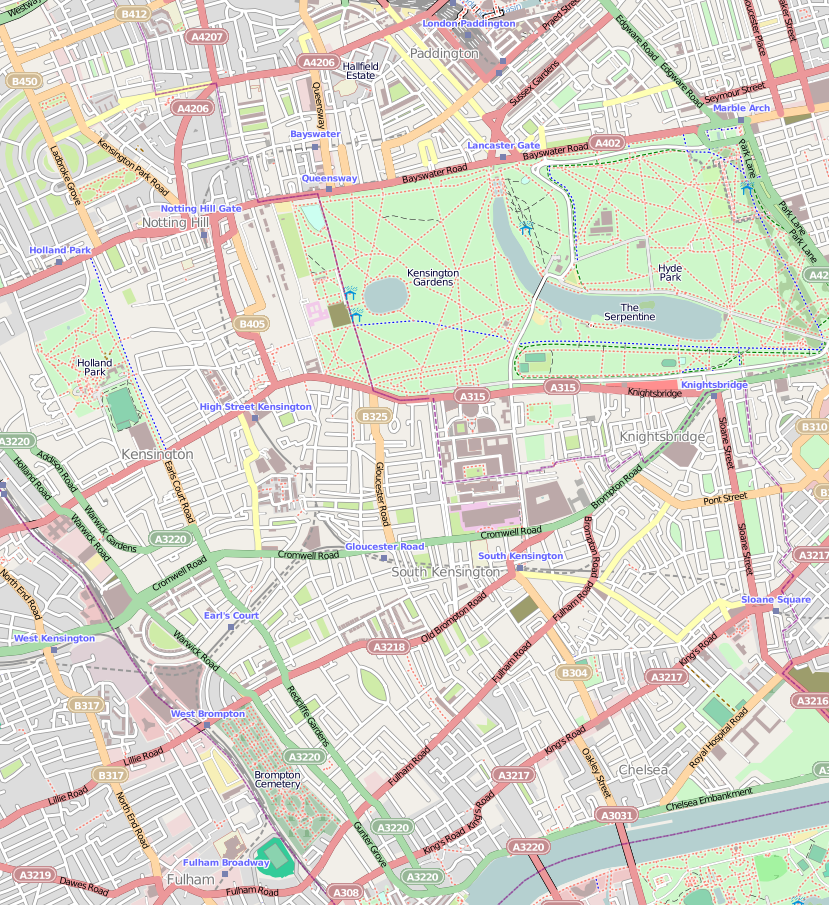
- Location within Kensington

General information
- Location: Cadogan Place, Knightsbridge, London, England
- Coordinates: 51°29′54″N 0°9′31″W
- Opened: 5 January 1961
- Owner: Dubai Holding
- Operator: Jumeirah

Technical details
- Floor count: 17

Other information
- Number of rooms: 186
- Number of suites: 88
- Number of restaurants: 2

Website
- Official website

The Carlton Tower Jumeirah is a 17-storey, 186-room and 88-suite luxury hotel in London, England. It is managed by the Emirati hotel operator Jumeirah.

== Location ==
The hotel is located on Cadogan Place next to Sloane Street and close to Hyde Park, Harrods, Harvey Nichols and central Knightsbridge. The closest London Underground station is Knightsbridge tube station.

The Carlton Tower Jumeirah is in close proximity to Jumeirah's other luxury hotel in London, Jumeirah Lowndes Hotel, in Lowndes Street.

== Amenities ==
As of February 2024, there are two restaurants in the hotel: Al Mare, an Italian restaurant overseen by head chef Marco Calenzo; and The Chinoiserie, an all-day dining restaurant. Jumeirah Lowndes offers another dining option, The Lowndes Belgravia.

The top floors of the hotel house The Peak Fitness Club & Spa, a 15,000 square foot health club offering equipment, fitness classes and a 20m swimming pool. The Peak Fitness Club & Spa was awarded AA Best UK Spa status in 2023. The hotel has two tennis courts.

== History ==
The hotel opened on 5 January 1961 as The Carlton Tower, managed by Hotel Corporation of America. In 1970, that chain was renamed Sonesta Hotels, and the hotel was briefly the Sonesta Tower. UK-based Lex Hotels assumed management in 1971, and the hotel regained its original name. In 1977, the hotel's owners, Prudential Assurance, sold the property to Proteus Hotels.

Hyatt Hotels assumed management in 1982, and the hotel was renamed the Hyatt Carlton Tower. When Hyatt's 20-year contract ran out, Jumeirah took over management in December 2001, and it was renamed Jumeirah Carlton Tower. In 2011, to celebrate its 50th year, the hotel published a history by Clive Aslet, "All That Life Can Afford".

In September 2019 the hotel closed for a £100 million renovation. It reopened in July 2021, rebranded slightly as The Carlton Tower Jumeirah.

The hotel was voted "Best UK Business Hotel" at the Conde Nast Reader's Travel Awards in 2008, and Conde Nast Middle East Readers’ Choice Awards 2013 - Best International Business Hotel.

The hotel was awarded "England's Best Business Hotel" at the World Travel Awards for three consecutive years, 2011 to 2013, and has been nominated every year since.

The hotel found itself amid controversy in 2009 when The Telegraph reported a banker's naked corpse was found by a member of staff.
