= International Mutoscope Reel Company =

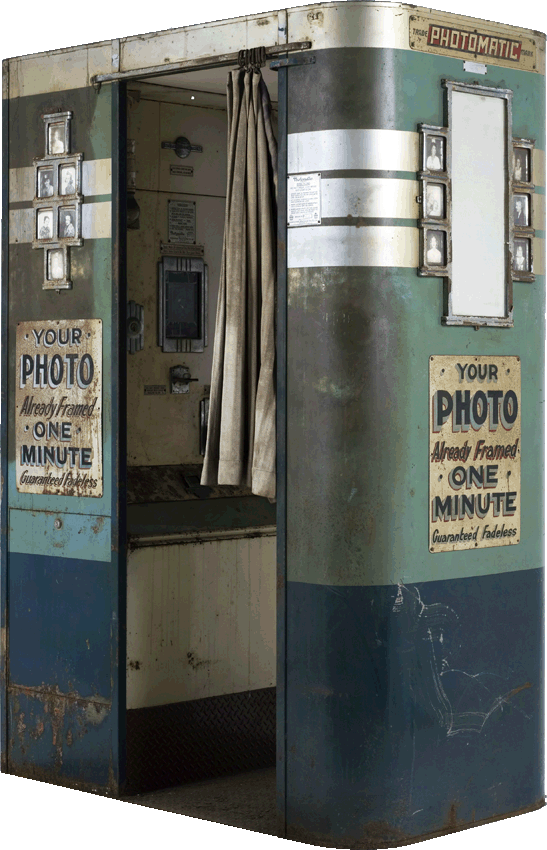
Photomatic picture booth from the International Mutoscope Corporation., circa 1939.

The International Mutoscope Reel Company was an American amusement arcade company. It were formed in the early 1920s, to produce Mutoscope machines and the motion picture reels that the machines played. They continued to manufacture arcade machines, including the claw machine as well as electro-mechanical games, until 1949.

== History ==
The mutoscope is a peep show-style movie viewer that was first manufactured by the American Mutoscope and Biograph company, and is notable for being one of the first means by which motion pictures were exhibited. The company gradually changed its focus to motion picture production and projection, and by the early 1920s, had stopped production of both mutoscopes and the movie reels that were played by the machines.

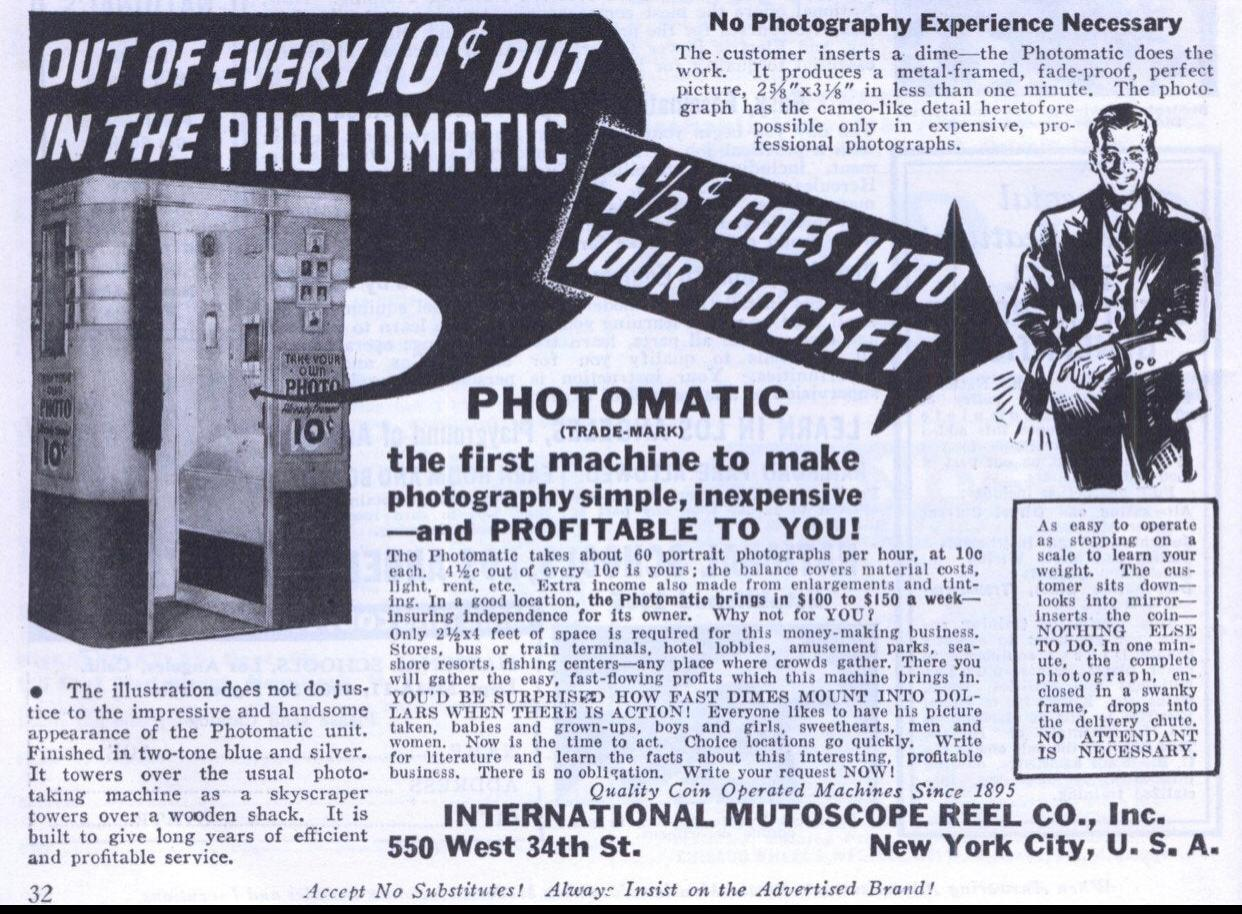
Photomatic advertisement for the picture booth from the International Mutoscope Reel Co., circa 1945.

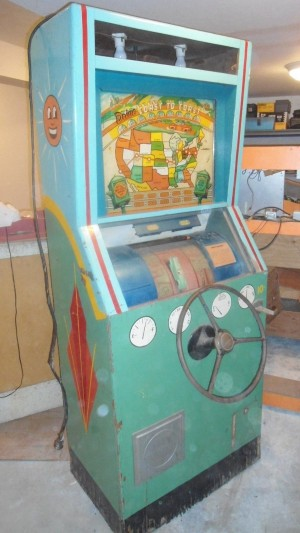
International Mutoscope Reel Co. Drive Mobile arcade game, circa 1940's.

Rather than allowing the format, still popular in arcades and amusement areas, to disappear, entrepreneur William Rabkin was given permission to continue producing mutoscope reels and machines using the trademarked name. By 1925, he had formed the International Mutoscope Reel Company for the purpose of manufacturing new movie reels to play on both the old mutoscope machines and the new ones that the company started selling. During the golden age of the penny arcade, the company produced a number of amusement machines, including fortune tellers and skill games, and may have been the first to market the claw machine.

== Photomatic ==
The company also produced arcade photo booths under the name of "Photomatic". These produced a souvenir 2-5/8" x 3-1/16" metal-framed photo with the credit on the back, "Taken by the Photomatic."

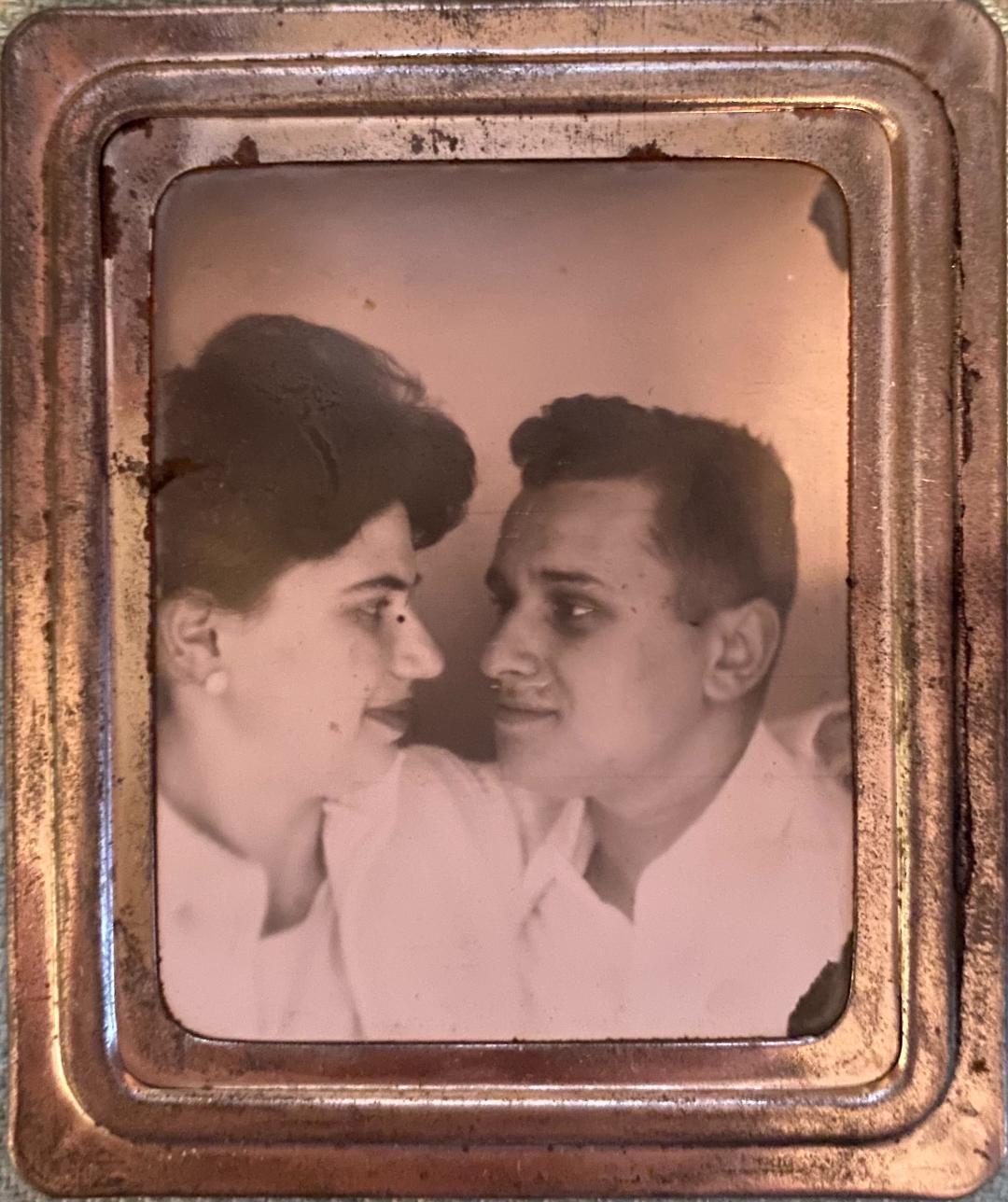
Photomatic souvenir photo and metal frame front view from the International Mutoscope Reel Co., circa 1957, Asbury Park, New Jersey. Pictured is Gerard Foschini and his wife Arlene.

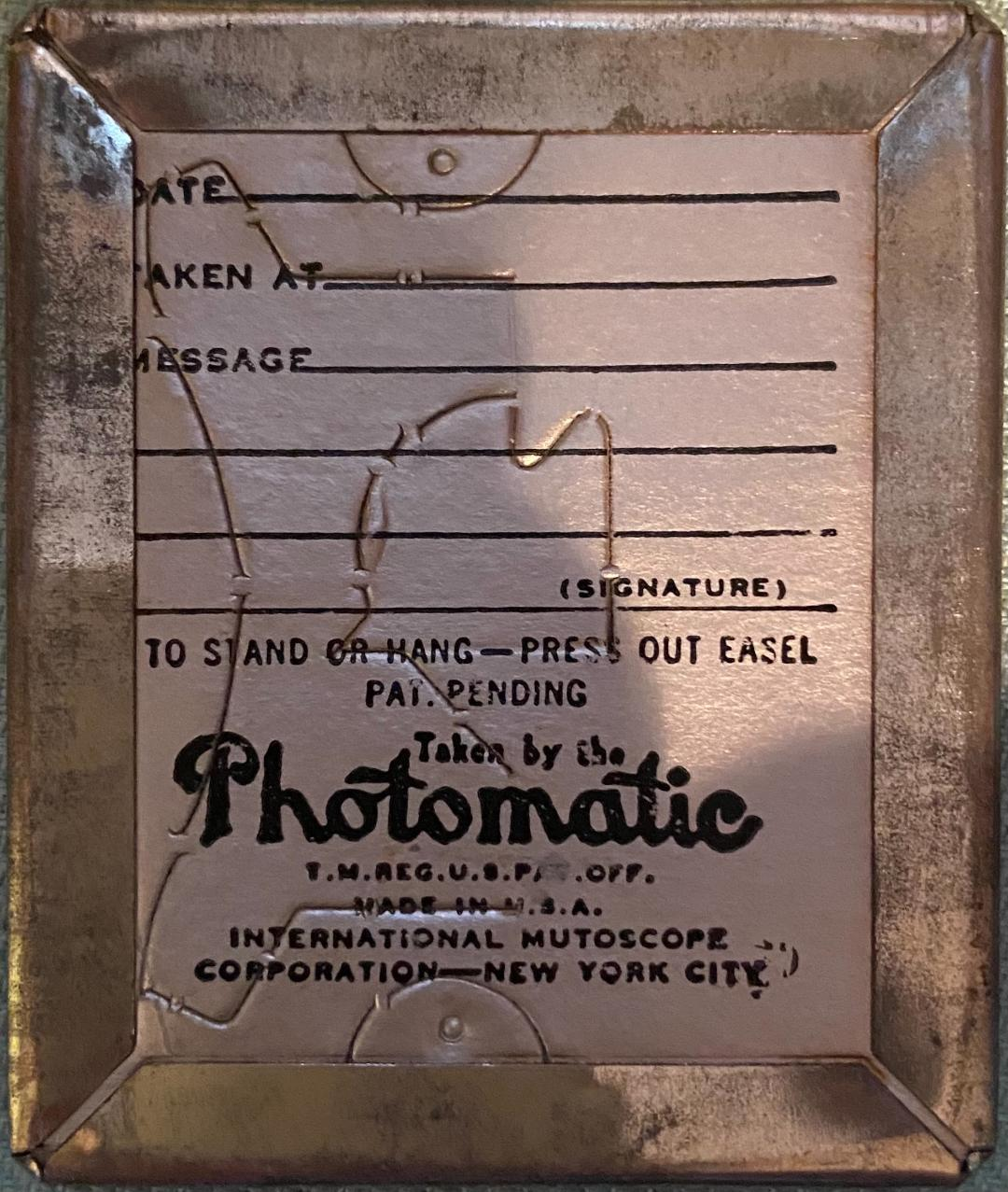
Photomatic souvenir photo and metal frame back view from the International Mutoscope Reel Co., circa 1957, Asbury Park, New Jersey.

== Arcade games ==
International Mutoscope Reel Company released various electro-mechanical games (EM games) for arcades in the 1940s. In 1941, International Mutoscope Reel Company they released the driving game Drive Mobile, which had an upright arcade cabinet similar to what arcade video games would later use. It was derived from older British driving arcade games from the 1930s. In Drive Mobile, a steering wheel was used to control a model car over a road painted on a metal drum, with the goal being to keep the car centered as the road shifts left and right. Kasco introduced this type of electro-mechanical driving game to Japan in 1958 with Mini Drive, which followed a similar format but had a longer cabinet allowing a longer road.

One of their last arcade EM games was K.O. Champ (1955), a boxing game that used a timer to create a sense of urgency in the gameplay.

== Demise ==
The company went out of business in 1949.

William Rabkin, the International Mutoscope founder, died in a fall from the window of his sixth floor apartment in 1956, possibly due to a dizzy spell brought on by high blood pressure.

== See also ==
- Mutoscope
