= Elias Bernard Koopman =

American businessman (1860–1929)

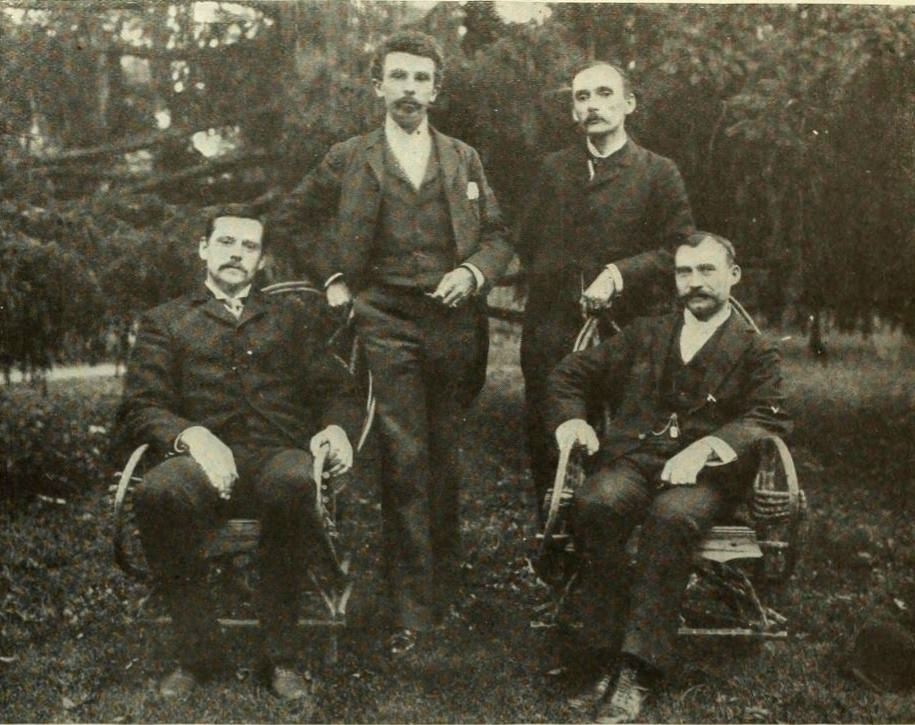
First meeting of the members of the K.M.C.D. Syndicate on September 22, 1895, from left: Henry Norton "Harry" Marvin, William Kennedy Laurie Dickson, Herman Casler, and Elias Bernard Koopman taken at the home of Harry Marvin, Canastota, New York

Elias Bernard Koopman (1860 – August 23, 1929) was an American businessman. He was a founder of the American Mutoscope and Biograph Company. He was also a founder of The Magic Introduction Company. He later headed the Runsyne Corporation, a maker of electrical signs.

== Biography ==
Koopman was born in 1860. In 1895, with William Kennedy Dickson, Herman Casler, and Harry Norton Marvin, he founded the American Mutoscope and Biograph Company.

He committed suicide by stabbing himself in the abdomen on August 23, 1929, aged 69, in the Hotel Cumberland. He was taken to the hospital while still alive, but he died a few hours later. He left a note for his brother, Harry Koopman telling him of his intentions. In the note he asked that his family not mourn for him. He also asked that his body be donated to science.

== Patents ==
- U.S. patent 414,058 pocket lamp
