= Biograph Company =

Defunct American film studio

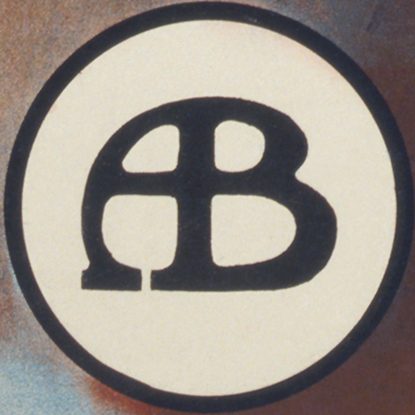
- Industry: Motion pictures
- Founded: 1895
- Founder: William Kennedy Dickson
- Defunct: 1916
- Headquarters: Broadway at 13th Street in Manhattan, New York City, United States
- Area served: United States, Europe
- Key people: Herman Casler (inventor); Henrey Norton "Harry" Marvin (inventor); Elias Koopman (businessman); D. W. Griffith (director); Mary Pickford (actress); Blanche Sweet (actress); Lillian Gish (actress); Lionel Barrymore (actor); Henry B. Walthall (actor)
- Products: Silent films

The Biograph Company (founded in 1895 as the American Mutoscope Company and later known as the American Mutoscope and Biograph Company) was an American motion picture company that produced films until 1916. A major producer of early silent films, it released more than 3,000 short films and 12 feature films.

The company played an important role in the development of silent cinema, particularly through the work of director D. W. Griffith. Its performers included Mary Pickford, Lillian Gish, and Lionel Barrymore. Following Griffith’s departure in 1913 and a delayed transition to feature-film production, Biograph declined and ceased producing new films in 1916, though it continued to reissue earlier films and lease its studio facilities.

== Founding ==
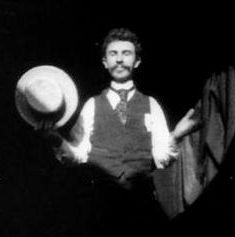
William Kennedy Dickson in 1891, later the founder of the Biograph Company, while working for Thomas A. Edison, prior to the formation of Dickson's own film studio

The company was started by William Kennedy Dickson, an inventor at Thomas Edison's laboratory who helped pioneer the technology of capturing moving images on film. Dickson left Edison in April 1895, joining with inventors Herman Casler, Harry Marvin and businessman Elias Koopman to incorporate the American Mutoscope Company in New Jersey on December 30, 1895. The firm manufactured the Mutoscope and made flip-card movies for it as a rival to Edison's Kinetoscope for individual "peep shows", making the company Edison's chief competitor in the nickelodeon market. In summer 1896, the Biograph projector was released, offering superior image quality to Edison's Vitascope projector. The company soon became a leader in the film industry, with distribution and production subsidiaries around the world, including the British Mutoscope Co. The company filmed the hanging of Edward Heinson in 1898 and released the film as An Execution by Hanging/Execution of Negro at County Jail, Jacksonville, Fla. In 1899, it changed its name to the American Mutoscope and Biograph Company, and in 1908 to simply the Biograph Company.

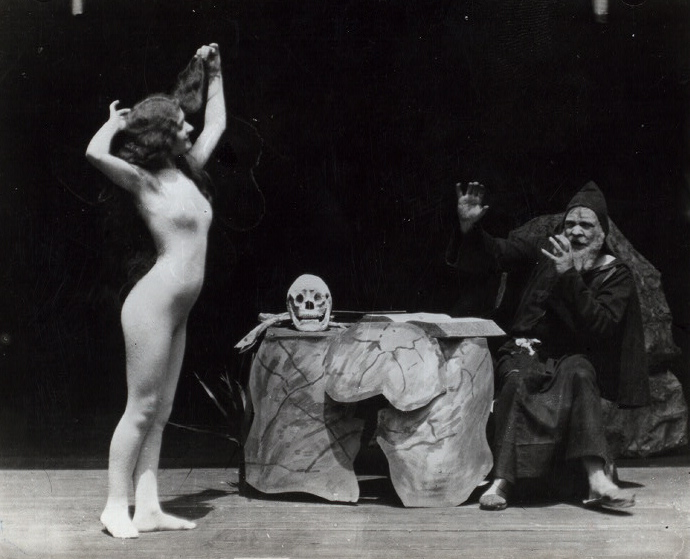
Still from Biograph's film The Temptation of St. Anthony (1900) with actress in body suit, a scene of simulated nudity in early American cinema decades before the creation of the Motion Picture Production Code

To avoid violating Edison's motion picture patents, Biograph cameras from 1895 to 1902 used a large-format film, measuring 2 23/32 inches (69 mm) wide, with an image area of 2 by 2 1/2 inches (51 mm × 64 mm), four times that of Edison's 35 mm format. The camera used friction feed instead of Edison's sprocket feed to guide the film to the aperture. The camera itself punched a sprocket hole on each side of the frame as the film was exposed at 30 frames per second. A patent case victory in March 1902 allowed Biograph and other producers and distributors to use the less expensive 35 mm format without an Edison license, although Biograph did not completely phase out 68 mm production until autumn of 1903. Biograph offered prints in both formats to exhibitors until 1905, when it discontinued the larger format. Commenting on the 1902 Biograph Company short film The Flying Train, Ashley Swinnerton of the Museum of Modern Art said that the 68 mm format has become "of particular interest to researchers ... because the large image area affords stunning visual clarity and quality."

Biograph films before 1903, were mostly "actualities," documentary film footage of actual persons, places and events, each film usually less than two minutes long, such as the one of the Empire State Express, which premiered on October 12, 1896, in New York City. It produced a reenactment of the execution of Mary Rogers in 1905, released under the title An Execution by Hanging. The occasional narrative film, usually a comedy, was typically shot in one scene, with no editing. Spurred on by competition from Edison and British and European producers, Biograph production from 1903 onward was increasingly dominated by narratives. As the stories became more complex the films became longer, with multiple scenes to tell the story, although an individual scene was still usually presented in one shot without editing. Biograph's production of actualities ended by 1908 in favor of the narrative film.

== Studio ==
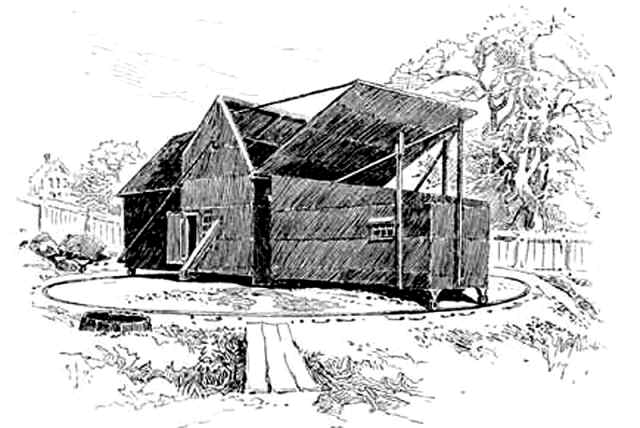
Biograph's first studio was similar to Edison's Black Maria, pictured here, only located ...

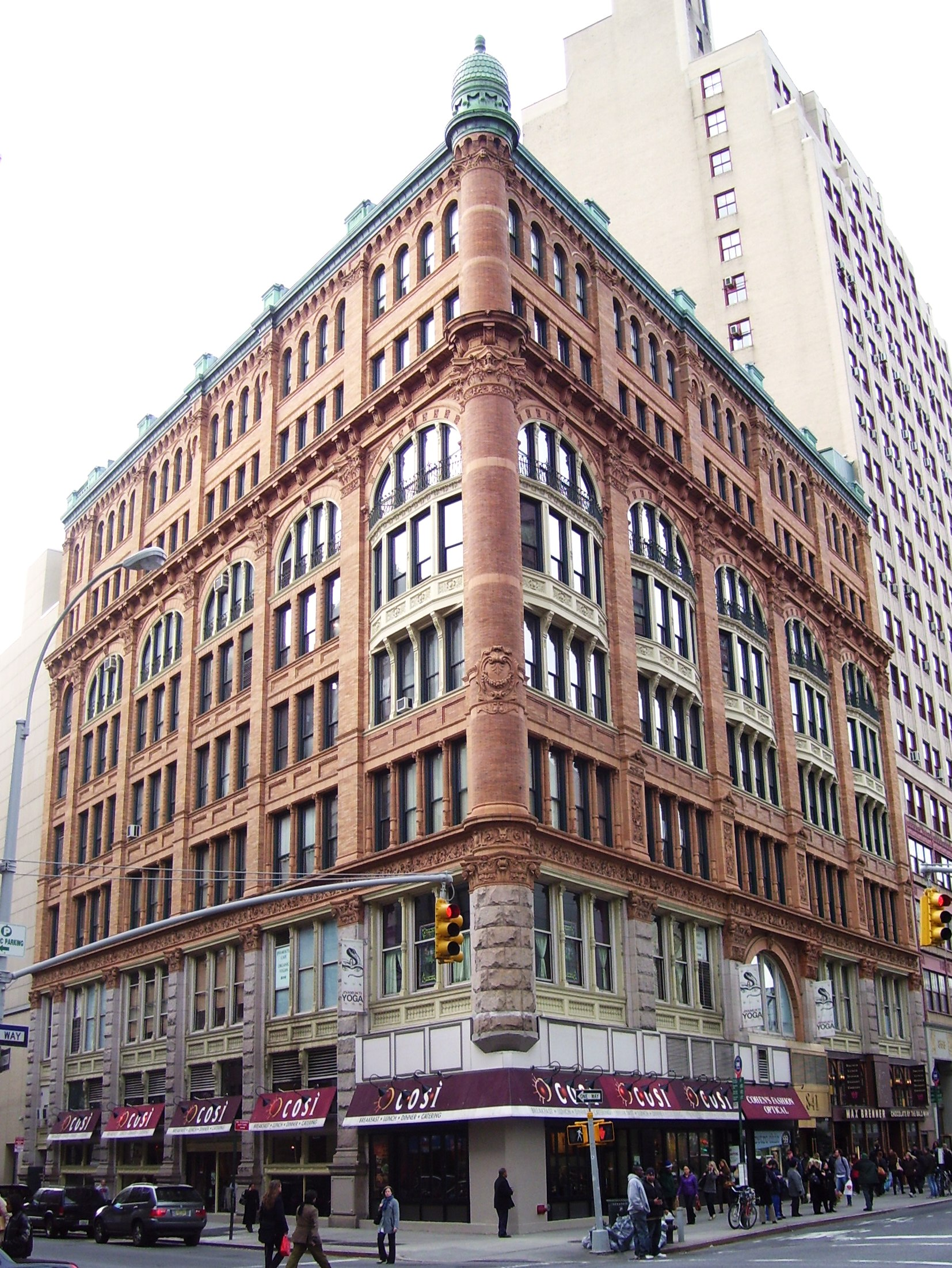
... on the roof of 841 Broadway in Manhattan

The company's first studio was located on the roof of 841 Broadway at 13th St. in Manhattan, known then as the Hackett Carhart Building and today as the Roosevelt Building. The set-up was similar to Thomas Edison's "Black Maria" in West Orange, New Jersey, with the studio itself being mounted on circular tracks to be able to get the best possible sunlight (as of 1988 the foundations of this machinery were still extant). The company moved in 1906 to a converted brownstone mansion at 11 East 14th Street near Union Square, a building that was razed in the 1960s. This was Biograph's first indoor studio, and the first movie studio in the world to rely exclusively on artificial light. Biograph moved again in 1913, as it entered feature-film production, to a new state-of-the-art studio on 175th Street in the Bronx. Among the first projects filmed there was Chocolate Dynamite, which was shot in late August 1913 and was a split-reel comedy short, not a feature-film release.

There was the problem of the underground "duping" business, where people would illegally duplicate a copyrighted movie and then remove the title screen with the company and copyright notice and sell it to theaters. In order to make the theater audience aware that they were watching an American Biograph movie (regardless of whether it was illegally "duped" or not) the AB logo would be prominently placed in random parts of the movie.

== Rise of D. W. Griffith ==
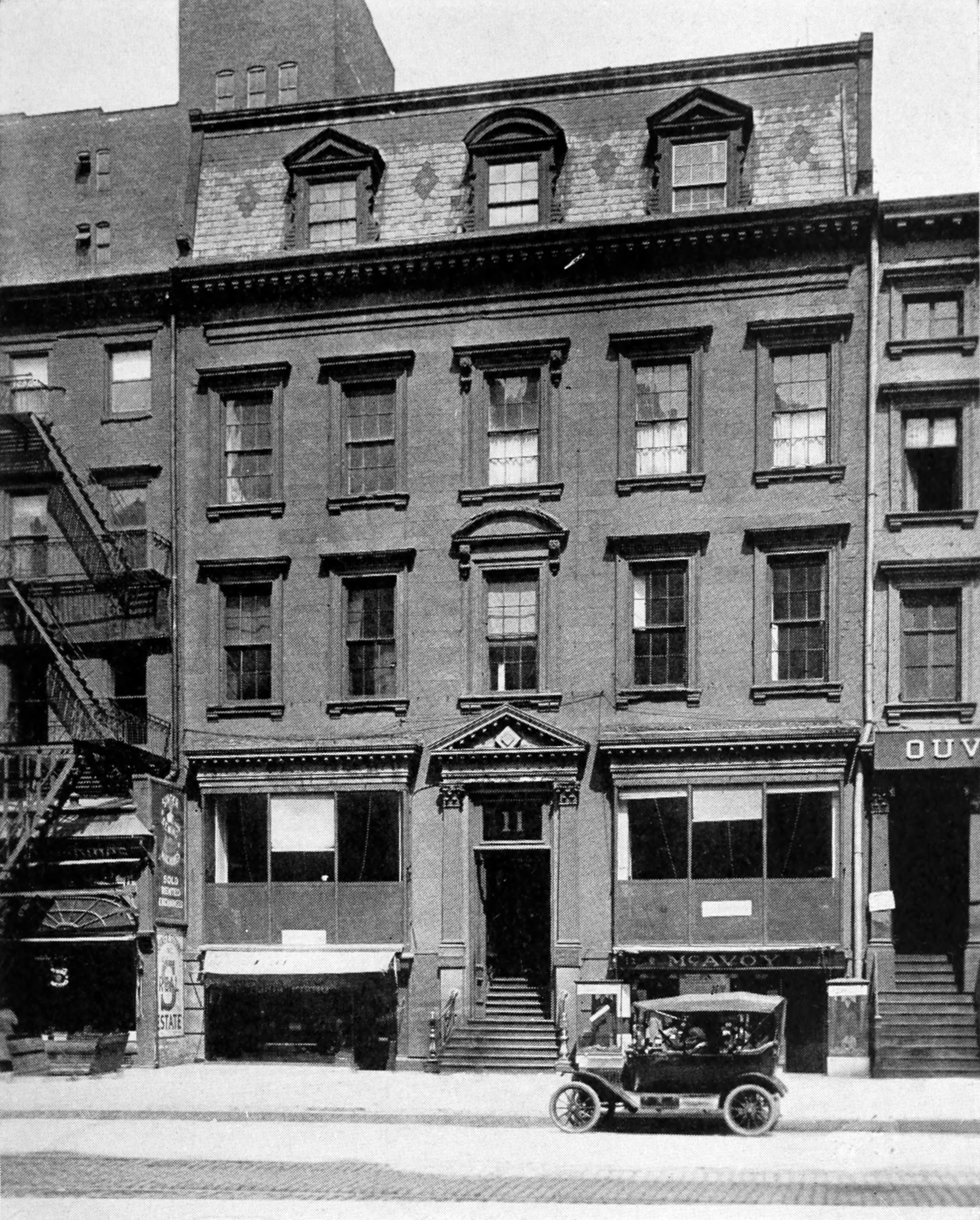
Biograph moved into this Manhattan brownstone in 1906 and continued to produce films there until 1913

Director D. W. Griffith joined Biograph in 1908 as a writer and actor, but within months became its principal director. In 1908, the company's head director Wallace McCutcheon grew ill, and his son Wallace McCutcheon Jr. took his place but was not able to make a successful film for the company. As a result of these failed productions, studio head Harry Marvin gave the position of head director to Griffith, whose first film was The Adventures of Dollie. Griffith helped establish many of the conventions of narrative film, including cross-cutting to show events occurring simultaneously in different places, the flashback, the fade-in/fade-out, the interposition of closeups within a scene, and a moderated acting style more suitable for film. Although Griffith did not invent these techniques, he made them a regular part of the film vocabulary. His prolific output—often one new film a week—and willingness to experiment in many different genres helped the company become a major commercial success. Many early movie stars were Biograph performers, including Mary Pickford, Lionel Barrymore, Lillian Gish, Dorothy Gish, Robert Harron, Arthur V. Johnson, Florence Auer, Robert G. Vignola, Owen Moore, Alan Hale Sr., Florence Lawrence, Blanche Sweet, Harry Carey, James Kirkwood Sr., Mabel Normand, Henry B. Walthall, Mae Marsh, and Dorothy Davenport. Mack Sennett honed his craft as an actor and director of comedies at Biograph. After debuting at Biograph, Mary Pickford also became a top star at the studio and would soon be known to audiences as "The Biograph Girl".

In January 1910, Griffith and Lee Dougherty with the rest of the Biograph acting company travelled to Los Angeles. While the purpose of the trip was to shoot Ramona in authentic locations, it was also to determine the suitability of the West Coast as a place for a permanent studio. The group set up a small facility at Washington Street and Grand Avenue. After this, Griffith and his players decided to go a little further north to a small village they had heard about that was friendly and had beautiful floral scenery. They decided to travel there and fell in love with this little place called Hollywood. Biograph then made the first film ever in Hollywood called In Old California, a Latino melodrama about the early days of Mexico-owned California. Griffith and the Biograph troupe filmed other short movies at various locations, then traveled back to New York. After the East Coast film community heard about Hollywood, other companies began to migrate there. Biograph's little film launched Hollywood as the future movie capital of the world. It opened a studio at Pico and Georgia streets in downtown Los Angeles (where the Los Angeles Convention Center now stands) in 1911, and sent a film crew to work there each year until 1916.

PLAY partial copy of The Wanderer (1913) directed by Griffith for Biograph; runtime time 00:06:23.

Griffith left Biograph in October 1913 after finishing Judith of Bethulia, unhappy with the company's resistance to larger budgets, feature film production or giving onscreen credit to him and the cast. With him went many of the Biograph actors, his cameraman Billy Bitzer and his production crew. As a final slight to Griffith, Biograph delayed release of Judith of Bethulia until March 1914, to avoid a profit-sharing arrangement the company had with him.

== Decline ==
In December 1908, Biograph joined Edison in forming the Motion Picture Patents Company in an attempt to control the industry and shut out smaller producers. The "Edison Trust," as it was nicknamed, was made up of Edison, Biograph, Essanay Studios, Kalem Company, George Kleine Productions, Lubin Studios, Georges Méliès, Pathé, Selig Studios and Vitagraph Studios, and dominated distribution through the General Film Co. The Motion Picture Patents Co. and the General Film Co. were found guilty of antitrust violation in October 1915 and dissolved.

Shielded by the Trust, Biograph had been slow to enter feature film production. It contracted with the theatrical firm of Klaw & Erlanger in 1913 to produce movie versions of the latter's plays. Its first released feature, Classmates, came out in February 1914, after 69 other American features had been released in 1912–13. Distribution was hampered by Biograph using a special perforation pattern on the Klaw & Erlanger features that was incompatible with standard projectors, forcing exhibitors to lease specialized equipment from Biograph in order to show the films. With the exodus of the studio's best actors to Griffith, Biograph was unable to develop a marketable star system as the independent companies were doing, and after the Trust's fall, Biograph found itself behind the times. The Biograph Co. released its last new feature-length films in 1915 and its last new short films in 1916. Biograph spent the remainder of the silent era reissuing its old films, and leasing its Bronx studio to other producers.

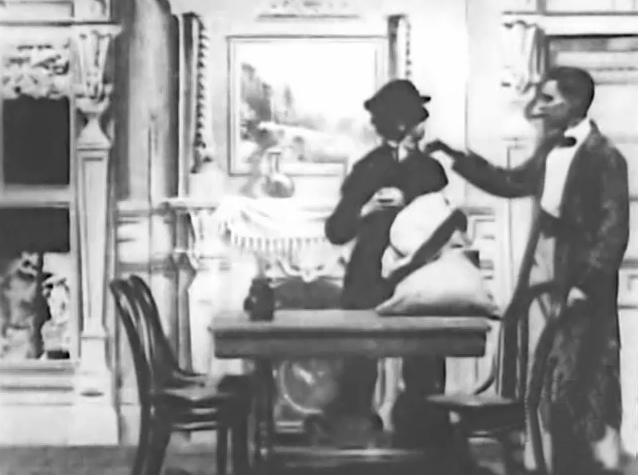
Still from Biograph's film Sherlock Holmes Baffled (1903)

When the company fell on financial hard times, the Biograph Studio facilities and film laboratory in the Bronx were acquired by one of Biograph Company's creditors, the Empire Trust Company, although some of the ex-Biograph staff were retained to manage the studio and laboratory facilities. Herbert Yates acquired the Biograph Studios facilities and film laboratory in 1928. Biograph Studios facilities and film laboratory were made a subsidiary of his Consolidated Film Industries in 1928. The studio facilities and laboratory burned down in 1980.

== Legacy ==
In 1939, Iris Barry, founder of the film department at the Museum of Modern Art, acquired 900 cans of film from the Actinograph Corp. Bronx Biograph studio and laboratory facilities, which was closing its film vault and planning to destroy all the film. One uncompleted film, Lime Kiln Field Day (1913), with an all African American cast, was found among the many cans of film, and shown at MOMA in November 2014.

From 1954 to 1957, Sterling Television Company distributed a package of 100 quarter-hour television shows titled Movie Museum, featuring Biograph, Edison and other early films from the vaults of the Museum of Modern Art and the George Eastman House. In 2024 the Film Preservation Society began a "Biograph Project" to preserve and restore all 460+ American Biograph films directed by DW Griffith between 1908 and 1913.

In 2022, the oldest footage found of the Mardi Gras Festival were found in the Eye Filmmuseum in Amsterdam. The footage was originally made by the American Mutoscope and Biograph Company, but copies of the film were notably absent in the Library of Congress and other American archives up until its discovery and restoration. Later in 2022, the film was selected for preservation in the National Film Registry by the Library of Congress.

Mardi Gras Carnival (1898)

== Filmography ==
- List of Biograph films released in 1909
- List of Biograph films released in 1910

== See also ==
- Biograph Studios
- Biograph Theater
- Cinema of the United States
- History of cinema
- List of film formats
- List of film production companies
