= Cadogan Place =

Street in Belgravia, London

Coordinates: 51°29′48″N 0°09′27″W

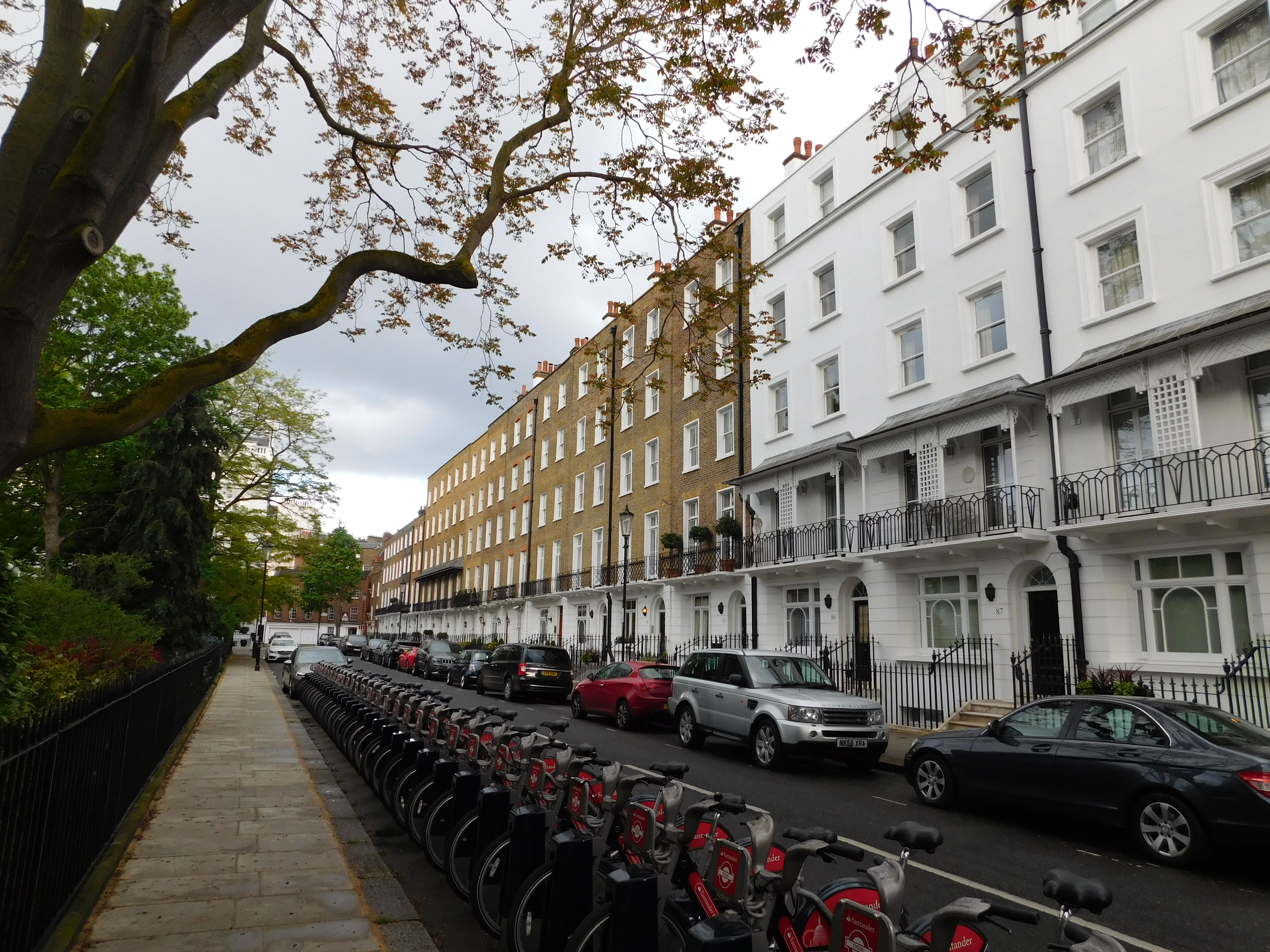
70–90 Cadogan Place in 2017

Cadogan Place is a street in Belgravia, London. It is named after Earl Cadogan and runs parallel to the lower half of Sloane Street. It gives its name to the extensive Cadogan Place Gardens, private communal gardens maintained for Cadogan residents. It is owned by Cadogan Estates.

Cadogan Place is considered part of Prime Central London, an area of high property values that are popular with foreign buyers, particularly from the Middle East and China. The average value of a property in Cadogan Place was estimated at £5 million in 2020; with flats selling for an average of £3.1 million and terraced houses for £11.1 million.

Nos. 21–27, 28–33, 34–69, and 70–90 Cadogan Place are listed Grade II on the National Heritage List for England as are the two bollards outside 70 Cadogan Place marked 'Hans Town 1819'. The 3 hectares (7.4 acres) of communal gardens, known as the North and South gardens, are also Grade II listed on the Register of Historic Parks and Gardens. The Carlton Tower Hotel is situated at the north end of Cadogan Place. It is bordered to the west by Sloane Street and bisected by Pont Street to the north which runs east to west from Cadogan Place to Sloane Street. The eastern side of Cadogan Place is defined by its long stuccoed terraces built in the early 19th century.

The 10 tonne 'Belgravia Fatberg', a fatberg made up of grease, fat, and "unflushable" wet wipes was found under Cadogan Place in October 2020. It was removed by engineers from Thames Water, who said that it weighed more than an African elephant.

The northern garden was laid out by Humphry Repton in 1806. Repton laid out winding paths and created ridges and dips from excavated soil. An underground car park was created in the 1970s underneath the northern garden. The garden features rosebeds and shrubs and a summerhouse. A bronze sculpture of two figures by David Wynne is situated in the northern garden.

== Literary references ==
Charles Dickens wrote of Cadogan Place in his 1839 novel Nicholas Nickleby that it was a "slight bond" between the "aristocratic pavements" of Belgrave Square and the "barbarism" of Chelsea and the residents had the "airs and semblances of loftiest rank" while possessing "the realities of middle station". Cadogan Place is the home of Fanny and Robert Assingham in Henry James's late novel The Golden Bowl.

== Notable residents ==
- No. 18 was the childhood home of Lord Alfred Douglas, the writer and poet, and the lover of Oscar Wilde.
- No. 44 was the residence of the abolitionist William Wilberforce for the last ten days of his life. He died here on 29 July 1833. His residence is marked by a London County Council commemorative blue plaque placed in 1961.
- No. 52 was the London birthplace, childhood and family home of Harold Macmillan (1894–1986), Prime Minister of the United Kingdom from 1957 to 1963.
- No. 79 is the former home of Lord and Lady Colin Campbell who provided Victorian London with a sensational divorce trial in 1886.
- No. 30 was the residence of Wynne Ellis, haberdasher and art collector and benefactor to the National Gallery.
- Dorothea Jordan, actress and courtesan and the mistress and companion of the future King William IV of the United Kingdom. Her residence is marked by a London County Council blue plaque placed in 1975.
- Zachary Macaulay and his wife Selina Mills from 1818 to 1823
- Lieutenant-General Herbert Taylor, first Private Secretary to the Sovereign

== See also ==
- List of eponymous roads in London
