= Israel Philatelic Federation =

Philately association in Israel

- Founded: 1945; 81 years ago
- Type: Non-profit; NGO
- Location: Tel Aviv, Israel
- Region served: Israel and the Israeli-occupied territories
- Website: israelphilately.org.il/main_e.asp

The Israel Philatelic Federation is an association whose purpose is to nurture and promote philately in Israel.

== Introduction ==
The Israel Philatelic Federation, which later became affiliated with the Fédération Internationale de Philatélie (FIP), was established in Tel Aviv, Israel on 11 April 1945. This came after the national philatelic exhibition "Fila 1945," organized by the Tel Aviv Philately Association. The federation collaborates closely with the Philatelic Service and receives support from the Israel Postal Company (formerly the Israel Postal Authority).

== History ==
The Israel Philatelic Federation established its initial location in 1959 in Jerusalem. In June 1960 a Ghana exhibition was opened. The museum continued to operate until 1963 in its original location. In the early 1960s, the Israel Museum received a donation of a stamp collection from the estate of Mr. Spillman. The stamps were intended for display at the Museum of Science and Technology. In July 1983, an agreement was signed between the Ministry of Communications and the Tel Aviv municipality to establish the Museum of Postal History within the museum, named after Jacob Agam's wife. In September 1983, a cornerstone was laid for the museum. Funding for the construction of the museum faced difficulties, and in September 1989, a ceremony was held to sign an agreement for funding the building. Even this step was not sufficient, and in 1991, the Philatelic Service issued a special souvenir sheet, with all proceeds from its sale dedicated to completing the museum's construction.

Opened on May 19, 1998, as part of the State of Israel's 50th Jubilee celebrations, the Alexander Pavilion of Postal History and Philately is a permanent exhibition in the Eretz Israel Museum in Ramat Aviv. In 2024, a Google Map was prepared to mark all global locations that appear on Israeli stamps.

== Virtual Stamp Exhibition ==
A tri-national virtual exhibition to promote collaboration between philatelists from the 3 nations, USA, UAE and Israel, that signed the Abraham Accords in August 2020

== International activities ==
On the international level, the Israel Philatelic Federation organizes philatelic exhibitions, encourages the participation of Israeli philatelists in exhibitions abroad, and represents Israel in international professional committees.
