= Paper print =

Early motion picture print format

Paper print of the motion picture Edison Kinetoscopic Record of a Sneeze, Jan. 7, 1894, commonly known as Fred Ott's Sneeze (1894) from the Library of Congress, Prints and Photographs Division. Taken and copyrighted by W. K. L. Dickson for Thomas A. Edison. Although this composite photograph is the oldest paper print of a motion picture known to survive, the vast majority of works in the Library of Congress Paper Print Film Collection are rolls of paper strips 35 mm wide.

Paper prints of films were an early mechanism to establish the copyright of motion pictures by depositing them with the Library of Congress. Thomas Alva Edison’s company was first to register each frame of motion-picture film onto a positive paper print, in 1893. The Library of Congress processed and cataloged each of the films as one photograph, accepting thousands of paper prints of films over a twenty-year period.

An unintended but fortunate side-effect is that while the actual films and negatives of this period often decayed or were destroyed, the paper prints sat ignored until the 1940s and were conserved. When this copyright deposit method ended in 1912, actual film prints were registered. Many films made before 1912 were lost forever because their original elements (for example, nitrate film) were too unstable for any lasting preservation or conservation. Paper prints, though, came with their own unpredictable nature, bringing migration challenges that rival the difficulties involved with the analog/digital conversions of today.

== Physical aspects ==
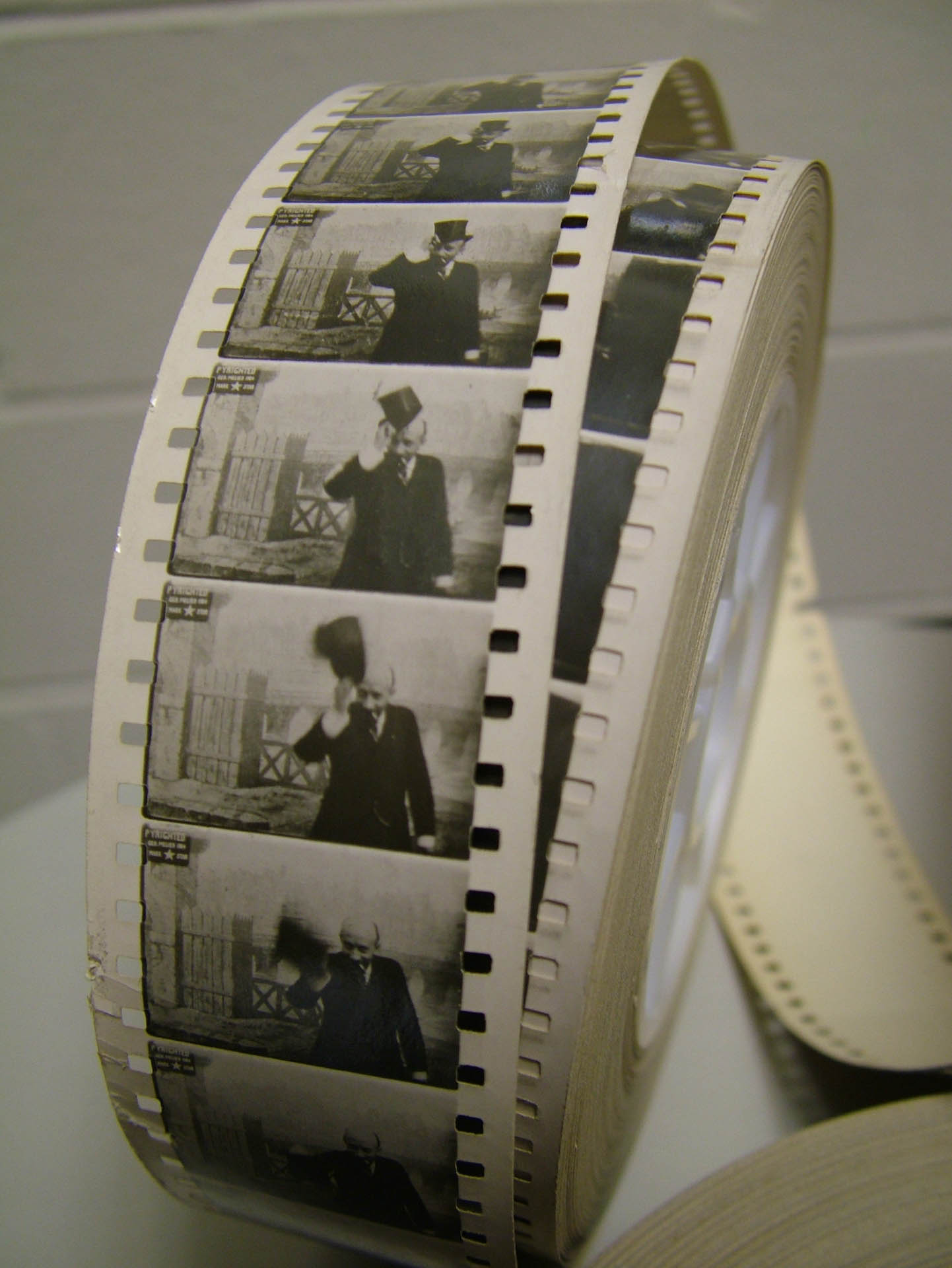
Paper print of The Untamable Whiskers (1904)

Paper prints were the positive opaque copies of their transparent film negative source. Just like film wound on a film core, the paper print was also tightly wound in the same way. Most accounts of the paper prints collection never mention the chemical composition of the photographs, but archivists at Ohio State University who received one of the restoration printers used for the conversion project refer to these photographic prints as existing on bromide photographic paper. No specifications could be found on the composition of bromide paper of the time, but one manufacturer today is Kentmere. Their bromide paper "features a conventional double weight fiber-base, coated with a neutral tone bromide emulsion…Glossy unglazed surface only. The double weight paper is approximately 276 g/m² and a thickness of approximately 260 μm." Photos of the paper on cores have a density that look very much like the films would, although there are no specifications on film of the time. Motion picture film was not standardized in the early years, and therefore, neither were its paper copies.

== First effort at reformatting ==
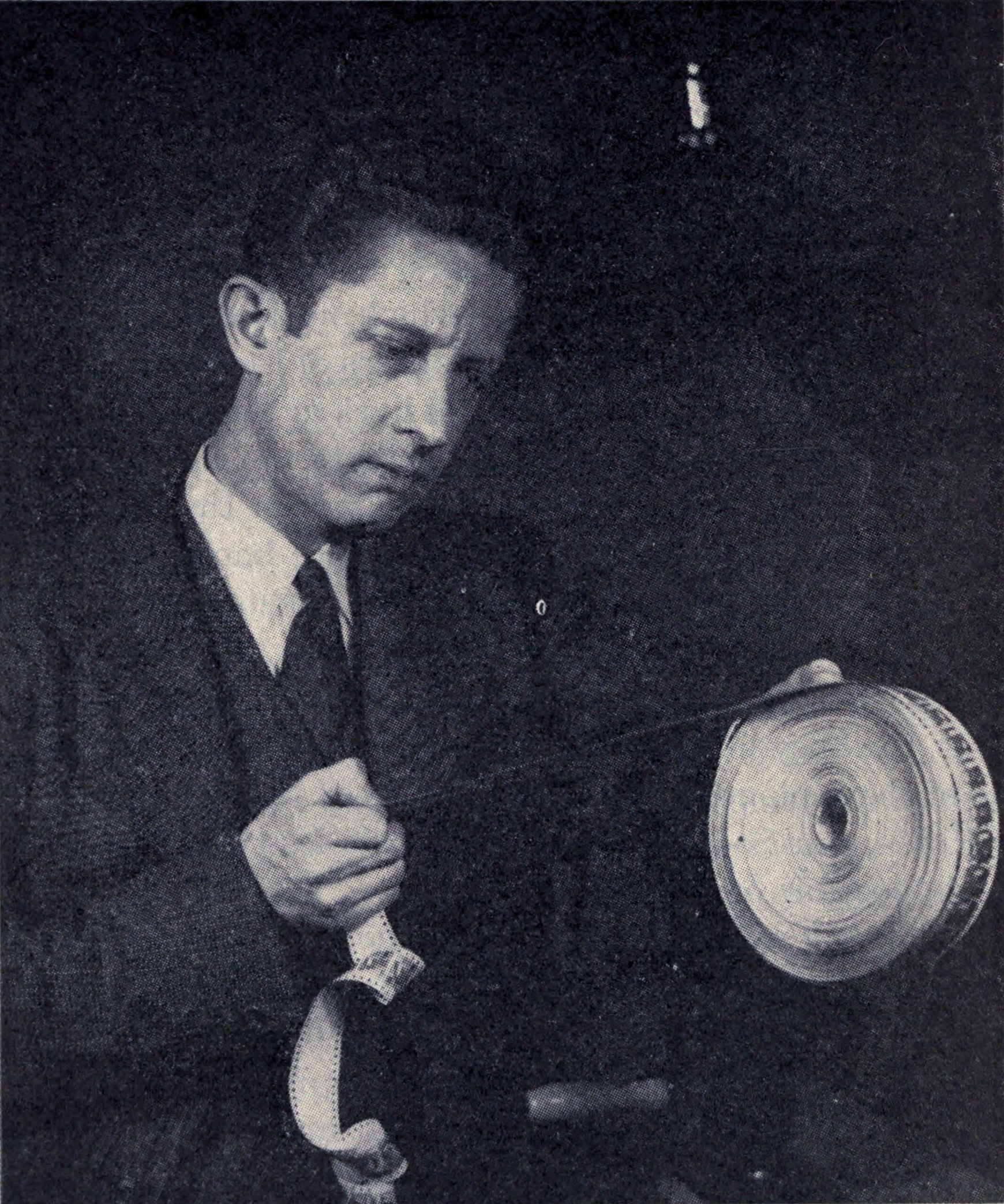
Howard Walls with a paper print from the Library of Congress (1943)

By 1902, the paper prints had accumulated to 1,413 according to the 1943 Annual Report of the Librarian of Congress. By the time of their rediscovery in 1939, over 3,000 were stored within a vault of the copyright office. Librarian Howard Walls made the discovery and described the scene this way:

That vault had been open to all kinds of weather, but the grating was over a shaft so it never rained in there, it never snowed in there. And the successive wrappings on these paper rolls protected them. Each time it was wrapped around, the picture underneath was protected.

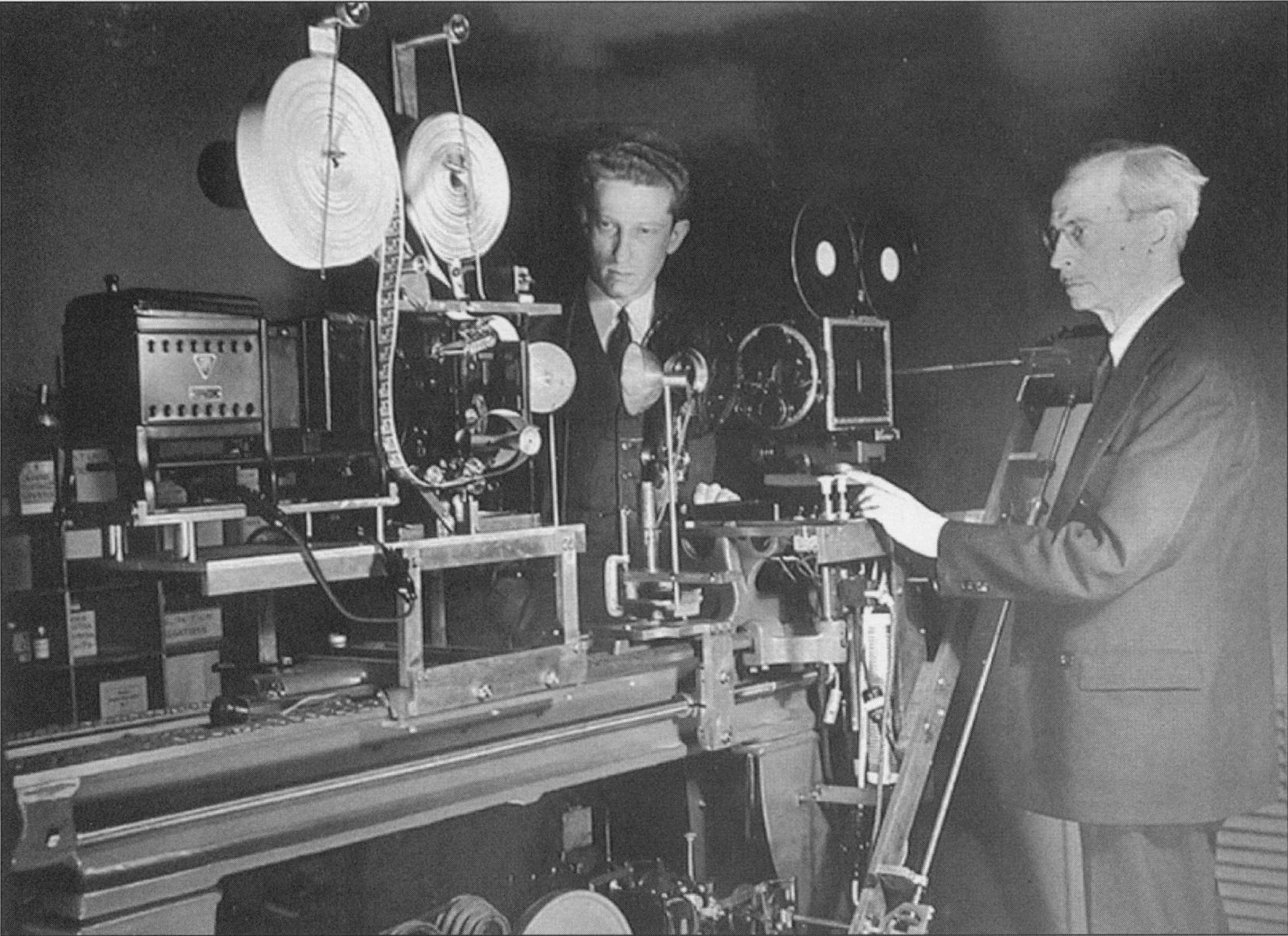
Walls and Carl Louis Gregory (right) copying a paper print roll, using an optical printer modified by Gregory (1943)

Walls recruited a National Archives motion picture engineer, pioneer cinematographer Carl Louis Gregory, to help get the movies back into shape for screening. Gregory observed the fragile state of the paper, some of which had sprocket perforations punched through. Sprocket holes or not, the paper could never travel through a projector or automated printer without being shredded. Gregory designed a system that adopted many of the traits involved with shooting animation in that era. Modifying a process optical printer, he was able to exchange sprocket heads and pull down pins that were necessary to advance the film and yet not tear it to pieces. An adjustable aperture plate was added to frame images that had been produced by a variety of cameras without any uniform standardization. The transfer of the paper prints was done at one exposure setting without any consideration for the variations in image density of the negative, so Gregory adjusted his lighting that reflected off the print to maximize the information captured to a new film negative. There is no record of the film format used to recapture the paper prints.

The war years interrupted plans to migrate more films. Later, Howard Walls would devote his time primarily to the Academy of Motion Picture Arts and Sciences and would try to initiate a program to rescue the paper prints at the Library. Nothing seemed to get beyond the fundraising stage, though, as Walls was enveloped in management intrigue and other responsibilities to the academy.

== Second effort at reformatting ==
The academy did take up Walls' cause, but only with his departure in 1953. The real work began with Kemp R. Niver. For roughly a decade, the former filmmaker migrated over two million feet of films from paper. He established the Renovare Company and process (“to restore” in Latin) and with initial funding from the academy (later funding would be private and then by congressional appropriation), Niver unwound film history. He also wrote a good amount about this program.

As mentioned, the filmmaking process had not been standardized. In fact, many manufacturers purposely avoided the exact workings of Edison's well-regarded Kinetograph, thereby avoiding infringement, while copying the essential functions with a few tweaks to the format. Niver also supposed that amateur engineers and filmmakers were designing their own cameras for a time, each one producing a different image size, with variation in sprocket hole number, size and pattern. He ranted about "some little man with a movie picture camera of his very own, constructed from a cigar box, some spare parts from a plow, and pieces of his grandmother’s sewing machine."

With adjustments, issues of frame lines and sprocket holes were resolved with each incoming print, but hand cranked film speed was also a nagging issue. Renovare would capture each frame, but a film could have been undercranked and exposed only for twelve frames per second. Playback on today's film projectors might require 18 or 24 frame/s. Everything would appear comically fast. The solution was to expose a frame or every other frame twice, thereby making the action appear realistic. The reverse was true as well, with overcranked exposures; frames would have to be removed to avoid slow motion films.

Another problem encountered by Niver and not discovered in any details of Gregory's efforts at the Library, is just what happens to photographs that have been tightly rolled up for four decades or more. Niver explained it by way of this example:

Look at the palm of your hand when it is in a relaxed position. Notice the soft wrinkles. Then open your hand—there are no wrinkles on the palm. Now you know what happens to the emulsion of a photograph that is laid out flat after having been in a curved position for half a century.

Niver reached out to a preservation expert who told him to soak the paper and dry it by heated drum. Both of these are standard last steps in photo development. Niver saw the prints gain some of their original flat disposition and found an added benefit of a soft surface glaze which made for a more definitive image for capture back to film.

Renovare worked through the variety of problems inherent in a collection without uniformity and developed the machinery that would adapt to those problems. By the end of the program, the Mark VIII, an optical printer, could capture about 16,000 frames every six hours. The resulting films were produced on 16 mm acetate safety film stock. Niver's rationale for this is three-fold: the end users would likely be students and the format was simple to use, storage space was not in abundance, and costs were kept low.

Kemp Niver was lauded at first (an Honorary Academy Award in 1954). He also publicized his efforts, which led to “a great number of requests for copies of early films.” The Mark VIII is now with the UCLA film archive while an original restoration printer went into use at Ohio State. Still he did have at least one critic at the time, a film historian who found the guide to his work "full of curious categorization and arbitrary cross-indexing, as well as a great deal of needless duplication."

== Current migration effort ==
Further criticism would come upon reflection of his work. Simply put; as standards changed, Niver's migration looked sub-standard. By 1993, a project was already underway. The Library of Congress had reported “widespread dissatisfaction with image loss in the earlier… preservation” and resolved to recopy the paper prints to 35 mm. The Library was praised for this and for not leaving anything out. The new collection of over 200 films was studied by two French film historians who visited the Library in 2003. They made comparisons to the original paper prints and discovered that these "new restorations that the Library of Congress has recently carried out..., unlike Niver’s reconstitutions, are exact copies of the original paper prints."

Now, the Library's website for the Motion Picture, Broadcasting & Recorded Sound Division proudly announces that the paper prints, their most active collection, are transferring to "vastly superior new 35 mm copies." They plan on continuing "until the entire collection has been re-photographed." The events that began over a century ago with the moving image at the Library of Congress continue to unfold.

In 2004, Kinetta built a new digital scanner specifically for the Library's Paper Print Collection. Used with digital restoration software, and a special Kinetta 35mm B&W Film Recorder, films are scanned from the paper prints at 2K resolution, digitally restored, and output to 35mm B&W film. The resulting restorations are significantly better than the photochemical versions in many aspects. Films restored using this system include two Chaplin shorts.
