= Herman Casler =

American inventor (1867–1939)

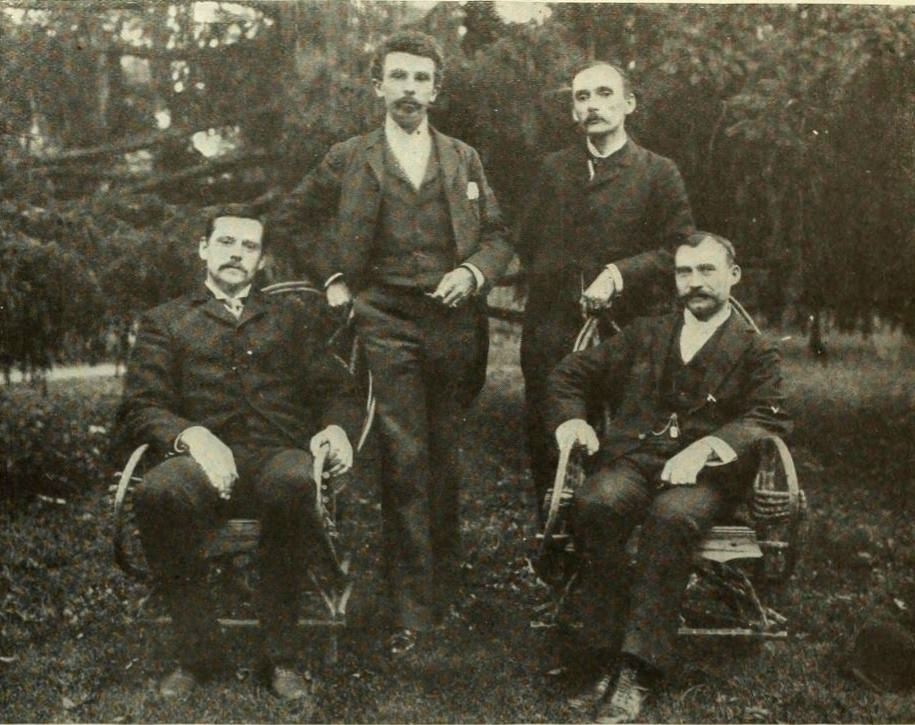
First meeting of the members of the K.M.C.D. Syndicate on September 22, 1895, from left: Henrey Norton "Harry" Marvin, William Kennedy Laurie Dickson, Herman Casler, and Elias Bernard Koopman taken at the home of Harry Marvin, Canastota, New York

Herman Casler (March 12, 1867 – July 20, 1939) was an American inventor and co-founder of the partnership called the K.M.C.D. Syndicate, along with W.K-L. Dickson, Elias Koopman, and Henry N "Harry" Marvin, which eventually was incorporated into the American Mutoscope Company in December 1895.

== Biography ==
Casler was born in Sandwich, Illinois.

Casler, Dickson, and Marvin had worked together in 1893 on a detective camera the size of a watch called the Photoret. Dickson, who at the time was working for Thomas Edison, next proposed that they work on a peephole film viewing device superior to Edison's Kinetoscope machine.

Casler, following Dickson's proposal, invented the "Mutoscope", which displayed short films through flip-cards rotated by a hand crank that could be slowed at the operator's will, unlike Edison's motorized Kinetoscope, in which films were viewed through actual 35 mm film. The prototype of the "Mutograph" camera was completed in November 1894, first tested with film in June 1895, and the first official Mutoscope films were made in August 1895. To avoid infringement on Edison's motion photo patents, the Mutograph camera used continuous movement friction rollers to move 68 mm film into the camera, instead of intermittent movement by sprockets as Edison's 35 mm camera did. Casler's patents, which he assigned to American Mutoscope in January 1896, were used as security for financing the new company.

The Mutoscope became as popular in nickelodeon parlors as the Kinetograph. However, the first public demonstration of projected motion pictures in the United States had already occurred in April 1895. Casler then designed the Biograph Projector, which was introduced on a tour of vaudeville houses in September–October 1896. The 68 mm film that Casler's camera and projector used offered four times the image area of Edison's 35 mm film, a quality improvement noted by early viewers. Both the Mutoscope and Biograph had great success. The company name was changed to American Mutoscope and Biograph Company in 1899.

Casler helped develop a portable hand-cranked camera in 1900 to replace the bulky, motor-operated camera used until then. After Biograph switched to 35 mm film production in 1902, and the number of frames per second was halved, Casler also helped John Pross to develop a three-blade projector shutter that greatly reduced flicker in the projected image. Casler was associated with Biograph until 1921 in the design and manufacture of motion picture cameras, projectors, automatic printing machines, and other special machines associated with the production of motion pictures.

Casler was raised in Fort Plain, New York, and served as an apprentice to his cousin, machinist and inventor Charles E. Lipe, founder of the C. E. Lipe Machine Shop in Syracuse, New York, from 1889 to 1893. During 1893—1895, Casler worked as a draftsman for the General Electric Co., in Schenectady, New York, designing electric rock drills. He was superintendent of the Marvin Electric Drill Co. of Canastota, New York, in 1895—1896, with Harry Marvin as his employer. Marvin and Casler formed the Marvin & Casler Co. in 1896 to manufacture the Mutoscope and other Casler inventions, notably penny arcade machines. Casler later became sole owner of Marvin & Casler, which he sold in 1919. He retired in 1926, but continued to serve as a consulting engineer to a number of corporations, and filed his last patent in 1937, two years before his death in Canastota, New York.

== Sources ==
- "Herman Casler," The National Cyclopædia of American Biography (1950), vol. 30, p. 347.
- Charles Musser (1990). The Emergence of Cinema: The American Screen to 1907. New York: Scribner. ISBN 0-684-18413-3
- "Harry Marvin" bio at IMDb
