= Mutoscope =

Hand-cranked motion-picture viewer (1895–1949)

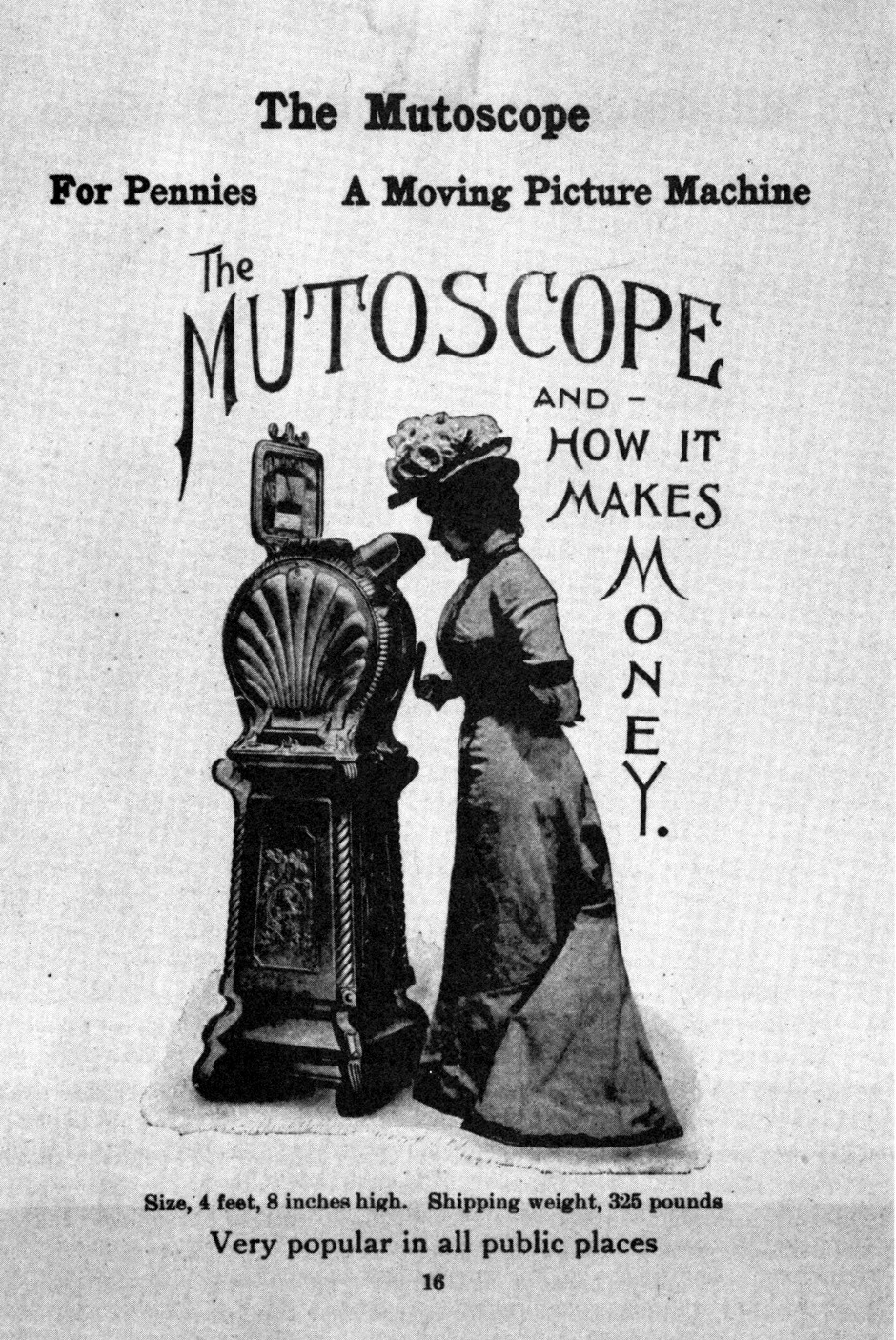
An 1899 trade advertisement

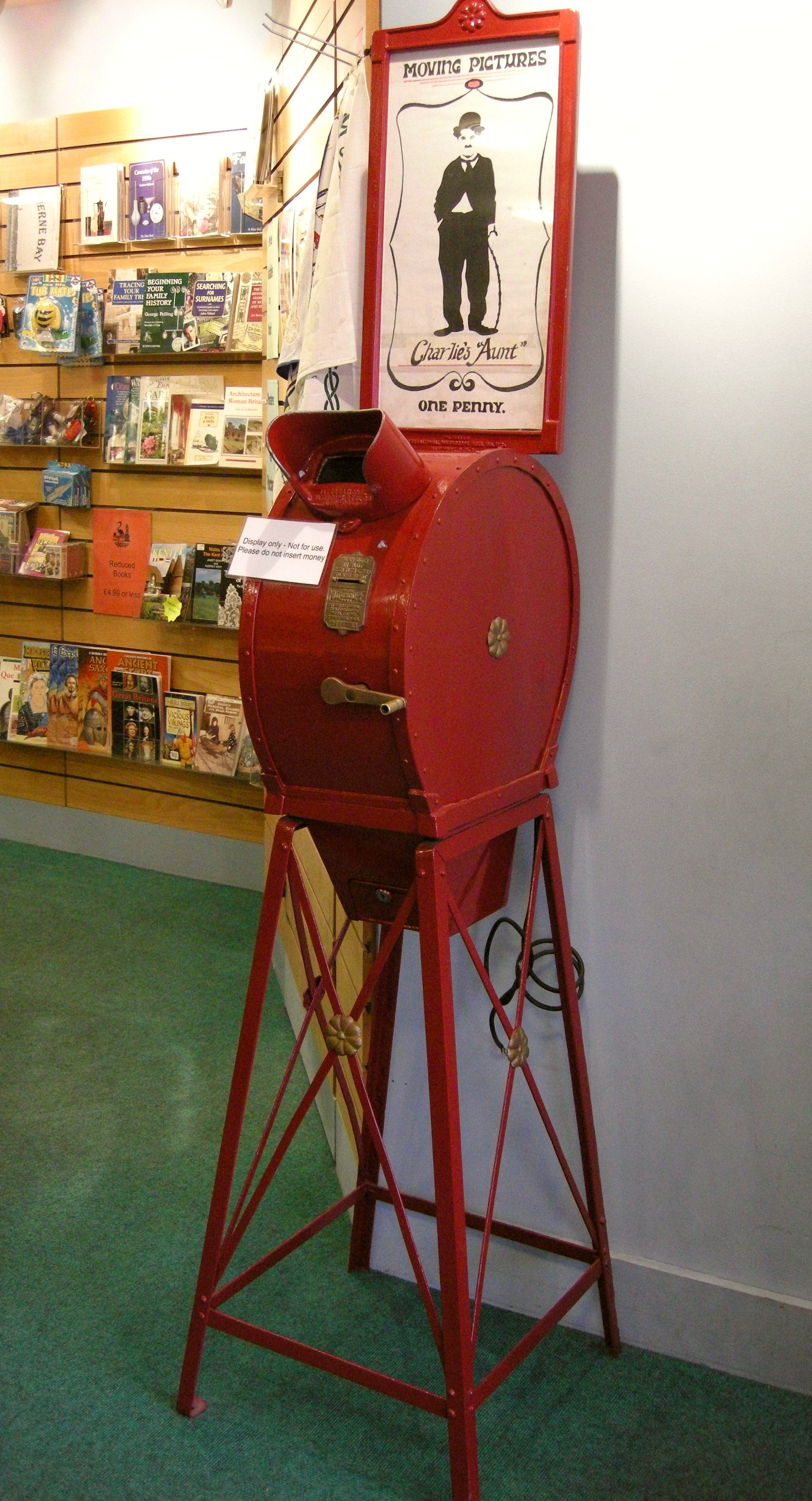
Mutoscope at Herne Bay Museum

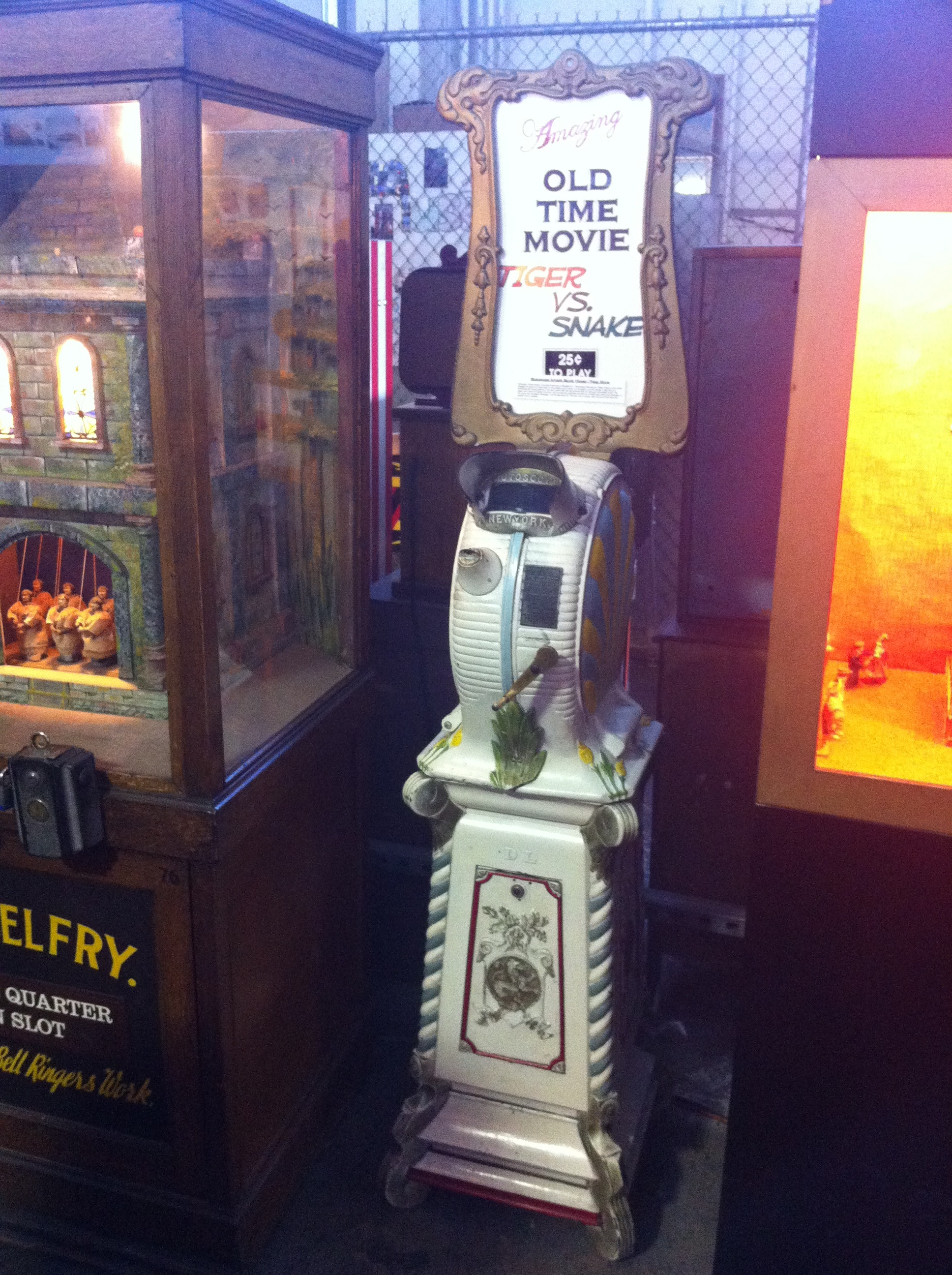
Mutoscope in San Francisco antique arcade

Mutoscope: "Mechanical Maniacs" video.

The Mutoscope is an early motion picture device, invented by W. K. L. Dickson and Herman Casler and granted U.S. patent 549309A to Herman Casler on November 5, 1895. Like Thomas Edison's Kinetoscope, it does not project on a screen and provides viewing to only one person at a time. Cheaper and simpler than the Kinetoscope, the system, marketed by the American Mutoscope Company (later the American Mutoscope and Biograph Company), quickly dominated the coin-in-the-slot peep show business.

== Operation ==
The Mutoscope works on the same principle as the flip book. The individual image frames are conventional black-and-white, silver-based photographic prints on tough, flexible opaque cards. The image on each card is made by contact printing each frame of the original 70 mm film. Rather than being bound into a booklet, the cards are attached to a circular core, similar to a huge Rolodex. A reel typically holds about 850 cards, giving a viewing time of about one minute. The reel with cards attached has a total diameter of about 10 inches (25 cm); the individual cards have dimensions of about 2 3/4 in × 1 7/8 in (7.0 cm × 4.8 cm).

Mutoscopes are coin-operated. The patron views the cards through a single lens enclosed by a hood, similar to the viewing hood of a stereoscope. The cards are generally lit electrically, but the reel is driven by means of a geared-down hand crank. Each machine holds only a single reel and is dedicated to the presentation of a single short subject, described by a poster affixed to the machine.

The patron can control the presentation speed only to a limited degree. The crank can be turned in both directions, but this does not reverse the playing of the reel. The patron cannot extend viewing time by stopping the crank, because the flexible images are bent into the proper viewing position by tension applied from forward cranking. Stopping the crank reduces the forward tension on the reels causing the reel to go backward and the picture to move away from the viewing position. A spring in the mechanism turns off the light, and in some models closes a shutter which blocks the picture.

== Manufacture ==
Mutoscopes were originally manufactured from 1895 to 1909 for the American Mutoscope Company, later American Mutoscope and Biograph Company (1899) by the Marvin & Casler Co., Canastota, New York formed by two of the founding Managers of American Mutoscope Company.

In the 1920s the Mutoscope was licensed to William Rabkin who started his own company, the International Mutoscope Reel Company, which manufactured new reels and also machines from 1926 until 1949.

The term "Mutoscope" is no longer a registered trademark in the United States.

== Usage ==
Mutoscopes were a popular feature of amusement arcades and pleasure piers in the UK until the introduction of decimal coinage in 1971. The coin mechanisms were difficult to convert, and many machines were subsequently destroyed. Some were exported to Denmark where pornography had recently been legalised. The typical arcade installation included multiple machines offering a mixture of fare. Both in the early days and during the revival, that mixture usually included "girlie" reels which ran the gamut from risqué to outright soft-core pornography. It was common for these reels to have suggestive titles that implied more than the reel actually delivered. The title of one such reel, What the Butler Saw, became a by-word, and Mutoscopes are commonly known in the UK as "What-the-Butler-Saw machines". (What the butler saw, presumably through a keyhole, was a woman partially disrobing.)

== Public response ==
The San Francisco Call printed a short piece about the Mutoscope in 1898, which claimed that the device was extremely popular: "Twenty machines, all different and amusing views...are crowded day and night with sightseers." However, just a few months later, the same newspaper published an editorial railing against the Mutoscope and similar machines: "...a new instrument has been placed in the hands of the vicious for the corruption of youth...These vicious exhibitions are displayed in San Francisco with an effrontery that is as audacious as it is shameless."

In 1899, The Times also printed a letter inveighing against "vicious demoralising picture shows in the penny-in-the-slot machines. It is hardly possible to exaggerate the corruption of the young that comes from exhibiting under a strong light, nude female figures represented as living and moving, going into and out of baths, sitting as artists' models etc. Similar exhibitions took place at Rhyl in the men's lavatory, but, owing to public denunciation, they have been stopped."
