= Lord of Kintyre =

Scottish title peerage

The Lord of Kintyre is a title in the Peerage of Scotland created in 1626.

== Early lords of Kintyre ==
- Somhairle mac Giolla Brighde (died 1164)
- Raghnall mac Somhairle (died 1191/1192–c.1210/1227)
- Ruaidhrí mac Raghnaill (died 1247?)
- Maol Coluim (died 1307?)

== Lord of Kintyre ==
- Archibald Campbell, 7th Earl of Argyll, 1st Lord of Kintyre (1626–1638).
- Archibald Campbell, 1st Marquess of Argyll, 2nd Lord of Kintyre (1645–1661).
- Archibald Campbell, 9th Earl of Argyll, 3rd Lord of Kintyre (1663–1685).
- Archibald Campbell, 1st Duke of Argyll, 4th Lord of Kintyre (1689–1703).
- John Campbell, 2nd Duke of Argyll, 5th Lord of Kintyre (1703–1743).
- Archibald Campbell, 3rd Duke of Argyll, 6th Lord of Kintyre (1743–1761).
- John Campbell, 4th Duke of Argyll, 7th Lord of Kintyre (1761–1770).
- John Campbell, 5th Duke of Argyll, 8th Lord of Kintyre (1770–1806).
- George Campbell, 6th Duke of Argyll, 9th Lord of Kintyre (1806–1839).
- John Campbell, 7th Duke of Argyll, 10th Lord of Kintyre (1839–1847).
- George Campbell, 8th Duke of Argyll, 11th Lord of Kintyre (1847–1900).
- John Campbell, 9th Duke of Argyll, 12th Lord of Kintyre (1900–1914).
- Niall Campbell, 10th Duke of Argyll, 13th Lord of Kintyre (1914–1949).
- Ian Campbell, 11th Duke of Argyll, 14th Lord of Kintyre (1949–1973).
- Ian Campbell, 12th Duke of Argyll, 15th Lord of Kintyre (1973–2001).
- Torquhil Campbell, 13th Duke of Argyll, 16th Lord of Kintyre (2001–present).

== Family tree ==
Family tree: Dukes of Argyll with subsidiary titles

Lord Campbell, 1445
Duncan Campbell (d. 1453); 1st Lord Campbell
Archibald Campbell (d. c. 1431–1440); Master of Campbell
Earl of Argyll, 1457
Colin Campbell (c. 1433–1493); 1st Earl of Argyll and 2nd Lord Campbell
Archibald Campbell (d. 1513); 2nd Earl of Argyll and 3rd Lord Campbell
Colin Campbell (c. 1486–1529); 3rd Earl of Argyll and 4th Lord Campbell
Archibald Campbell (c. 1507–1558); 4th Earl of Argyll and 5th Lord Campbell
Archibald Campbell (c. 1532–1576); 5th Earl of Argyll and 6th Lord Campbell | Colin Campbell (c. 1542–1584); 6th Earl of Argyll and 7th Lord Campbell
Archibald Campbell (1575–1638); 7th Earl of Argyll and 8th Lord Campbell
Marquess of Argyll, 1641 | Lord of Kintyre, 1627; Earl of Irvine and Lord Lundie, 1642
Archibald Campbell (1607–1661); 1st Marquess of Argyll, 8th Earl of Argyll and 9th Lord Campbell | James Campbell (1610–1645); Earl of Irvine, Lord of Kintyre, and Lord Lundie
Earldom and Marquessate of Argyll forfeit, 1661 | Earldom of Irvine extinct, 1645
Earl of Argyll (restored), 1663
Archibald Campbell (1629–1685); 9th Earl of Argyll and 10th Lord Campbell
Earldom of Argyll forfeit, 1681
Earl of Argyll (restored), 1685; Duke of Argyll, Marquess of Kintyre and Lorne, Earl of Campbell and Cowall, and Viscount Lochow and Glenyla, Lord Inveraray, Mull, Morvern, and Tiree, 1701
Archibald Campbell (1658–1703); 1st Duke of Argyll, Marquess of Kintyre and Lorne, Earl of Campbell and Cowall, Viscount of Lochow and Glenyla, and Lord Inveraray, Mull, Morvern, and Tiree, 10th Earl of Argyll and 11th Lord Campbell | John Campbell (d. 1729)
Earl of Greenwich and Baron Chatham, 1705; Duke of Greenwich, 1719 | Earl of Ilay, 1706
John Campbell (1680–1743); 2nd Duke of Argyll, Marquess of Kintyre and Lorne, Earl of Campbell and Cowall, Viscount of Lochow and Glenyla, and Lord Inveraray, Mull, Morvern, and Tiree, 11th Earl of Argyll and 12th Lord Campbell, Earl of Greenwich and Baron Chatham | Archibald Campbell (1682–1761); 3rd Duke of Argyll, Marquess of Kintyre and Lorne, Earl of Campbell and Cowall, Viscount of Lochow and Glenyla, and Lord Inveraray, Mull, Morvern, and Tiree, 12th Earl of Argyll and 13th Lord Campbell, Earl of Ilay | John Campbell (c. 1693–1770); 4th Duke of Argyll, Marquess of Kintyre and Lorne, Earl of Campbell and Cowall, Viscount of Lochow and Glenyla, and Lord Inveraray, Mull, Morvern, and Tiree, 13th Earl of Argyll and 14th Lord Campbell
Dukedom and Earldom of Greenwich and Barony Chatham extinct, 1743 | Earldom of Islay extinct, 1761
Baron Hamilton of Hameldon, 1776 | Baron Sundridge, 1766
Elizabeth Gunning (1733–1790); 1st Baroness Hamilton of Hameldon | John Campbell (1723–1806); 5th Duke of Argyll, Marquess of Kintyre and Lorne, Earl of Campbell and Cowall, Viscount of Lochow and Glenyla, and Lord Inveraray, Mull, Morvern, and Tiree, 14th Earl of Argyll and 15th Lord Campbell, 1st Baron Sundridge
Douglas Hamilton (1756–1799); 8th Duke of Hamilton, 5th Duke of Brandon, 2nd Baron Hamilton of Hameldon | George William Campbell (1766–1839); 6th Duke of Argyll, Marquess of Kintyre and Lorne, Earl of Campbell and Cowall, Viscount of Lochow and Glenyla, and Lord Inveraray, Mull, Morvern, and Tiree, 15th Earl of Argyll and 16th Lord Campbell, 2nd Baron Sundridge, 3rd Baron Hamilton of Hameldon (Note: Succeeded his half-brother from his mother's first marriage to the 6th Duke of Hamilton as Baron Hamilton.) | John Douglas Edward Henry Campbell (1777–1847); 7th Duke of Argyll, Marquess of Kintyre and Lorne, Earl of Campbell and Cowall, Viscount of Lochow and Glenyla, and Lord Inveraray, Mull, Morvern, and Tiree, 16th Earl of Argyll and 17th Lord Campbell, 3rd Baron Sundridge, 4th Baron Hamilton of Hameldon
Duke of Argyll (UK), 1892
Queen Victoria (1819–1901) | John Henry Campbell (1821–1837) | George Douglas Campbell (1823–1900); 8th Duke of Argyll (Scotland), Marquess of Kintyre and Lorne, Earl of Campbell and Cowall, Viscount of Lochow and Glenyla, and Lord Inveraray, Mull, Morvern, and Tiree, 1st Duke of Argyll (UK), 17th Earl of Argyll and 18th Lord Campbell, 4th Baron Sundridge, 5th Baron Hamilton of Hameldon, 11th Lord of Kintyre, 17th Lord Lorne
Princess Louise (1849–1939) | John George Edward Henry Douglas Sutherland Campbell (1845–1914); 9th Duke of Argyll (Scotland), Marquess of Kintyre and Lorne, Earl of Campbell and Cowall, Viscount of Lochow and Glenyla, and Lord Inveraray, Mull, Morvern, and Tiree, 2nd Duke of Argyll (UK), 18th Earl of Argyll and 19th Lord Campbell, 5th Baron Sundridge, 6th Baron Hamilton of Hameldon, 12th Lord of Kintyre, 18th Lord Lorne | Lord Archibald Campbell (1846–1913) | Lord Walter Campbell (1848–1889)
Niall Diarmid Campbell (1872–1948); 10th Duke of Argyll (Scotland), Marquess of Kintyre and Lorne, Earl of Campbell and Cowall, Viscount of Lochow and Glenyla, and Lord Inveraray, Mull, Morvern, and Tiree, 3rd Duke of Argyll (UK), 19th Earl of Argyll and 20th Lord Campbell, 6th Baron Sundridge, 7th Baron Hamilton of Hameldon, 13th Lord of Kintyre, 19th Lord Lorne | Douglas Walter Campbell (1877–1926)
Ian Douglas Campbell (1903–1973); 11th Duke of Argyll (Scotland), Marquess of Kintyre and Lorne, Earl of Campbell and Cowall, Viscount of Lochow and Glenyla, and Lord Inveraray, Mull, Morvern, and Tiree, 4th Duke of Argyll (UK), 20th Earl of Argyll and 21st Lord Campbell, 7th Baron Sundridge, 8th Baron Hamilton of Hameldon, 14th Lord of Kintyre, 20th Lord Lorne
Ian Campbell (1937–2001); 12th Duke of Argyll (Scotland), Marquess of Kintyre and Lorne, Earl of Campbell and Cowall, Viscount of Lochow and Glenyla, and Lord Inveraray, Mull, Morvern, and Tiree, 5th Duke of Argyll (UK), 21st Earl of Argyll and 22nd Lord Campbell, 8th Baron Sundridge, 9th Baron Hamilton of Hameldon, 15th Lord of Kintyre, 21st Lord Lorne
Torquhil Ian Campbell (b. 1968); 13th Duke of Argyll (Scotland), Marquess of Kintyre and Lorne, Earl of Campbell and Cowall, Viscount of Lochow and Glenyla, and Lord Inveraray, Mull, Morvern, and Tiree, 6th Duke of Argyll (UK), 22nd Earl of Argyll and 23rd Lord Campbell, 9th Baron Sundridge, 10th Baron Hamilton of Hameldon, 16th Lord of Kintyre, 22nd Lord Lorne
Archie Frederick Campbell (b. 2004) styled Marquess of Lorne
