= Baron Hamilton of Hameldon =

Barony in the Peerage of Great Britain

Barony of Hamilton of Hameldon
- Arms of Gunning, Baroness Hamilton: Gules, on a fess ermine between three doves argent ducally crowned or as many crosses pattée of the first
- Creation date: 20 May 1776
- Created by: George III
- Peerage: Peerage of Great Britain
- First holder: Elizabeth Hamilton, 1st Baroness Hamilton of Hameldon
- Present holder: Torquhil Campbell, 13th Duke of Argyll
- Heir apparent: Archibald Campbell, Marquess of Lorne
- Remainder to: The baroness' heirs male of the body lawfully begotten

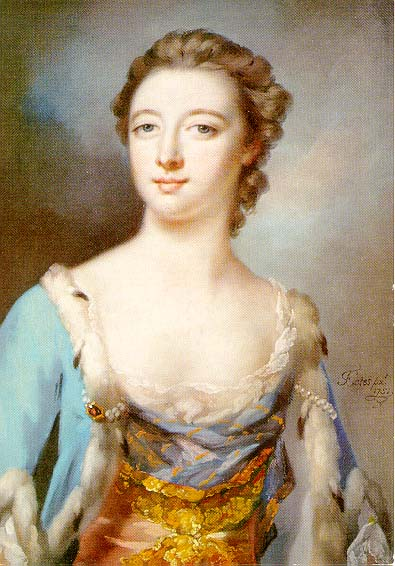
Elizabeth Hamilton, 1st Baroness Hamilton of Hameldon

Baron Hamilton of Hameldon, of Hambledon in the County of Leicester, is a title in the Peerage of Great Britain, held by the Duke of Hamilton from 1790 to 1799 and by the Duke of Argyll since 1799.

It was created in 1776 for Elizabeth Gunning (Duchess of Hamilton), wife since 1752 of James Douglas-Hamilton, 6th Duke of Hamilton. The Duke of Hamilton died in 1758, and his widow remarried the following year, to John Campbell, who later became Marquess of Lorne in 1761 and 5th Duke of Argyll in 1770. She died in 1790, and her Barony passed to her only surviving son from her first marriage, the 8th Duke of Hamilton. On his death without male issue, the barony passed to his half-brother the Marquess of Lorne, the Duchess's eldest surviving son by her second marriage. Lord Lorne succeeded his father as 6th Duke of Argyll in 1806, and the Barony of Hamilton has since remained united with that title.

The arms of Elizabeth Gunning, Baroness Hamilton of Hameldon, were her paternal arms of Gunning augmented with a fess ermine and ducal crowns for the doves: Gules, on a fess ermine between three doves argent ducally crowned or as many crosses pattée of the first.

Coat of arms of Arms of Gunning, borne by Elizabeth Gunning (Duchess of Hamilton), suo jure Baroness Hamilton of Hameldon
Adopted 1776 Coronet Coronet of a Baroness Escutcheon Gules, on a fess ermine between three doves argent ducally crowned or as many crosses pattée of the first Supporters Supporters: on the dexter side, a sphynx, guardant, and winged, Or, the face, proper, charged on the hip and shoulder with 2 crosses pattée, gules: on the sinister, a man armed with Mail, a sword by his side, proper; his exterior hand sustaining a Standard, the Staff, Or, the Banners Gules, fringed Or, and charged with Doves, as in the Arms Previous versions

== Barons Hamilton of Hameldon (1776) ==
- Elizabeth Campbell, 1st Baroness Hamilton of Hameldon (1733–1790)
- Douglas Douglas-Hamilton, 8th Duke of Hamilton, 2nd Baron Hamilton of Hameldon (1756–1799)
- George William Campbell, 6th Duke of Argyll, 3rd Baron Hamilton of Hameldon (1768–1839)

see Duke of Argyll for further succession.

== Family tree ==
Family tree: Dukes of Argyll with subsidiary titles

Lord Campbell, 1445
Duncan Campbell d. 1453; 1st Lord Campbell
Archibald Campbell d. c. 1431–1440; Master of Campbell
Earl of Argyll, 1457
Colin Campbell c. 1433–1493; 1st Earl of Argyll, 2nd Lord Campbell
Archibald Campbell d. 1513; 2nd Earl of Argyll, 3rd Lord Campbell
Colin Campbell c. 1486–1529; 3rd Earl of Argyll, 4th Lord Campbell
Archibald Campbell c. 1507–1558; 4th Earl of Argyll, 5th Lord Campbell
Archibald Campbell c. 1532–1576; 5th Earl of Argyll, 6th Lord Campbell	Colin Campbell c. 1542–1584; 6th Earl of Argyll, 7th Lord Campbell
Archibald Campbell; 1575–1638; 7th Earl of Argyll, 8th Lord Campbell
Marquess of Argyll, 1641	Lord of Kintyre, 1627; Earl of Irvine and Lord Lundie, 1642
Archibald Campbell; 1607–1661; 1st Marquess of Argyll, 8th Earl of Argyll, 9th Lord Campbell	James Campbell; 1610–1645; Earl of Irvine, etc.
Earldom and Marquessate of Argyll forfeit, 1661	Earldom of Irvine extinct, 1645
Earl of Argyll (restored), 1663
Archibald Campbell; 1629–1685; 9th Earl of Argyll, 10th Lord Campbell
Earldom of Argyll forfeit, 1681
Earl of Argyll (restored), 1685; Duke of Argyll (Scotland), Marquess of Kintyre and Lorne, Earl of Campbell and Cowall, Viscount Lochow and Glenyla, Lord Inveraray, Mull, Morvern, and Tiree, 1701
Archibald Campbell; 1658–1703; 1st Duke of Argyll, etc., 10th Earl of Argyll, 11th Lord Campbell	John Campbell d. 1729
Earl of Greenwich and Baron Chatham, 1705; Duke of Greenwich, 1719	Earl of Ilay, 1706
John Campbell; 1680–1743; 2nd Duke of Argyll, etc., Duke of Greenwich, etc., 11th Earl of Argyll, 12th Lord Campbell	Archibald Campbell; 1682–1761; 3rd Duke of Argyll, etc., 12th Earl of Argyll, 13th Lord Campbell, Earl of Ilay	John Campbell c. 1693–1770; 4th Duke of Argyll, etc., 13th Earl of Argyll, 14th Lord Campbell
Dukedom and Earldom of Greenwich and Barony Chatham extinct, 1743	Earldom of Islay extinct, 1761
Baron Hamilton of Hameldon, 1776	Baron Sundridge, 1766
Elizabeth Gunning; 1733–1790; 1st Baroness Hamilton of Hameldon	John Campbell; 1723–1806; 5th Duke of Argyll, etc., 14th Earl of Argyll, 15th Lord Campbell, 1st Baron Sundridge
Douglas Hamilton; 1756–1799; 8th Duke of Hamilton, 5th Duke of Brandon, 2nd Baron Hamilton of Hameldon	George William Campbell; 1766–1839; 6th Duke of Argyll, etc., 15th Earl of Argyll, 16th Lord Campbell, 2nd Baron Sundridge, 3rd Baron Hamilton of Hameldon (Note: Succeeded his half-brother from his mother's first marriage to the 6th Duke of Hamilton as Baron Hamilton.)	John Douglas Edward Henry Campbell; 1777–1847; 7th Duke of Argyll, etc., 16th Earl of Argyll, 17th Lord Campbell, 3rd Baron Sundridge, 4th Baron Hamilton of Hameldon
Duke of Argyll (UK), 1892
Queen Victoria; 1819–1901	John Henry Campbell; 1821–1837	George Douglas Campbell; 1823–1900; 8th Duke of Argyll (Scotland), etc., 1st Duke of Argyll (UK), 17th Earl of Argyll, 18th Lord Campbell, 4th Baron Sundridge, 5th Baron Hamilton of Hameldon, 11th Lord of Kintyre, 17th Lord Lorne
Princess Louise; 1849–1939	John George Edward Henry Douglas Sutherland Campbell; 1845–1914; 9th Duke of Argyll (Scotland), etc., 2nd Duke of Argyll (UK), 18th Earl of Argyll, 19th Lord Campbell, 5th Baron Sundridge, 6th Baron Hamilton of Hameldon, 12th Lord of Kintyre, 18th Lord Lorne	Lord Archibald Campbell; 1846–1913	Lord Walter Campbell; 1848–1889
Niall Diarmid Campbell; 1872–1948; 10th Duke of Argyll (Scotland), etc., 3rd Duke of Argyll (UK), 19th Earl of Argyll, 20th Lord Campbell, 6th Baron Sundridge, 7th Baron Hamilton of Hameldon, 13th Lord of Kintyre, 19th Lord Lorne	Douglas Walter Campbell; 1877–1926
Ian Douglas Campbell; 1903–1973; 11th Duke of Argyll (Scotland), etc., 4th Duke of Argyll (UK), 20th Earl of Argyll, 21st Lord Campbell, 7th Baron Sundridge, 8th Baron Hamilton of Hameldon, 14th Lord of Kintyre, 20th Lord Lorne
Ian Campbell; 1937–2001; 12th Duke of Argyll (Scotland), etc., 5th Duke of Argyll (UK), 21st Earl of Argyll, 22nd Lord Campbell, 8th Baron Sundridge, 9th Baron Hamilton of Hameldon, 15th Lord of Kintyre, 21st Lord Lorne
Torquhil Ian Campbell b. 1968; 13th Duke of Argyll (Scotland), etc., 6th Duke of Argyll (UK), 22nd Earl of Argyll, 23rd Lord Campbell, 9th Baron Sundridge, 10th Baron Hamilton of Hameldon, 16th Lord of Kintyre, 22nd Lord Lorne
Archie Frederick Campbell b. 2004 styled Marquess of Lorne
