= Jane Erskine =

19th-century British noblewoman

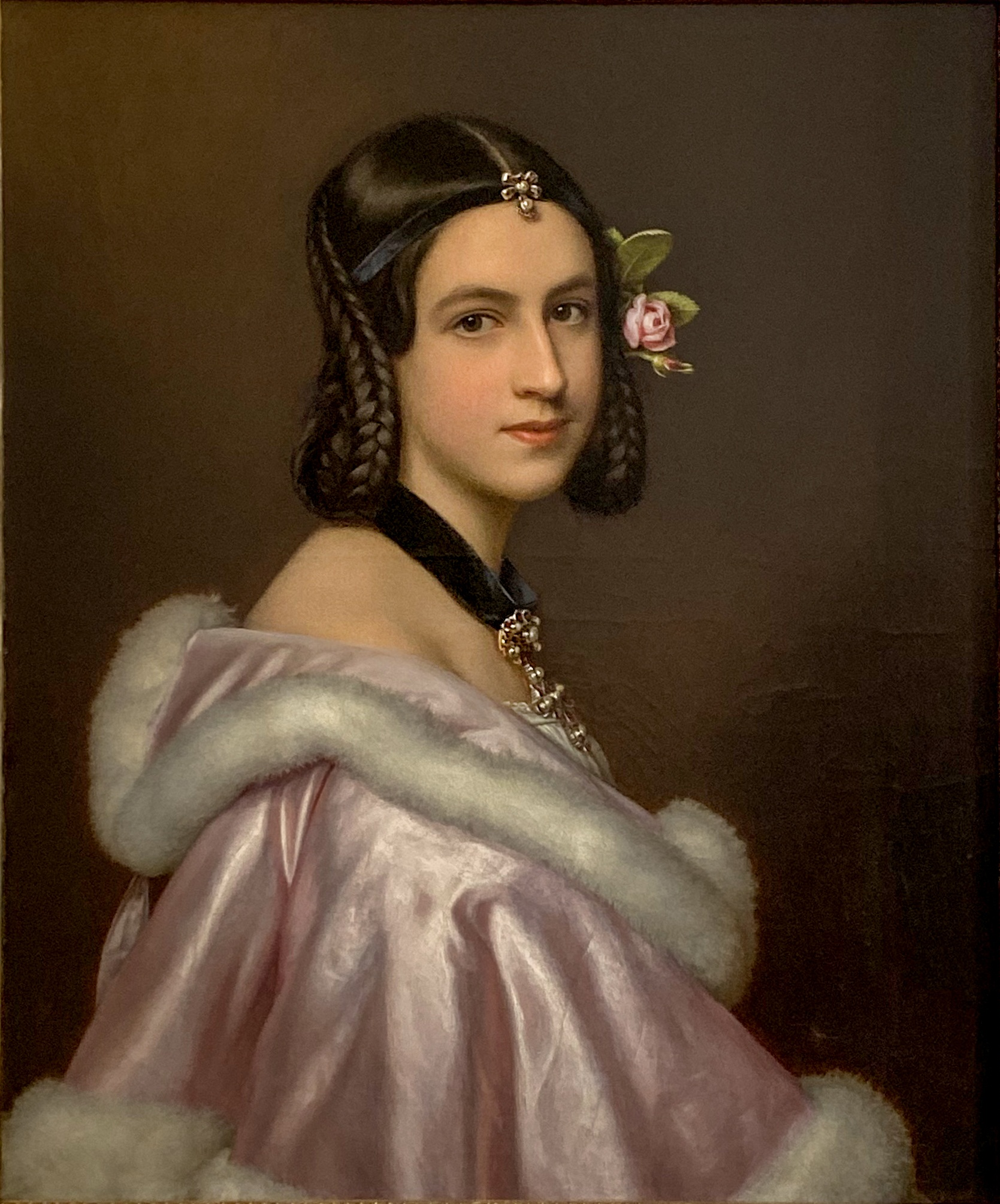
19 years old Jane Erskine in a painting for the Gallery of Beauties in 1837.

Jane Plumer Callander (née Erskine; 9 May 1818, London - 30 March 1846, Scotland) was a British noblewoman whose portrait was included in the Gallery of Beauties of the Bavarian King Ludwig I. She was the daughter of David Erskine, 2nd Baron Erskine.

== Life ==
The Hon. Jane Plumer Erskine was born on 9 May 1818 in London. She was the sixth daughter of British ambassador to Munich and diplomat David Erskine, 2nd Baron Erskine, and his wife Frances Cadwalader (a daughter of General John Cadwalader).

Her paternal grandparents were Thomas Erskine, 1st Baron Erskine (the fourth son of Henry Erskine, 10th Earl of Buchan) and the former Frances Moore (a daughter of Daniel Moore). Her maternal grandparents were John Cadwalader, an American general during the Revolutionary War, and his second wife, Williamina Bond (daughter of Phineas Bond, of Philadelphia and niece of Thomas Bond).

== Portrait ==
Jane was introduced to King Ludwig I of Bavaria by his wife Queen Therese of Bavaria who thought she was a suitable subject for the beauty gallery. Queen Therese was the one who persuaded Jane to pose for the gallery.

In the portrait, Jane wears an exaggerated side curl coiffure with a braided rope of hair running around the back of her head.

== Personal life ==
Jane married her cousin, James Henry Callander, Esquire of Craig Forth (1803–1851) and moved to Scotland. They had three daughters:

- Fanny Jane Callander.
- Mary Hermione Callander, who married Charles Sartoris; and secondly George Henry Dawkins, of Over Norton Park.
- Janey Sevilla Callander, a theatre producer who married Lord Archibald Campbell, brother of John Campbell, 9th Duke of Argyll, on 12 January 1869. Their son Niall became the 10th Duke.

Jane died in 1846 in Scotland.
