= Thomas Egerton, 2nd Earl of Wilton =

British politician & peer (1799-1882)

The Right Honourable The Earl of Wilton GCH PC
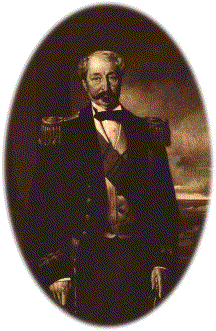

Lord Steward of the Household
- In office 2 January 1835 – 8 April 1835
- Monarch: William IV
- Prime Minister: Sir Robert Peel, Bt
- Preceded by: The Duke of Argyll
- Succeeded by: The Duke of Argyll

Personal details
- Born: 30 December 1799
- Died: 7 March 1882 (aged 82)
- Party: Tory
- Spouses: Lady Mary Stanley (m. 1821; died 1858) Isabella Smith (m. 1863)

Thomas Egerton, 2nd Earl of Wilton, GCH, PC (30 December 1799 – 7 March 1882), known as Thomas Grosvenor until 1814, was a British nobleman and Tory politician. He served as Lord Steward of the Household in 1835 in Sir Robert Peel's first government.

== Background ==
Wilton was the second son of Robert Grosvenor, 1st Marquess of Westminster and his wife Lady Eleanor Egerton, daughter of Thomas Egerton, 1st Earl of Wilton. Richard Grosvenor, 2nd Marquess of Westminster was his elder brother and Robert Grosvenor, 1st Baron Ebury, his younger brother. In 1814, at the age of 14, he succeeded to the earldom of Wilton according to a special remainder on the death of his maternal grandfather. He assumed by sign manual the surname of Egerton in lieu of Grosvenor in 1821. He also inherited Heaton Park through his maternal grandfather.

== Political career ==
Lord Wilton took his seat in the House of Lords on his twenty-first birthday in 1820. In January 1835 he was appointed Lord Steward of the Household in the Tory administration of Sir Robert Peel and the following February he was admitted to the Privy Council. However, the government fell in April 1835 and Lord Wilton was never to return to a government office.

== Horse racing ==
Lord Wilton was also a leading sportsman. Considered an expert horseman, he established the Heaton Park Races in 1827.

== Yachting ==
He was also interested in yachting, and was a founding member of the Royal Mersey Yacht Club in 1844. He was Commodore of the Royal Yacht Squadron from 1849 to 1881.

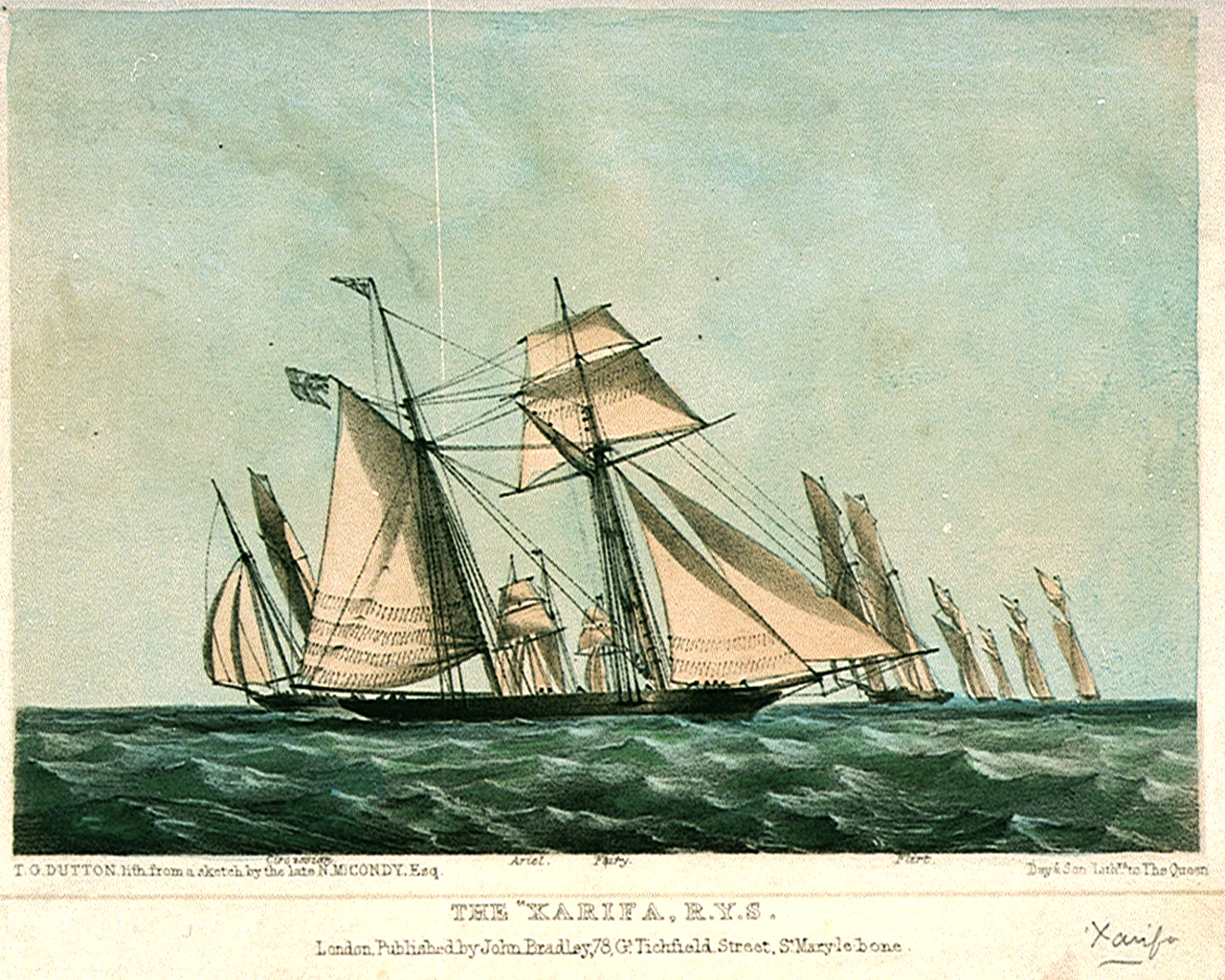
Lord Wilton's yacht "The Xarifa, RYS" with behind it the Circassian, Ariel, Fairy, and Flirt, circa 1845. Lithograph T G Dutton after a sketch by Nicholas Matthews Condy

In this capacity, he was most notable for inviting members of the New York Yacht Club to race in the Royal Yacht Squadron regatta open to all nations around the Isle of Wight on 22 August 1851. The N. Y. Y. C. yacht America won the event and its silver trophy was subsequently renamed the America's Cup.

Lord Wilton was inducted into the America's Cup Hall of Fame in 2001 in a ceremony at the Royal Yacht Squadron during the America's Cup Jubilee.

== Music ==
Lord Wilton was also a composer. He composed the anthem "O Praise the Lord, all ye heathen", a hymn titled "Hymn to Eros", as well as several other vocal compositions.

== Family ==
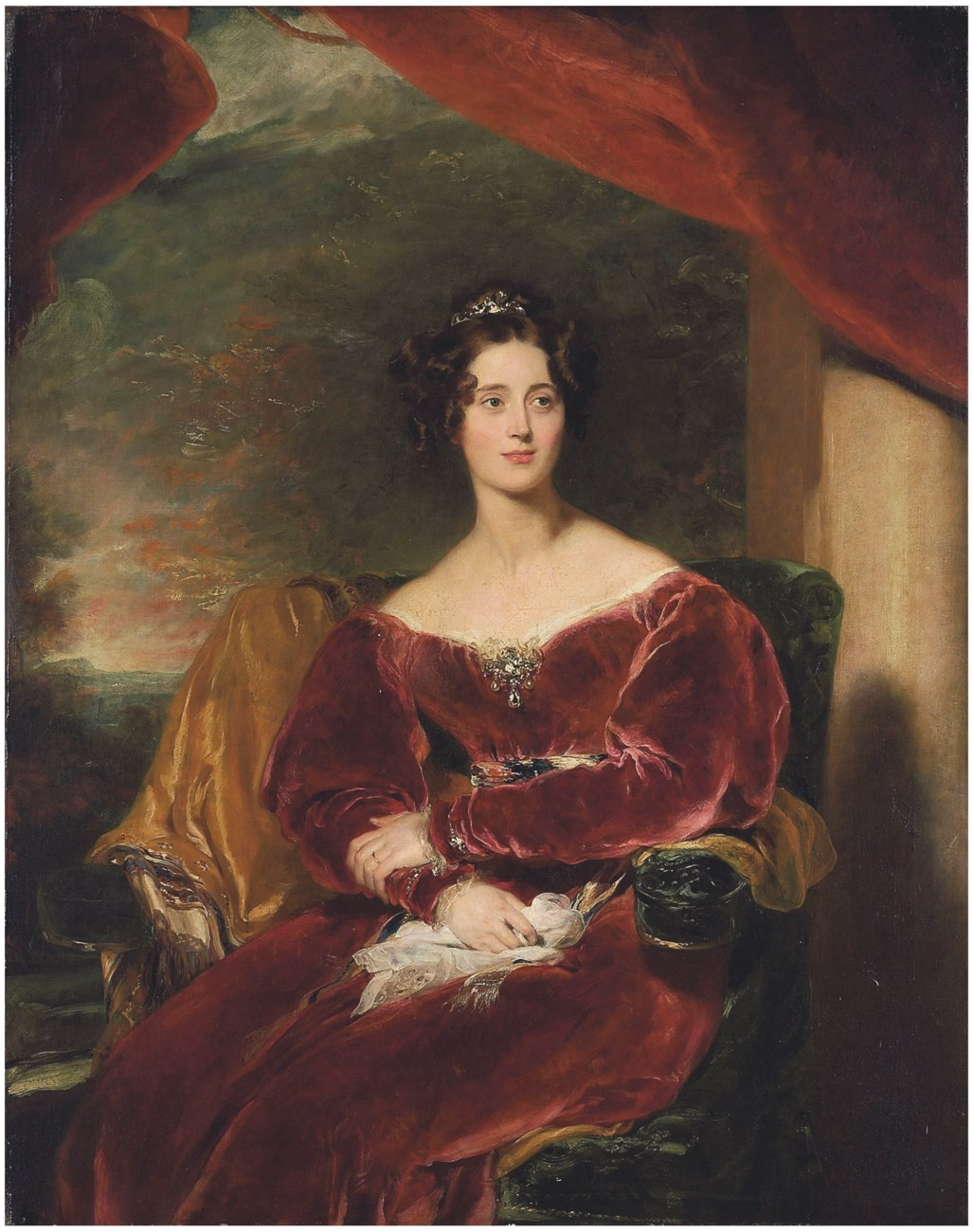
Portrait of the Countess of Wilton by Thomas Lawrence, 1829

Lord Wilton married firstly Lady Mary Stanley, daughter of the Edward Smith-Stanley, 12th Earl of Derby, in 1821. They had eleven children, of whom only five reached adulthood:

- Lady Eleanor Egerton (1823–1824).
- Thomas Egerton, Viscount Grey de Wilton (1825–1830).
- Lady Mary Egerton (1827–1838).
- Lady Margaret Egerton (1830–1831).
- Arthur Egerton, Viscount Grey de Wilton (1831-1831).
- Lady Elizabeth Egerton (1832–1892). Married Dudley FitzGerald-de Ros, 24th Baron de Ros in 1853.
- Arthur Egerton, 3rd Earl of Wilton (1833–1885).
- Lady Katherine Grey Egerton (1835–1920). Married the Hon. Henry John Coke (1827–1916), son of Thomas Coke, 1st Earl of Leicester.
- Lady Emily Egerton (1837–1839).
- Seymour Egerton, 4th Earl of Wilton (1839–1898). Married Laura Caroline, daughter of William Russell. They were parents of Arthur Egerton, 5th Earl of Wilton.
- Lady Alice Magdalene Grey Egerton (1842–1925). Married Sir Henry des Voeux, 5th Baronet.

For some time before his first wife's death in December 1858, Lord Wilton had been having a semi-public affair with the disreputable Caroline Cook (also known as Nelly or Lilly Cook) as well as with Lady Ailesbury. He married secondly Isabella Smith in September 1863. They had no children. Lord Wilton died in March 1883, aged 82, and was succeeded in the earldom by his third but eldest surviving son Arthur. The Countess of Wilton died in January 1916.

== See also ==
- Egerton family
- Duke of Westminster

Political offices
Preceded by The Duke of Argyll	Lord Steward of the Household; January 1835 – April 1835	Succeeded by The Duke of Argyll
Peerage of the United Kingdom
Preceded by Thomas Egerton	Earl of Wilton; 1814–1882	Succeeded by Arthur Egerton
