= Duke of Argyll =

Title in the peerage of Scotland and title in the peerage of the United Kingdom

Dukedom of Argyll
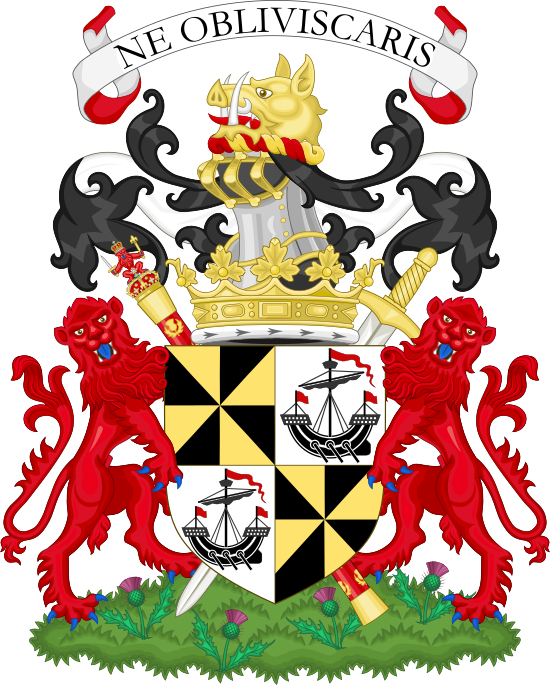
- Quarterly, 1st & 4th: Gyronny of eight or and sable (Campbell); 2nd & 3rd: Argent, a lymphad or ancient galley sails furled flags and pennants flying gules and oars in action sable (Lorne).
- Creation date: 21 June 1701
- Created by: William III and II
- Peerage: Peerage of Scotland
- First holder: Archibald Campbell, 10th Earl of Argyll
- Present holder: Torquhil Campbell, 13th Duke
- Heir apparent: Archie Campbell, Marquess of Lorne
- Remainder to: the 1st Duke's heirs male whomsoever
- Subsidiary titles: Marquess of Kintyre and Lorne; Earl of Argyll; Earl of Campbell and Cowal; Viscount of Lochaw and Glenyla; Lord Campbell; Lord Lorne; Lord Kintyre; Lord Inveraray, Mull, Morvern, and Tiree; Baron Sundridge; Baron Hamilton
- Seat: Inveraray Castle
- Former seats: Argyll's Lodging; Castle Campbell; Ardencaple Castle; Rosneath House

Duke of Argyll (Scottish Gaelic: Diùc Earraghàidheil) is a title created in the Peerage of Scotland in 1701 and in the Peerage of the United Kingdom in 1892. The earls, marquesses, and dukes of Argyll were for several centuries among the most powerful noble families in Scotland. As such, they played a major role in Scottish history throughout the 16th, 17th, and 18th centuries. The Duke of Argyll also holds the hereditary titles of chief of Clan Campbell and Master of the Household of Scotland.

Since 2001, Torquhil Campbell has been Duke of Argyll and is the thirteenth man to hold the title.

== History ==
Sir Colin Campbell of Lochow was knighted in 1280. In 1445, James II of Scotland raised Sir Colin's descendant Sir Duncan Campbell to the peerage to become Duncan Campbell of Lochow, Lord of Argyll, Knight, 1st Lord Campbell. In 1453, Colin Campbell (c. 1433–1493) succeeded his grandfather as the 2nd Lord Campbell and was created Earl of Argyll in 1457.

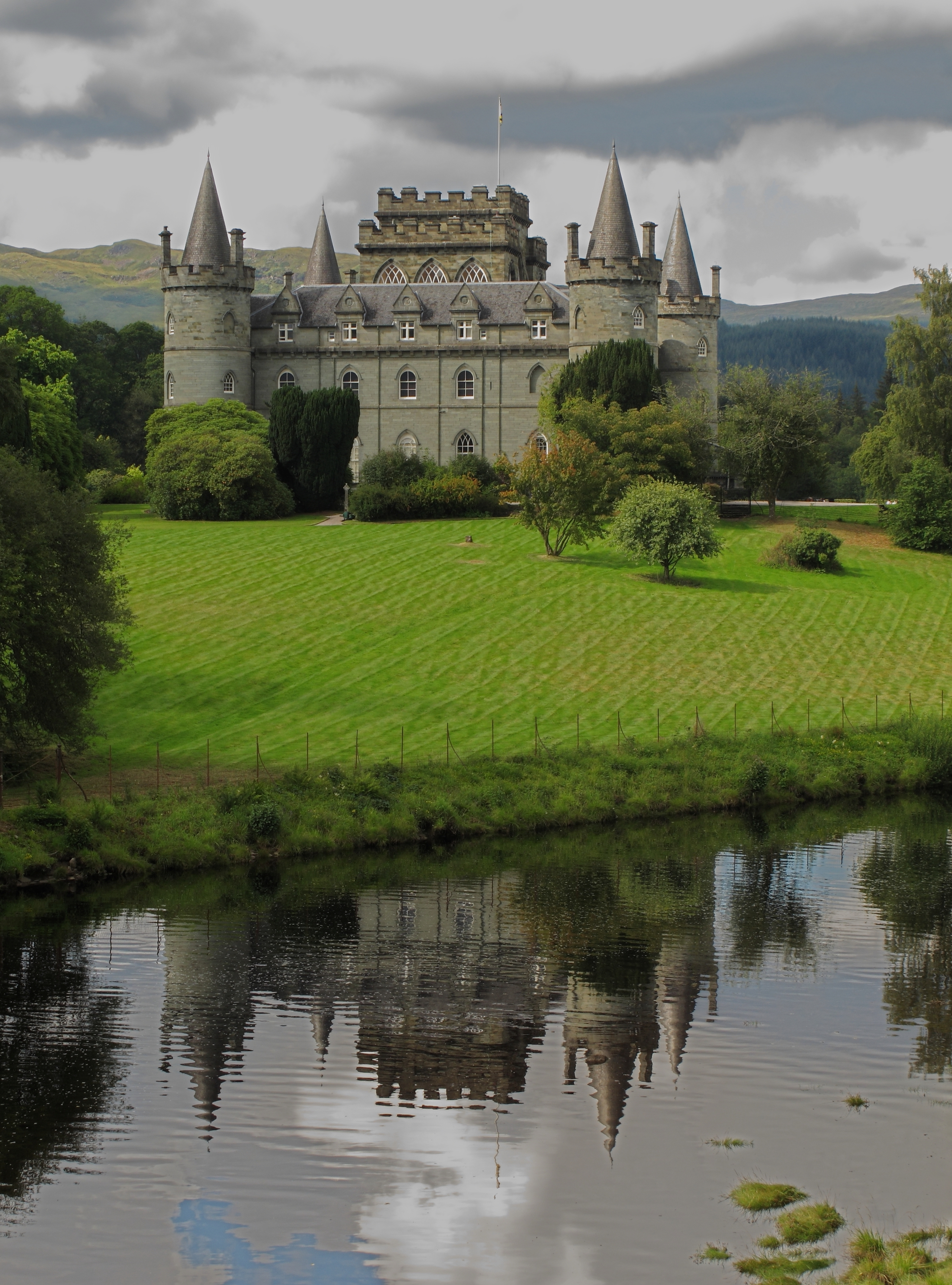
Inveraray Castle, the principal family seat of the Dukes of Argyll

The 8th Earl of Argyll was created a marquess in 1641, when Charles I visited Scotland and attempted to quell the rising political crisis (and the fall-out from the event known as The Incident). With Oliver Cromwell's victory in England, the marquess became the effective ruler of Scotland. Upon the restoration, the marquess offered his services to King Charles II but was charged with treason and executed in 1661. His lands and titles were forfeited but, in 1663, they were restored to his son, Archibald, who became the 9th Earl of Argyll. In 1685, he was executed for his part in the Monmouth Rebellion.

On 21 June 1701, the 9th Earl's son, Archibald, was created Duke of Argyll, Marquess of Kintyre and Lorne, Earl of Campbell and Cowal, Viscount of Lochow and Glenyla, Lord Inveraray, Mull, Morvern, and Tiree for his services to William of Orange. His son, the 2nd Duke, was created Baron Chatham and Earl of Greenwich in 1705 as a reward for his support for the Act of Union and further elevated to the title Duke of Greenwich in 1719. Upon his death his Scottish titles passed to his brother and the English titles became extinct.

The 5th Duke sat as a member of parliament for Glasgow Burghs until his father's accession to the Dukedom in 1761 disqualified him from representing a Scottish seat. He then became the member for Dover until 1766, when he was created Baron Sundridge and obtained the right to sit in the House of Lords.

On 17 April 1892, the 8th Duke was created Duke of Argyll in the Peerage of the United Kingdom. Thus, the Duke is one of only five people to hold two or more different dukedoms, the others being the Duke of Cornwall and Rothesay, the Duke of Buccleuch and Queensberry, the Duke of Hamilton and Brandon, and the Duke of Richmond, Lennox, and Gordon.

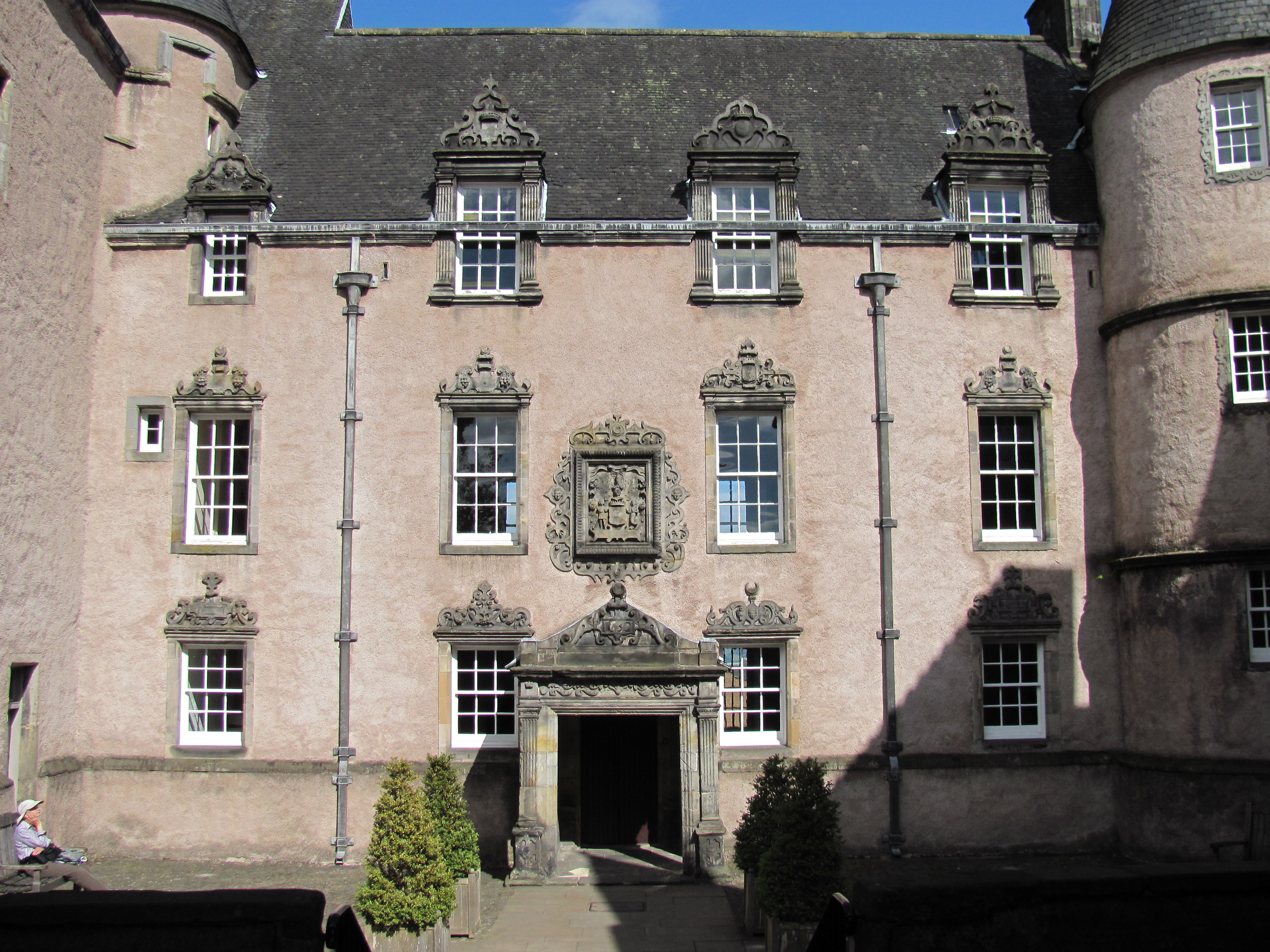
Argyll's Lodging served as the family townhouse in Stirling

During the 19th century, a distant Prussian descendant of the family, Jenny von Westphalen, became the wife of the philosopher Karl Marx. In a famous story, when exiled to Paris and reduced to poverty, Marx was nearly arrested for attempting to pawn a part of Jenny's dowry: a silver dinner service bearing the coat of arms of the House of Argyll. Of the incident Marx wrote to Engels, possibly in an attempt to solicit another loan from his wealthy friend: "My wife cried all night". However, the silver was eventually sold to pay off long-standing debts incurred by the Neue Rheinische Zeitung.

In the late 19th century, the then current Duke of Argyll visited America. While there, he stayed at the American Hotel situated in the main square of the village of Babylon, New York. The townspeople took a liking to the duke, and festivals and parades took place while he visited there. Just before the turn of the century (1900), the township of Babylon renamed the Bythbourne Lake/Park to Argyle Lake/Park (Argyll evolved to the currently accepted Argyle) in memory of the duke's visit.

== Estates and residences ==
=== Family seat ===
The family seat is Inveraray Castle beside Loch Fyne, Inveraray, Argyll. The estate, 75,000 acres, is a mixture of commercial forestry, residential property, sources of renewable energy, and a caravan park.

The principal burial place of the Dukes and Duchesses is St Munn's Parish Church, Kilmun. The 11th and 12th Dukes chose to be buried on the island of Inishail in Loch Awe.

=== Estates ===
In the 1883 edition of John Bateman's The Great Landowners of Great Britain and Ireland, George Campbell, 8th Duke of Argyll's estates were recorded as spanning 175,114 acres across Scotland, including 168,315 acres in Argyllshire and 6,799 acres in Dunbartonshire, which produced a combined annual income of £50,842.

=== London residences ===
==== Argyll House, King Street ====
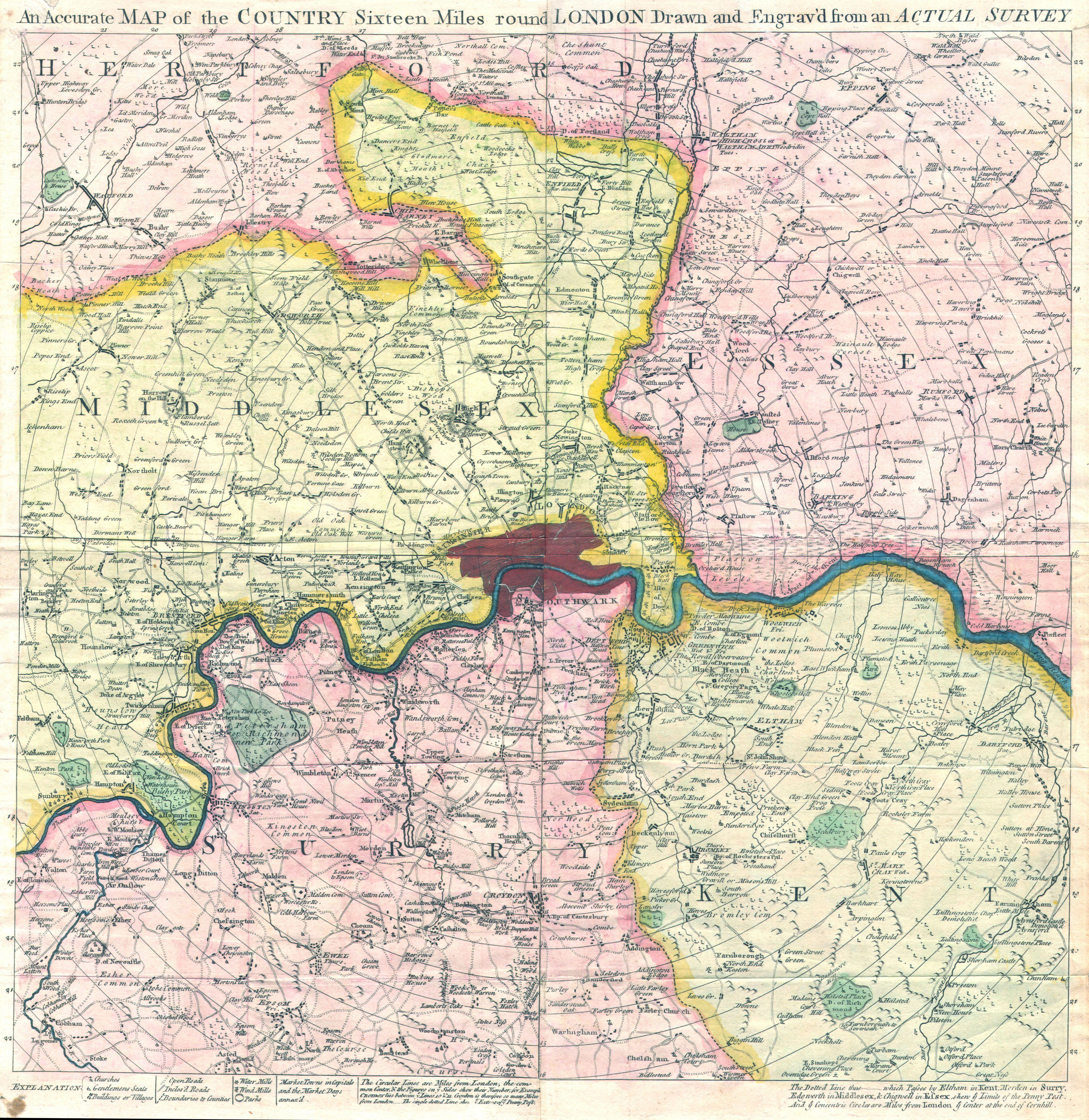
Extract from Gentleman's Magazine: Map of London & Environs, 1764, showing property of 'D. of Argyle' (the Duke of Argyll) near the River Thames in Ham in west London

In 1706, John Campbell, 2nd Duke of Argyll, became the inhabitant of a house on the east side of King Street, St James (Soho end), Westminster, which stood on a site occupied by the western end of Little Argyll Street. The house became known as Argyll House; in 1735 or 1736, the Duke vacated the property for redevelopment. A succession of Argyll Houses followed in the same block of streets.

A water-colour drawing of Argyll House by T. H. Shepherd and two plans (at Inveraray Castle, engraved and undated) [depicted in this source] all suggest a house of little beauty and less convenience. Harriette Wilson, the sixth Duke's mistress, called it a 'dismal chateau' and described it, along with the Duke's meagre personal possessions, as 'old'.

— Extract from 'Argyll Street Area', Survey of London, 1963, London County Council, Vol. 31 & 32 at pp. 284–307

Following the death of John Campbell, 5th Duke of Argyll in 1806, the property was purchased by George Hamilton-Gordon, 4th Earl of Aberdeen.

In and before 1764, the family had a house near London at Ham, then in the county of Surrey, a parish historically associated with Richmond, and a nearby second holding (see map on right).

==== Argyll House, Chelsea ====
John Campbell, 4th Duke of Argyll, lived briefly at 211 King’s Road, Chelsea, London in 1769-1770, and the building subsequently retained the name Argyll House, Chelsea.

==== Argyll Lodge, Kensington ====
In 1854, George Campbell, 8th Duke of Argyll, purchased Bedford Lodge in Campden Hill, Kensington from the estate of Georgiana, Dowager Duchess of Bedford. The Duke renamed the property Argyll Lodge, and the house continued to be used as his London residence until his death in 1900. In 1901, Argyll Lodge was subsequently purchased by Walter Phillimore, 1st Baron Phillimore, who renamed the property Cam House. Cam House was eventually demolished in 1955 and the site of the property, as well as the neighbouring Moray Lodge, now forms part of Holland Park School.

==== Apartment 1, Kensington Palace ====
The 8th Duke's son, John Campbell, Marquess of Lorne, had married Queen Victoria’s daughter The Princess Louise in 1871, and the couple were granted use of Apartment 1, Kensington Palace as a Grace-and-favour residence by the Queen during the early 1870s. The apartment continued to be the couple's London residence following Lord Lorne's succession as 9th Duke of Argyll in 1900.

==== Clarges Street, Mayfair ====
Following the death of the childless Ninth Duke in 1914, he was succeeded by his nephew Niall Campbell, 10th Duke of Argyll. Since c. 1905, the 10th Duke had leased an apartment in a medium-sized townhouse at No. 28 Clarges Street, Mayfair, that was his London residence until early 1927. He later leased a serviced apartment at No. 2 Observatory Gardens in Kensington from June 1927 until late 1935. As the 10th Duke never married, when he died in 1949 he was succeeded by his first-cousin-once-removed Ian Campbell, 11th Duke of Argyll.

==== Upper Grosvenor Street, Mayfair ====
In 1951, the 11th Duke was married for a third time to a wealthy divorcee and heiress Margaret Sweeny, the only daughter of self-made millionaire and Celanese Corporation Chairman George Whigman. Margaret’s townhouse at No. 48 Upper Grosvenor Street, Mayfair served as the Duke’s London home until the couple separated in 1959.

== Subsidiary titles ==
The Duke holds several subsidiary titles, including: Marquess of Kintyre and Lorne (created 1701), Earl of Argyll (created 1457), Earl Campbell and Cowall and Viscount Lochow and Glenyla (created 1701), Lord Campbell (created 1445), Lord Lorne (created 1470), Lord Kintyre (created 1626), Lord Inveraray, Mull, Mover and Tiry (created 1701), Baron Hamilton of Hameldon (created 1776) and Baron Sundridge (created 1766). They are in the Peerage of Scotland, except the last two, which are in the Peerage of Great Britain. The Duke is also a Baronet of Lundie (created 1627) in the Baronetage of Nova Scotia. The courtesy title for the Duke's eldest son and heir is Marquess of Lorne, shortened from Marquess of Kintyre and Lorne.

== Hereditary offices ==
- Hereditary Master of the Royal Household of Scotland
- Hereditary High Justiciar of Argyll
- Admiral of the Western Coasts and Isles
- Hereditary Keeper of the Royal Castles of: Carrick, Dunoon, Dunstaffnage, Tarbert
- Hereditary High Sheriff of Argyllshire
- Member King's Body Guard for Scotland

The Duke of Argyll is also the chief of the Scottish clan of Campbell and in this capacity is known as MacCailein Mòr, which is Gaelic for "The Great MacColin" referring to Cailean Mór (Colin the Great) of Lochawe (Colin of Lochow) who was killed in fighting with Alexander, Lord of Lorne in 1296.

Since James IV's reign, the Duke has also held the position of Master of the Household of Scotland.

== Coat of arms ==
The heraldic blazon for the coat of arms of the dukedom is: Quarterly: 1st and 4th gyronny of eight or and sable (for Campbell); 2nd and 3rd argent, a lymphad, sails furled and oars in action sable, flags and pennants flying gules (for Lorne).

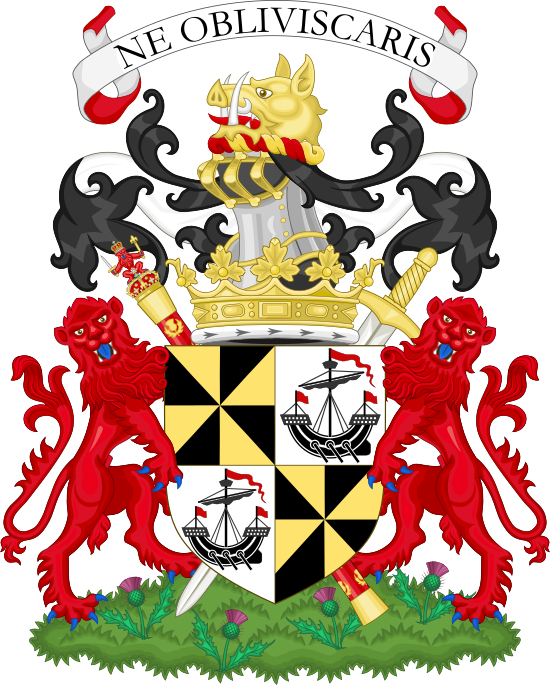
Armorial achievement

Heraldic shield

== List of title holders ==
=== Lords Campbell (1445) ===
- Duncan Campbell, 1st Lord Campbell (d. 1453)
  - Archibald Campbell, Master of Campbell (d. c. 1431–1440) (eldest son of the 1st Lord, died before his father was created a Lord of Parliament)
- Colin Campbell, 2nd Lord Campbell (c. 1433–1493) (created Earl of Argyll in 1457)

=== Earls of Argyll (1457) ===
- Colin Campbell, 1st Earl of Argyll (c. 1433–1493) (only son of the Master)
- Archibald Campbell, 2nd Earl of Argyll (d. 1513) (eldest son of the 1st Earl)
- Colin Campbell, 3rd Earl of Argyll (c. 1486–1529) (eldest son of the 2nd Earl)
- Archibald Campbell, 4th Earl of Argyll (c. 1507–1558) (only son of the 3rd Earl)
- Archibald Campbell, 5th Earl of Argyll (c. 1537–1573) (elder son of the 4th Earl, died without issue)
- Colin Campbell, 6th Earl of Argyll (c. 1541/1546–1584) (younger son of the 4th Earl)
- Archibald Campbell, 7th Earl of Argyll (c. 1576–1638) (elder son of the 6th Earl)
- Archibald Campbell, 8th Earl of Argyll (1607–1661) (created Marquess of Argyll in 1641)

=== Marquesses of Argyll (1641) ===
- Archibald Campbell, 1st Marquess of Argyll (1607–1661) (elder son of the 7th Earl, was tried for high treason, attainted and all his honours forfeit in 1661)

=== Earls of Argyll (1457; restored 1663) ===
- Archibald Campbell, 9th Earl of Argyll (c. 1629–1685) (elder son of the 1st Marquess, was restored in 1663 to his father's honours, excepting his Marquessate. He was later tried for high treason and all his honours forfeit in 1681)
- Archibald Campbell, 10th Earl of Argyll (1658–1703) (Elder son of the 9th Earl, restored to his father's honours in 1685, created Duke of Argyll in 1701)

=== Dukes of Argyll (1701) ===
- Archibald Campbell, 1st Duke of Argyll (1658–1703) (eldest son of the 9th Earl, was restored to his father's honours in 1685)
- John Campbell, 2nd Duke of Argyll, 1st Duke of Greenwich (1680–1743) (eldest son of the 1st Duke, died without male issue)
- Archibald Campbell, 3rd Duke of Argyll (1682–1761) (second and youngest son of the 1st Duke, died without legitimate issue)
- John Campbell, 4th Duke of Argyll (1693–1770) (eldest son of John Campbell, second son of the 9th Earl and younger brother of the 1st Duke)
- John Campbell, 5th Duke of Argyll (1723–1806) (elder/est son of the 4th Duke)
  - George John Campbell, Earl of Campbell (1763–1764) (eldest son of the 5th Duke, died in infancy)
- George William Campbell, 6th Duke of Argyll (1768–1839) (second son of the 5th Duke, died without issue)
- John Douglas Edward Henry Campbell, 7th Duke of Argyll (1777–1847) (third and youngest son of the 5th Duke)
  - John Henry Campbell (1821–1837) (eldest son of the 7th Duke, died young)
- George John Douglas Campbell, 8th Duke of Argyll (1823–1900) (second and younger son of the 7th Duke, created Duke of Argyll in the Peerage of the United Kingdom in 1892)
- John George Edward Henry Douglas Sutherland Campbell, 9th Duke of Argyll (S) and 2nd Duke of Argyll (UK) (1845–1914) (eldest son of the 8th Duke, married The Princess Louise, daughter of Queen Victoria, but died without issue)
- Niall Diarmid Campbell, 10th Duke of Argyll (S) and 3rd Duke of Argyll (UK) (1872–1949) (only son of Lord Archibald Campbell, second son of the 8th Duke, died unmarried)
- Ian Douglas Campbell, 11th Duke of Argyll (S) and 4th Duke of Argyll (UK) (1903–1973) (grandson of Lord Walter Campbell, third son of the 8th Duke)
- Ian Campbell, 12th Duke of Argyll (S) and 5th Duke of Argyll (UK) (1937–2001) (eldest son of the 11th Duke)
- Torquhil Ian Campbell, 13th Duke of Argyll (S) and 6th Duke of Argyll (UK) (b. 1968) (only son of the 12th Duke)

The heir apparent is the present holder's eldest son, Archibald Frederick Campbell, Marquess of Lorne (b. 2004).

=== Lords Kintyre (1626) ===
- James Campbell, 1st Earl of Irvine, 1st Lord Kintyre (1626–1645)
- Archibald Campbell, 1st Marquess of Argyll, 2nd Lord Kintyre (1607–1661)

For further succession see above

=== Campbell baronets, of Lundie (1627) ===
- Colin Campbell, 1st Baronet (b. 1599) (only son of the younger son of the 6th Earl)
- Colin Campbell, 2nd Baronet (d. 1696) (only son of the 1st Baronet, died without issue)
- Archibald Campbell, 1st Duke of Argyll (1658–1703)

For further succession see above

== Family tree ==
Family tree: Dukes of Argyll with subsidiary titles

Lord Campbell, 1445
Duncan Campbell d. 1453; 1st Lord Campbell
Archibald Campbell d. c. 1431–1440; Master of Campbell
Earl of Argyll, 1457
Colin Campbell c. 1433–1493; 1st Earl of Argyll, 2nd Lord Campbell
Archibald Campbell d. 1513; 2nd Earl of Argyll, 3rd Lord Campbell
Colin Campbell c. 1486–1529; 3rd Earl of Argyll, 4th Lord Campbell
Archibald Campbell c. 1507–1558; 4th Earl of Argyll, 5th Lord Campbell
Archibald Campbell c. 1532–1576; 5th Earl of Argyll, 6th Lord Campbell	Colin Campbell c. 1542–1584; 6th Earl of Argyll, 7th Lord Campbell
Archibald Campbell; 1575–1638; 7th Earl of Argyll, 8th Lord Campbell
Marquess of Argyll, 1641	Lord of Kintyre, 1627; Earl of Irvine and Lord Lundie, 1642
Archibald Campbell; 1607–1661; 1st Marquess of Argyll, 8th Earl of Argyll, 9th Lord Campbell	James Campbell; 1610–1645; Earl of Irvine, etc.
Earldom and Marquessate of Argyll forfeit, 1661	Earldom of Irvine extinct, 1645
Earl of Argyll (restored), 1663
Archibald Campbell; 1629–1685; 9th Earl of Argyll, 10th Lord Campbell
Earldom of Argyll forfeit, 1681
Earl of Argyll (restored), 1685; Duke of Argyll (Scotland), Marquess of Kintyre and Lorne, Earl of Campbell and Cowall, Viscount Lochow and Glenyla, Lord Inveraray, Mull, Morvern, and Tiree, 1701
Archibald Campbell; 1658–1703; 1st Duke of Argyll, etc., 10th Earl of Argyll, 11th Lord Campbell	John Campbell d. 1729
Earl of Greenwich and Baron Chatham, 1705; Duke of Greenwich, 1719	Earl of Ilay, 1706
John Campbell; 1680–1743; 2nd Duke of Argyll, etc., Duke of Greenwich, etc., 11th Earl of Argyll, 12th Lord Campbell	Archibald Campbell; 1682–1761; 3rd Duke of Argyll, etc., 12th Earl of Argyll, 13th Lord Campbell, Earl of Ilay	John Campbell c. 1693–1770; 4th Duke of Argyll, etc., 13th Earl of Argyll, 14th Lord Campbell
Dukedom and Earldom of Greenwich and Barony Chatham extinct, 1743	Earldom of Islay extinct, 1761
Baron Hamilton of Hameldon, 1776	Baron Sundridge, 1766
Elizabeth Gunning; 1733–1790; 1st Baroness Hamilton of Hameldon	John Campbell; 1723–1806; 5th Duke of Argyll, etc., 14th Earl of Argyll, 15th Lord Campbell, 1st Baron Sundridge
Douglas Hamilton; 1756–1799; 8th Duke of Hamilton, 5th Duke of Brandon, 2nd Baron Hamilton of Hameldon	George William Campbell; 1766–1839; 6th Duke of Argyll, etc., 15th Earl of Argyll, 16th Lord Campbell, 2nd Baron Sundridge, 3rd Baron Hamilton of Hameldon (Note: Succeeded his half-brother from his mother's first marriage to the 6th Duke of Hamilton as Baron Hamilton.)	John Douglas Edward Henry Campbell; 1777–1847; 7th Duke of Argyll, etc., 16th Earl of Argyll, 17th Lord Campbell, 3rd Baron Sundridge, 4th Baron Hamilton of Hameldon
Duke of Argyll (UK), 1892
Queen Victoria; 1819–1901	John Henry Campbell; 1821–1837	George Douglas Campbell; 1823–1900; 8th Duke of Argyll (Scotland), etc., 1st Duke of Argyll (UK), 17th Earl of Argyll, 18th Lord Campbell, 4th Baron Sundridge, 5th Baron Hamilton of Hameldon, 11th Lord of Kintyre, 17th Lord Lorne
Princess Louise; 1849–1939	John George Edward Henry Douglas Sutherland Campbell; 1845–1914; 9th Duke of Argyll (Scotland), etc., 2nd Duke of Argyll (UK), 18th Earl of Argyll, 19th Lord Campbell, 5th Baron Sundridge, 6th Baron Hamilton of Hameldon, 12th Lord of Kintyre, 18th Lord Lorne	Lord Archibald Campbell; 1846–1913	Lord Walter Campbell; 1848–1889
Niall Diarmid Campbell; 1872–1948; 10th Duke of Argyll (Scotland), etc., 3rd Duke of Argyll (UK), 19th Earl of Argyll, 20th Lord Campbell, 6th Baron Sundridge, 7th Baron Hamilton of Hameldon, 13th Lord of Kintyre, 19th Lord Lorne	Douglas Walter Campbell; 1877–1926
Ian Douglas Campbell; 1903–1973; 11th Duke of Argyll (Scotland), etc., 4th Duke of Argyll (UK), 20th Earl of Argyll, 21st Lord Campbell, 7th Baron Sundridge, 8th Baron Hamilton of Hameldon, 14th Lord of Kintyre, 20th Lord Lorne
Ian Campbell; 1937–2001; 12th Duke of Argyll (Scotland), etc., 5th Duke of Argyll (UK), 21st Earl of Argyll, 22nd Lord Campbell, 8th Baron Sundridge, 9th Baron Hamilton of Hameldon, 15th Lord of Kintyre, 21st Lord Lorne
Torquhil Ian Campbell b. 1968; 13th Duke of Argyll (Scotland), etc., 6th Duke of Argyll (UK), 22nd Earl of Argyll, 23rd Lord Campbell, 9th Baron Sundridge, 10th Baron Hamilton of Hameldon, 16th Lord of Kintyre, 22nd Lord Lorne
Archie Frederick Campbell b. 2004 styled Marquess of Lorne

== Current line of succession ==
- Ian Campbell, 11th Duke of Argyll (1903-1973)
  - Ian Campbell, 12th Duke of Argyll (1937-2001)
    - Torquhil Campbell, 13th Duke of Argyll (b. 1968)
      - (1) Archibald Friedrich Campbell, Marquess of Lorne (b. 2004), known as Archie Lorne
      - (2) Lord Rory James Campbell (b. 2006)
  - (3) Lord Colin Ivar Campbell (b. 1946)

== See also ==
- Princess Louise, Duchess of Argyll (1848–1939), wife of the 9th Duke
- Margaret, Duchess of Argyll (1912–1993), wife of the 11th Duke
- Earl Cawdor
- Clan Campbell
- Duke of Argyll's Tea Tree

== Literary references ==
The 2nd Duke of Argyll features prominently in the novel The Heart of Midlothian by Sir Walter Scott.
