= Janey Sevilla Callander =

Scottish theatre producer and society hostess

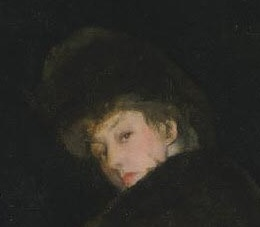
Whistler, Arrangement in Black; The Lady in the Yellow Buskin - Portrait of Lady Archibald Campbell (detail), 1882-84

Janey, Lady Archibald Campbell (née Janey Sevilla Callander; 18 March 1846, Craigforth House, Stirlingshire – 15 July 1923, Coombe Hill Farm, Norbiton) was a Scottish theatre producer and society hostess.

== Life ==
One of three daughters of James Henry Callander of Craigforth and Ardkinglas by his first wife Jane Plumer Erskine, she was left an orphan by aged four by the death of her mother, then her stepmother and finally her father. She thus became a ward of her stepmother's relation George Campbell, 8th Duke of Argyll, growing up at his Inveraray Castle and marrying his second son Lord Archibald Campbell (1846–1913) on 12 January 1869 (their children included Niall Campbell, 10th Duke of Argyll).

She became a friend of James Abbott McNeill Whistler (he produced three three-quarter-length portraits of her, including Lady in a Yellow Buskin, whilst her 1886 book Rainbow Music or The Philosophy of Harmony in Colour-Grouping was a much influenced by his art) and produced several theatrical productions noted for their pastoral values, such as a Romeo and Juliet put on at Cadgwith, Cornwall in summer 1880 starring Helena Modjeska and Johnston Forbes-Robertson. Janey, Lady Archibald Campbell was described as beautiful, bewitching and eccentric; Oscar Wilde once described her as "The Moon Lady" with her beautiful beryl eyes.

She also wrote under the name of Lady Archibald Campbell, and between 1905 and 1914, she published articles on topics of esoterica and Celtic mythology in the UK periodical The Occult Review. She used, for instance, her contacts in the Highlands to give accounts of Gaelic fairylore.
