= James Henry Callander =

Scottish politician

James Henry Callander (18 August 1803 – 31 January 1851), of Craigforth, Stirlingshire, was a Scottish politician.

== Background ==
Callander was the eldest son of Colonel George Callander of Craigforth, son of Sir James Campbell Callander and Elizabeth MacDonnell, daughter of the 5th Earl of Antrim. His mother was Elizabeth Erskine.

== Career ==
Callander was the 5th Callander Laird of Craigforth, Stirlingshire, and 16th Laird of Ardkinglas, Argyllshire. He sat as Member of Parliament for Argyllshire from 1832 to 1835.

== Family ==
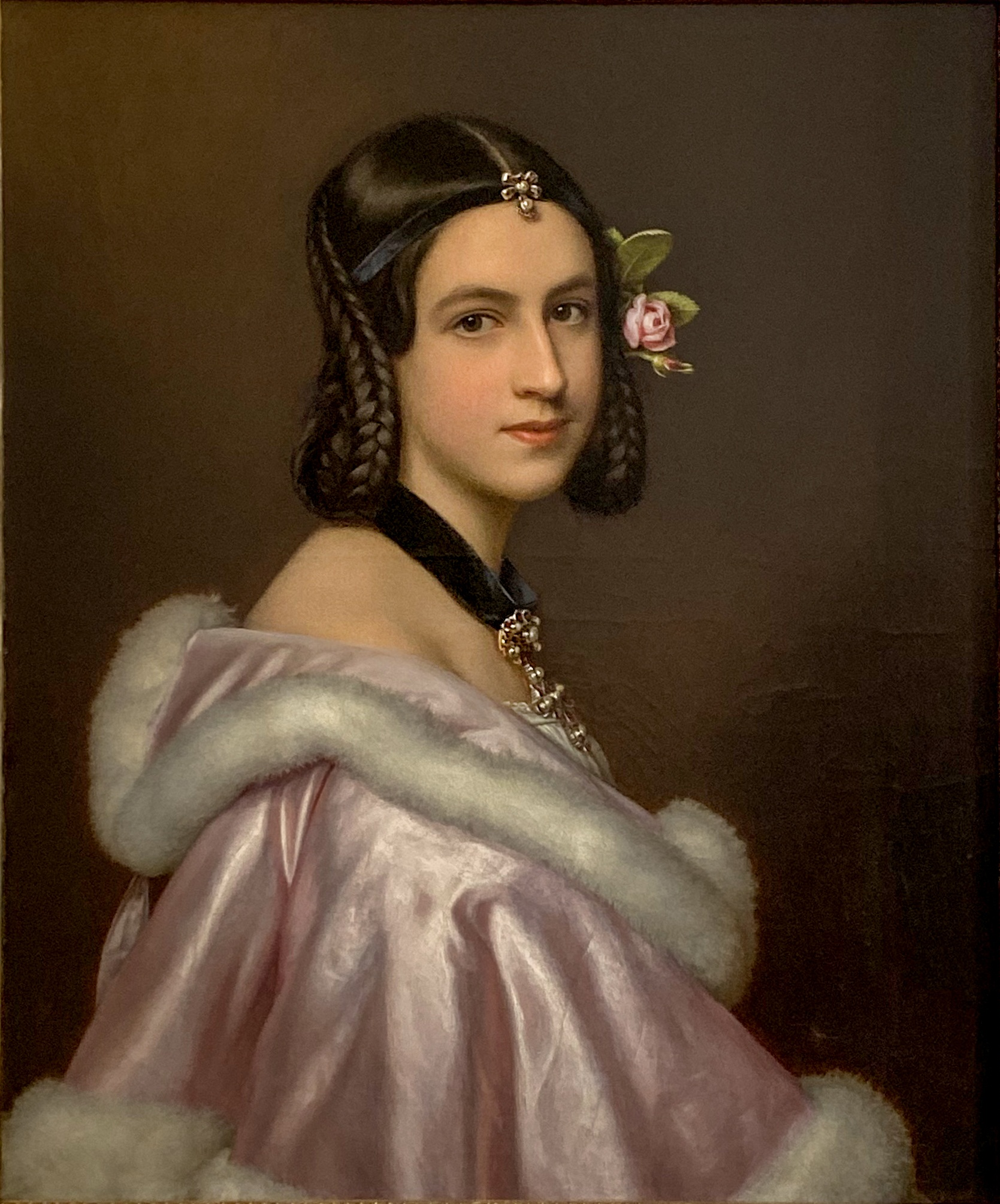
Callander's first wife, Jane Erskine, c. 1838, in the Gallery of Beauties.

Callander married firstly his cousin Jane Plumer Erskine (1818–1846), daughter of David Erskine, 2nd Baron Erskine and Frances Cadwalader, on 29 August 1837. They had three daughters:

- Fanny Jane Callander.
- Mary Hermione Callander, who married Charles Sartoris; and secondly George Henry Dawkins, of Over Norton Park.
- Janey Sevilla Callander, a theatre producer who married Lord Archibald Campbell, brother of John Campbell, 9th Duke of Argyll, on 12 January 1869. Their son Niall became the 10th Duke.

After his first wife's death in 1846 Callander married as his second wife Charlotte Edith Eleanora Campbell (1827-1849), daughter of John George Campbell of Ardpatrick, Argyll, on 1 July 1847. They had two sons

- George Frederick William Livingston-Campbell-Callander, who succeeded to Craigforth and Ardkinglas.
- Henry Barrington Callander of Ardchyline.

Callander died in January 1851.

Parliament of the United Kingdom
Preceded by Walter Frederick Campbell	Member of Parliament for Argyllshire; 1832–1835	Succeeded by Walter Frederick Campbell
