= George Campbell, 6th Duke of Argyll =

Scottish politician and nobleman

His Grace The Duke of Argyll GCH PC
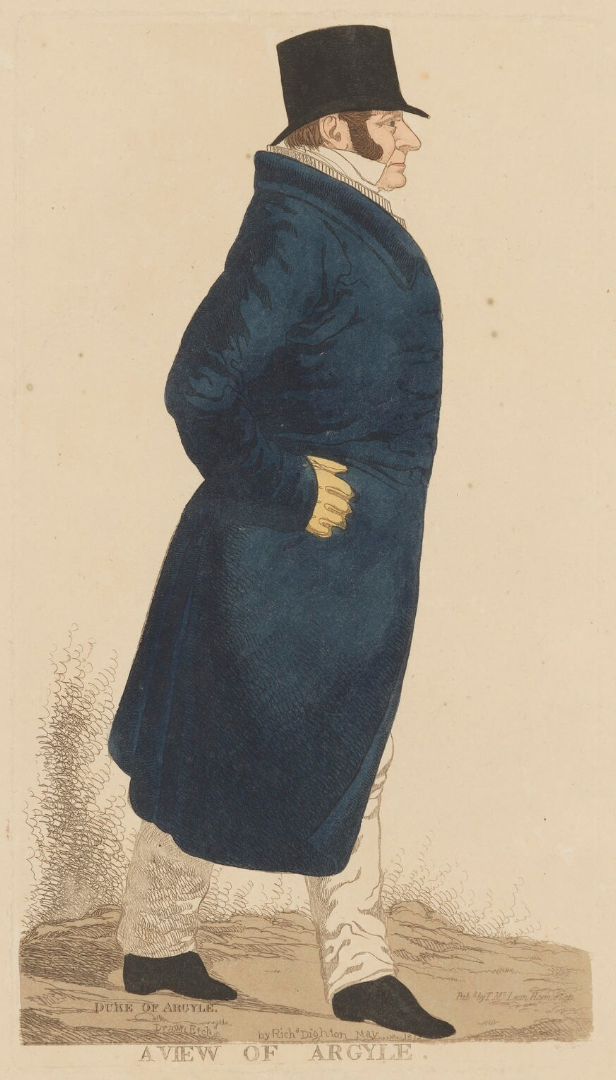
- 'A view of Argyle' colour etching, 1819.

Lord Steward of the Household
- In office 11 September 1833 – 14 November 1834
- Monarch: William IV
- Prime Minister: The Earl Grey; The Viscount Melbourne
- Preceded by: The Marquess Wellesley
- Succeeded by: The Earl of Wilton
- In office 23 April 1835 – 22 October 1839
- Monarchs: William IV; Victoria
- Prime Minister: The Viscount Melbourne
- Preceded by: The Earl of Wilton
- Succeeded by: The Earl of Erroll

Personal details
- Born: 22 September 1768
- Died: 22 October 1839 (aged 71) Inveraray Castle, Argyllshire
- Spouse: Lady Caroline Villiers (m. 1810; died 1835)
- Parent(s): John Campbell, 5th Duke of Argyll; Elizabeth Gunning

George William Campbell, 6th Duke of Argyll, GCH, PC (22 September 1768 – 22 October 1839), styled Earl of Campbell from 1768 to 1770 and Marquess of Lorne from 1770 to 1806, was a Scottish Whig politician and nobleman.

== Background ==
Argyll was the eldest son of John Campbell, 5th Duke of Argyll and his wife, Elizabeth Campbell, 1st Baroness Hamilton, daughter of Colonel John Gunning.

== Career ==
Argyll sat as Member of Parliament for St Germans from 1790 to 1796. In 1806 he succeeded his father in the dukedom and entered the House of Lords. He was Lord Keeper of the Great Seal of Scotland from 1827 to 1828 and again from 1830 and 1839. In 1833 he was sworn of the Privy Council and appointed Lord Steward of the Household in the Whig administration headed by Lord Grey, a position he retained when Lord Melbourne became prime minister in July 1834. The Whigs fell from power in November 1834 but returned to office already in April 1835, when Argyll once again became Lord Steward under Melbourne. He continued in the post until his death in 1839. Argyll was also Lord-Lieutenant of Argyllshire from 1799 to 1839, and personally commanded the Inverary Regiment, Argyllshire Local Militia, 1808–1816.

== Family ==
Argyll married Lady Caroline Elizabeth Villiers, daughter of George Villiers, 4th Earl of Jersey, at Edinburgh, on 29 November 1810. She was the former wife of Argyll's friend Henry Paget, 1st Marquess of Anglesey. They had no children. He died in October 1839, aged 71 at Inveraray Castle, Argyllshire, and was buried on 10 November 1839 at Kilmun Parish Church in Kilmun, Cowal. His brother, Lord John Campbell, succeeded to his titles.

Parliament of Great Britain
Preceded by Sir Charles Hamilton; Samuel Smith	Member of Parliament for St Germans; 1790–1796; With: Edward Eliot 1790–1791; William Eliot 1791–1796	Succeeded by William Eliot; Lord Grey of Groby
Honorary titles
Preceded by The Duke of Argyll	Lord-Lieutenant of Argyllshire; 1799–1839	Succeeded by The Marquess of Breadalbane
Masonic offices
Preceded by The Duke of Hamilton	Grand Master of the Grand Lodge of Scotland; 1822–1823	Succeeded by The Viscount Glenorchy
Political offices
Preceded by The Duke of Gordon	Lord Keeper of the Great Seal of Scotland; 1827–1828	Succeeded by The Duke of Gordon
Preceded by The Duke of Gordon	Lord Keeper of the Great Seal of Scotland; 1830–1839	Succeeded by The Earl of Stair
Preceded by The Marquess Wellesley	Lord Steward; 1833–1834	Succeeded by The Earl of Wilton
Preceded by The Earl of Wilton	Lord Steward; 1835–1839	Succeeded by The Earl of Erroll
Peerage of Scotland
Preceded by John Campbell	Duke of Argyll; 1806–1839	Succeeded by John Campbell
Peerage of Great Britain
Preceded by Douglas Hamilton	Baron Hamilton of Hameldon; 1799-1839	Succeeded by John Campbell
