= Niall Campbell, 10th Duke of Argyll =

Scottish historian

The Duke in c. 1916.

Arms of the Dukes of Argyll

Niall Diarmid Campbell, 10th and 3rd Duke of Argyll (16 February 1872 – 20 August 1949) was a Scottish peer and historian, the 10th Duke of Argyll and 25th Chief of Clan Campbell.

== Background ==
Campbell was the son of Captain Lord Archibald Campbell, second son of George Campbell, 8th Duke of Argyll, and his wife Janey Sevilla Callander of Craigforth and Ardkinglas, daughter of James Henry Callander and Jane Erskine. His uncle was Lord Colin Campbell and his aunt by marriage was Princess Louise, Duchess of Argyll. He was educated at St George's School, Ascot and went then to Charterhouse School in Surrey.

Campbell studied at Christ Church, Oxford, where he graduated Bachelor of Arts in 1896. He was admitted to the Middle Temple on 1 November 1894 and withdrew without being Called to the Bar in 1917. In 1914, he succeeded his uncle John Campbell, 9th Duke of Argyll in his various hereditary titles and offices.

== Career ==
Following his inheritance, Campbell became Honorary Colonel of the 8th Battalion, Argyll and Sutherland Highlanders until his retirement in 1929. He was additionally Honorary Colonel of the 15th (Canadian) Argyll Light Infantry. Having been previously a Deputy Lieutenant from 1914, He funded the creation of the Inveraray Bell Tower, in memory of the Campbell Clan who died in the First World War.

Campbell was appointed Lord Lieutenant of Argyllshire in 1923, an office he held until his death in 1949. His seat was Inveraray Castle, Argyll and he was interred at Kilmun Parish Church.

== Personal life ==
Referred to as "Scotland's most picturesque Duke", Campbell hated telephones and motor cars and would indulge in eccentric behaviour, including greeting tourists with recitals from Italian operas. He spent his final years in what was called "monastic seclusion".

Fearing that the eccentricity from his maternal relationship could be inherited, he never married and died childless in 1949.

He was succeeded as duke by his first cousin, once removed, Ian Campbell, a great-grandson of the 8th Duke (via his third son).

== Ancestry ==
Ancestors of Niall Campbell, 10th Duke of Argyll

16. John Campbell, 5th Duke of Argyll
8. John Campbell, 7th Duke of Argyll
17. Elizabeth Gunning, 1st Baroness Hamilton of Hameldon
4. George Campbell, 8th Duke of Argyll
18. John Glassel
9. Joan Glassel
19. Helen Buchan
2. Lord Archibald Campbell
20. George Leveson-Gower, 1st Duke of Sutherland
10. George Sutherland-Leveson-Gower, 2nd Duke of Sutherland
21. Elizabeth Sutherland, 19th Countess of Sutherland
5. Lady Elizabeth Sutherland-Leveson-Gower
22. George Howard, 6th Earl of Carlisle
11. Lady Harriet Howard
23. Lady Georgiana Cavendish
1. Niall Campbell, 10th Duke of Argyll
24. James Callander
12. George Callander
25. Catherine Forbes
6. James Callander
26. Hon. Henry Erskine
13. Elizabeth Erskine
27. Christian Fullerton
3. Janey Callander
28. Thomas Erskine, 1st Baron Erskine
14. David Erskine, 2nd Baron Erskine
29. Frances Moore
7. Hon. Jane Erskine
30. John Cadwalader
15. Frances Cadwalader
31. Williamina Bond

Honorary titles
Preceded by The Marquess of Breadalbane	Lord Lieutenant of Argyllshire; 1923 – 1949	Succeeded by Sir Bruce Campbell
Peerage of Scotland
Preceded by John Campbell	Duke of Argyll; 1914 – 1949	Succeeded by Ian Campbell
Peerage of the United Kingdom
Preceded by John Campbell	Duke of Argyll; 1914 – 1949	Succeeded by Ian Campbell
