= Duncan Campbell, 1st Lord Campbell =

15th-century Scottish nobleman and politician

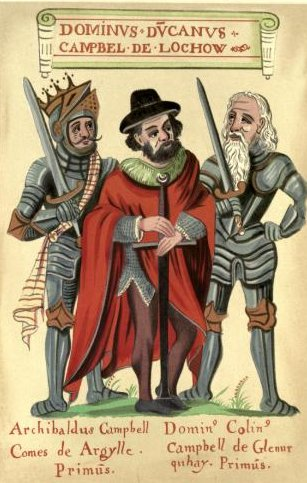
A 16th or 17th century illustration from The Black Book of Taymouth shows Duncan flanked by two of his descendants. On Duncan's right stands his grandson Colin Campbell, 1st Earl of Argyll and on his left is his son Colin of Glenorchy. (Description after Boardman, The Campbells.)

Duncan Campbell, 1st Lord Campbell (Classical Gaelic Donnchadh mac Cailein, and also called Donnchadh na-Adh, English: Duncan the fortunate) of Loch Awe (died 1453) was a Scottish nobleman and politician. He was an important figure in Scottish affairs in the first half of the 15th century and Justiciar of Argyll. He was head of the Clan Campbell for 40 years.

== Family ==
Duncan was born in 1390 in Lochow, Argyll. He was the son of Colin Campbell of Lochawe, and Mariota Campbell. Colin (called Colin Iongantach 'Wonderful', and 'Colin The Good Knight') was the eldest son of Archibald Campbell of Lochawe, while Mariota was the daughter of John Campbell, and thus heiress to the lands of Ardscotnish and Glen Orchy. Colin obtained a dispensation by 13 January 1366 permitting the marriage of Mariota to his son John. He evidently changed his plans and married Mariota himself as in 1372 he obtained a second dispensation, this allowing Colin and Mariota to remarry, after a separation, having already married although within the prohibited degree of kinship.

Duncan may not have been their eldest son: a brother named John Annam, John the Weak, is said to have been passed over. Duncan was seemingly the chosen heir by 6 February 1393 when he was granted the lands of Menstrie by his father. On Colin's death, sometime before 19 January 1414, Duncan became head of the Campbells of Loch Awe.

== Family ties ==
Duncan was twice married. His first wife was Marjorie Stewart (sometimes identified as Marcellina Stewart), daughter of Robert Stewart, Duke of Albany. She died before August 1432, but not before giving Duncan a son:

- Archibald Campbell, Master of Campbell, also known as Celestin Campbell, and Gillespic or Gillaspy Campbell (d. 1440); married Elizabeth Somerville, daughter of John Somerville, 3rd Lord Somerville; Archibald and Elizabeth were the parents of Colin Campbell, 2nd Lord Campbell (c. 1433–1493), created Earl of Argyll in 1457, also known as Colin M'Gillespic.

Duncan's second wife was Margaret Stewart of Ardgowan (d. after August 1442), the daughter of John Stewart of Ardgowan and Blackhall, an illegitimate son of King Robert III of Scotland. With Margaret Duncan had the following sons:

- Sir Colin Campbell of Glenurchy, born c. 1406, ancestor of the Breadalbane family.
- Neil Campbell of Ormidale (fl. 1442), from whom it is said the houses of Ormidale and Ellengreig descend; father of a son named Colin.
- Duncan Campbell of Auchinbreck (fl. 1452), said to have been first of the house of Auchinbreck.
- Archibald Campbell (fl. 1452) ancestor of the old family of Otter, now extinct.

Duncan's closeness to the Albany Stewarts led to King James I of Scotland viewing him with some suspicion, and James sent Duncan south as a hostage in England. The documentary record calls him Campbell of Argyll, and gives his share of the liability for the king's ransom as 1500 merks, more than any other hostage save one. In time Duncan and the king were somewhat reconciled and following James's assassination Duncan was among the supporters of Queen Dowager Joan.

== "The fortunate" ==
During the minority of King James II, Duncan professed support and loyalty to the regency, while constantly expanding his power in Argyll, often at the expense of the Crown. He was nevertheless knighted before March 1440 and created a Lord of Parliament as Lord Campbell of Lochawe by James II in 1445.

== Death ==
Duncan died between February 1453 and 21 May 1454, and was buried in the collegiate church at Kilmun, which he and his wife Margaret Stewart had founded in 1442 (see Kilmun Church). Their effigies can still be seen in a niche with a wide cusped arch.

His first successor was Archibald, Master of Campbell, also known as Archibald Roy of Kilbride since he was born in Kilbride, two miles from Inverary. Archibald Roy of Kilbride was the 14th Campbell, the Sixth McCailen More, and 16th Knight of Lochow.

His oldest son by his second marriage, Colin, was the founder of the Campbell of Breadalbane line (Earl of Breadalbane and Holland). His other sons by his second marriage, Archibald, Duncan, and Neil, created the Campbell septs of Otter, Auchinbreck, and Ormidale, respectively.

Duncan's grandson Colin, son of Archibald 'Gillespic,' (d. 1440) his only child by his first wife, succeeded him as Chief of the Clan Campbell.

== Notes ==
Peerage of Scotland
New creation	Lord Campbell; 1445–1453	Succeeded by Colin Campbell
