= Archibald Campbell, 2nd Earl of Argyll =

Scottish nobleman (c. 1465–1513)

- 2nd Earl of Argyll
- Tenure: 1493–1513
- Predecessor: Colin Campbell
- Successor: Colin Campbell
- Born: Gillespie Archibald Campbell c. 1465; Kingdom of Scotland
- Died: 9 September 1513; Branxton, Northumberland, England
- Cause of death: Killed at the Battle of Flodden
- Noble family: Campbell
- Spouse: Elizabeth Stewart
- Issue: 12, including Colin Campbell and Donald Campbell
- Parents: Colin Campbell, 1st Earl of Argyll; Isabel Stewart

Earl of Argyll's arms

Gillespie Archibald Campbell, 2nd Earl of Argyll (c. 1465 – 9 September 1513) was a Scottish nobleman and politician who was killed in the Battle of Flodden.

== Biography ==
Archibald was the eldest son of Colin Campbell, 1st Earl of Argyll and Isabel Stewart, daughter of John Stewart and Agnes MacDonald.

He was made the Master of the Royal Household of James IV of Scotland on 24 March 1495. After a crisis of law and order in the west of Scotland, Argyll was made governor of Tarbert Castle and Baillie of Knapdale, and this was followed by an appointment as Royal Lieutenant in the former Lordship of the Isles on 22 April 1500. Argyll eventually rose to the position of Lord High Chancellor of Scotland. His "clan" was rivalled only by Clan Gordon.

The Earls of Argyll were hereditary Sheriffs of Lorne and Argyll. However, a draft record of the 1504 Parliament of Scotland records a move to request the Earl of Argyll to hold his Sherriff Court in Perth, where the King and his council could more easily oversee proceedings, if the Earl was found at fault. The historian Norman Macdougall suggests this clause may have been provoked by Argyll's kinship with Torquil MacLeod and MacLean of Duart. These western chiefs supported the suppressed Lordship of the Isles.

The Earl of Argyll was killed at the Battle of Flodden on 9 September 1513, with the king and many others. He is buried at Kilmun Parish Church.

== Family ==
By his wife Elizabeth, a daughter of John Stewart, 1st Earl of Lennox and Margaret Montgomerie, had issue:

- Colin Campbell
- Archibald Campbell of Skipness (d 1537 escaping from Edinburgh Castle), second husband of Janet Douglas, Lady Glamis
- Sir John Campbell of Calder (d.1546) ancestor of the Earls Cawdor
- Donald Campbell the Abbot of Coupar Angus
- Margaret Campbell, who married John Erskine, 5th Lord Erskine
- Isabel Campbell, married Gilbert Kennedy, 2nd Earl of Cassilis
- Janet Campbell, married John Stewart, 2nd Earl of Atholl
- Jean Campbell, married Sir John Lamont of that ilk, son Duncan Lamont
- Catherine Campbell, married Lachlan Cattanach Maclean, 11th Chief of Duart, secondly to Archibald Campbell of Auchinbreck
- Marion Campbell, married Sir Robert Menzies of that ilk
- Elen Campbell, married Sir Gavin Kennedy of Blairquhan
- Mary Campbell, married James Stewart, 4th Earl of Bute

Peerage of Scotland
Preceded by Colin Campbell	Earl of Argyll; 1493–1513	Succeeded by Colin Campbell
