= Colin Campbell, 1st Earl of Argyll =

Scottish nobleman (c. 1433 – 1493)

Colin Campbell
- Earl of Argyll
- Arms of Colin Campbell, 1st Earl of Argyll and Lord of Lorne (from c.1470)
- Tenure: 1457 – 10 May 1493
- Predecessor: Duncan Campbell, 1st Lord Campbell
- Successor: Archibald Campbell, 2nd Earl of Argyll
- Other titles: Lord Lorne; 2nd Lord Campbell
- Born: ca. 1433
- Died: 10 May 1493
- Buried: Kilmun Parish Church, Cowal, Scotland.
- Residence: Castle Campbell
- Noble family: Campbell
- Spouse: Isabel Stewart
- Issue: Archibald Campbell, 2nd Earl of Argyll; Hon. Thomas Campbell; Margaret Campbell, Lady Seton; Isabel Campbell-Drummond; Helen Campbell, Countess of Eglinton; Elizabeth Campbell, Lady Oliphant; Mary Campbell-MacDonald; Agnes Campbell; Catharine Campbell-MacLeod
- Parents: Archibald Campbell, Master of Campbell; Elizabeth Somerville

Colin Campbell, 1st Earl of Argyll (c. 1433 – 10 May 1493) was a medieval Scottish nobleman, peer, and politician. He was the son of Archibald Campbell, Master of Campbell and Elizabeth Somerville, daughter of John Somerville, 3rd Lord Somerville. He had the sobriquet Colin Mulle, Bold Earl Colin.

== Biography ==
Colin Campbell's father, Archibald Campbell Master of Campbell, died in 1440 and young Colin became the heir of his grandfather Duncan Campbell, 1st Lord Campbell. When his grandfather died in 1453, Colin succeeded him to become 2nd Lord Campbell. Colin was still a minor and was placed in the custody of his uncle, Colin Campbell, 1st of Glenorchy. In 1457, he was created Earl of Argyll by King James II of Scotland, who was grateful for the loyalty of his father during the troubles early in his reign. In 1460, Campbell had a commission as Bailie of Cowal.

His uncle Colin arranged his marriage with Isabella Stewart, daughter and co-heiress of John Stewart, Lord Lorne (d.1463). Through this marriage, he received Castle Gloom (he would change the name of the castle to "Castle Campbell" in February 1490), and the neighboring estate in the parish of Dollar in Clackmannanshire. Castle Campbell then became the primary seat of the Earls and Dukes of Argyll for the next two centuries.

The exact date of the marriage is unknown, but in 1460, shortly after the boy-king, James III of Scotland, came to the throne, Campbell was called upon to intervene in a feud in his wife's family. Allan MacDougall (called Allan of Lorne of the Wood), desiring to hold the estates belonging to his elder brother, John Ker of Lorne, seized his brother and imprisoned him in a dungeon on the island of Kerrera, with the intention of starving him to death. Campbell appeared with a fleet of war galleys and completely defeated MacDougall, burning his fleet, killing most of his men, and restoring the elder brother to his rightful inheritance.

=== Servant of James III ===
Colin Campbell was often sent on diplomatic missions, the first in 1463, when King James III sent him to negotiate a truce with King Edward IV of England. One of the main terms was that neither king would support the enemies of the other.

In 1464, Campbell was made master of the King's household. In 1465, he was appointed Lord Justiciary of Scotland, south of the Firth of Forth, a position he held in conjunction with Robert Boyd, 1st Lord Boyd, until Boyd fell out with the King and fled to England later in 1469, at which time, Campbell held the position alone. In 1466, he founded a chapel dedicated to St. Ninian at Dunure in Ayrshire.

As a result of his marriage with Isabel Stewart, Campbell acquired the title Lord Lorne in 1469, which had previously been held by his wife's uncle, Walter Stewart. In exchange for this title, Campbell gave Stewart other lands, and Stewart received the title Lord Innermeath. Having received the title Lord Lorne, Campbell took the symbol of the galley from the Lorne heraldry as part of his Achievement. In the event that he might never have a male heir, he entailed the lordship of Lorne to his uncle Colin; if his uncle were to die, to his other uncle, Duncan Campbell; then to Colin Campbell of Arduquholm and to the heirs male of his body, which failing, then to his brothers, Archibald and Robert. In 1471, he received the heritable offices of Justiciary and Sheriff of Lorne.

On 15 January 1472, King James III granted Dunoon Castle to Campbell and his heirs, with the power to appoint constables, porters, jailers, watermen, and other necessary offices. At the same time, he granted him the lands of Borland. On 20 February 1473, Campbell was made Justiciar, Chamberlain, Sheriff, and Bailie within the King's lordship of Cowal. Then on 8 May 1474, he received a charter to erect his town of Inverary into a burgh of barony.

In 1474, Campbell was again sent as a commissioner to treat with King Edward IV, regarding breaches of the truce. In the resulting pact, which was to endure until July 1483, a marriage was arranged between Prince James Stewart of Scotland (King James III's son) and Princess Cecily of England (King Edward IV's daughter), a match which did not come to pass due to continued hostilities between the two nations.

In 1475, when King James III was trying to subjugate John of Islay, Earl of Ross, Campbell was given a commission of lieutenancy to execute the forfeiture of the Earl of Ross' lands. In 1479, he was confirmed in the offices of Lieutenant and Commissary of Argyll, which had been held by his ancestors, Gillespic and Colin Campbell, since 1382.

Further favors came to the Earl of Argyll in 1480, when the King granted him 160 marklands of the lordship of Knapdale, including the keeping of Castle Sween, for one silver penny in blench farm, i.e., nominal rent. This property had formerly belonged to the Earl of Ross. Early in 1483, King James III appointed Campbell as Lord High Chancellor of Scotland and awarded him the lands of Pinkerton in the barony of Dunbar, probably for Campbell's loyalty to the King during the rebellion of Archibald Douglas, Earl of Angus, which had led to the murder of some of King's favorites, after the confrontation at Lauder in 1482. These lands had previously been held by the King's brother, Prince Alexander Stewart, Duke of Albany, who was in league with the Earl of Angus.

In 1484, Campbell was active in diplomatic campaigns. In July, he was sent as a commissioner to Paris to renew the "ancient league" between France and Scotland, a mission completed on 9 July. Then on 21 September, once King James III had gotten the upper hand against the rebels, he was part of the delegation who met with King Richard III of England at Nottingham to conclude peace, a treaty which was to run until September 1487. He was also appointed to periodically meet with the English at Berwick to determine whether or not the stipulations in the treaty were being followed. To strengthen the resolve of the parties and to keep the truce, a second marriage was arranged, between Prince James Stewart and Lady Ann de la Pole (1476–1495), daughter of John de la Pole, 2nd Duke of Suffolk, and a niece of King Richard III. This second marriage negotiation collapsed as a result of King Richard's defeat at the Battle of Bosworth in 1485.

=== Rebellion against James III ===
Campbell threw in with the rebels, after Parliament had strengthened King James's hand against the rebellious nobles in October 1487. At about this time, the King forced Campbell out of the chancellorship, in favor of William Elphinstone, Bishop of Aberdeen. In 1488, Campbell was not present at the Battle of Sauchieburn on 11 June, or in the days following, because he was in England on an embassy to King Henry VII of England, having been sent there on behalf of Prince James Stewart and the rebels to seek English help against King James III.

After Prince James was crowned as "James IV", he restored Campbell to the position of High Chancellor. Furthermore, the new king gave him the lands of Rosneath in Dunbartonshire on 9 January 1490, which remained in the Campbell family until 1939. Campbell continued in favor with King James IV, and on 21 December 1491, he was one of the conservators of the truce between England and Scotland, which was extended to 1496. One author has claimed that, one reason James III of Scotland has long had a sinister reputation is that "such accounts as we have of him are written by the partisans of his unruly nobles, such as the Earls of Argyll, Lennox, and Angus".

Colin Campbell, 1st Earl of Argyll, died in 1493, and was buried at Kilmun Parish Church on Cowal Peninsula. He was succeeded by his eldest son, Archibald Campbell.

== Family ==
By his wife, Isabel Stewart, Campbell had two sons and seven daughters:

- Archibald Campbell, 2nd Earl of Argyll
- Thomas Campbell, ancestor of the Campbells of Lundie in Forfarshire.
- Margaret Campbell, married to George Seton, Lord Seton.
- Isabel Campbell, married to William Drummond, Master of Drummond, grandmother of David Drummond, 2nd Lord Drummond of Cargill, ancestor of the Earls of Perth.
- Helen Campbell, married to Hugh Montgomerie, 1st Earl of Eglinton.
- Elizabeth Campbell, married to John Oliphant, 2nd Lord Oliphant.
- Mary Campbell, married to Aonghas MacDonald, natural son and heir of John of Islay, Earl of Ross.
- Agnes Campbell, said to have been married to Alexander Mackenzie of Kintail, though some state this is disproved.
- Catharine Campbell, married first Lachlan Og Maclean and second Torquil MacLeod of Clan MacLeod of Lewis.

Peerage of Scotland
New creation	Earl of Argyll; 1457–1493	Succeeded by Archibald Campbell
Preceded by Duncan Campbell	Lord Campbell; 1453–1493	Succeeded by Archibald Campbell
New creation	Lord Lorne; 1470–1493	Succeeded by Archibald Campbell
Political offices
Preceded by John Laing	Lord Chancellor of Scotland; 1483–1488	Succeeded by William Elphinstone
Preceded by William Elphinstone	Lord Chancellor of Scotland; 1488–1492	Succeeded by Archibald Douglas
