= John Campbell, 5th Duke of Argyll =

British Army officer and politician (1723–1806)

Field Marshal His Grace The Duke of Argyll
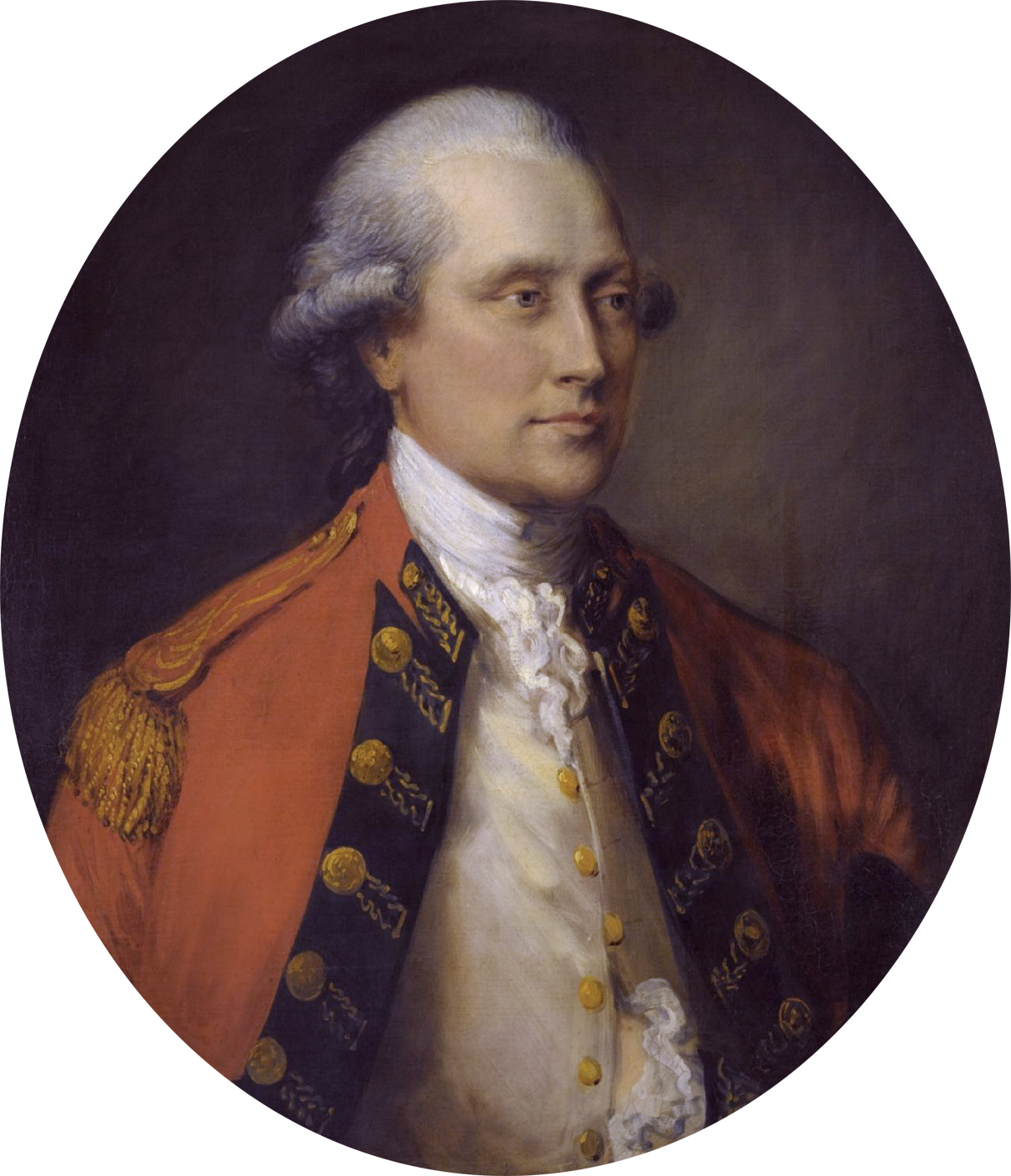
- Portrait by Thomas Gainsborough
- Predecessor: John Campbell, 4th Duke of Argyll
- Successor: George Campbell, 6th Duke of Argyll
- Born: June 1723
- Died: 24 May 1806 (aged 82)
- Buried: Argyll Mausoleum
- Wars and battles: Jacobite rising of 1745
- Spouse: Elizabeth Gunning (m. 1759; died 1790)
- Issue: Lady Augusta Campbell; George John Campbell, Earl of Campbell; George Campbell, 6th Duke of Argyll; Lady Charlotte Campbell; John Campbell, 7th Duke of Argyll
- Parents: John Campbell, 4th Duke of Argyll; Mary Bellenden

Field Marshal John Campbell, 5th Duke of Argyll (June 1723 – 24 May 1806), styled Marquess of Lorne from 1761 to 1770, was a British Army officer and politician. After serving as a junior officer in Flanders during the War of the Austrian Succession, he was given command of a regiment and was redeployed to Scotland where he opposed the Jacobites at Loch Fyne at an early stage of the Jacobite Rebellion and went on to fight against them at the Battle of Falkirk Muir and then at the Battle of Culloden. He later became adjutant-general in Ireland and spent some 20 years as a Member of Parliament before retiring to Inveraray Castle.

== Military career ==
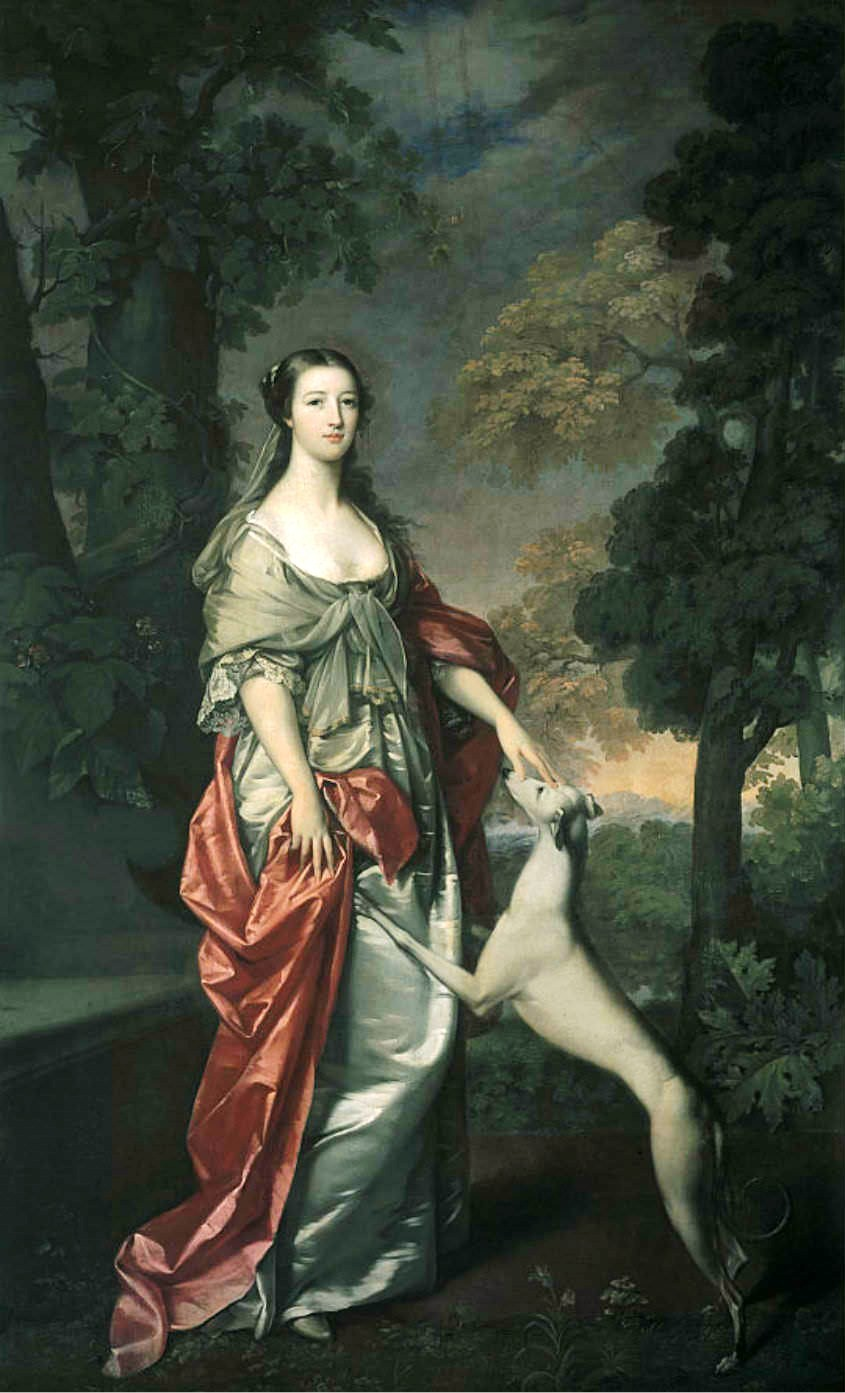
Portrait of Elizabeth Gunning by Gavin Hamilton, which was commissioned by James Hamilton, 6th Duke of Hamilton

Born the son of John Campbell, 4th Duke of Argyll and Mary Campbell (née Bellenden), the daughter of John Bellenden, 2nd Lord Bellenden of Broughton, Campbell was educated at a private school in London and commissioned as second lieutenant in the 21st Royal Scots Fusiliers in 1739. He was promoted to captain in 1741 and major in 1743. He became Member of Parliament for Glasgow Burghs in March 1744 but was immediately deployed to Flanders to serve in the War of the Austrian Succession.

Campbell became lieutenant colonel commanding the 30th Regiment of Foot early in 1745 and was redeployed to Scotland where he opposed the Jacobites at Loch Fyne in November 1745 at an early stage of the Jacobite Rebellion. He went on to see action under Lieutenant General Henry Hawley at the Battle of Falkirk Muir where the British cavalry was completely routed in January 1746. He also served under the Duke of Cumberland at the Battle of Culloden where the Jacobites were finally defeated in April 1746. In 1749 Campbell transferred to the command of the 42nd Regiment of Foot who were serving in Ireland: he went on to become adjutant-general in Ireland in 1754. Promoted to colonel on 10 November 1755, he became colonel of the 54th Regiment of Foot in December 1755 and colonel of the 14th Dragoons in April 1757. He was promoted to major-general on 25 August 1759 and to lieutenant general on 19 January 1761. He took the courtesy title of Marquess of Lorne, and stood down from the House of Commons on his disqualification from representing a Scottish seat, when his father became 4th Duke of Argyll on 15 April 1761. He became Deputy Commander-in-Chief, Scotland in 1762 and was elected unopposed as Member of Parliament for Dover, an English seat, in January 1765. He became colonel of the 1st Regiment of Foot later that year.

Campbell stood down from the House of Commons again when, on the formation of the Chatham Ministry, he was created Baron Sundridge in the Peerage of the United Kingdom in November 1766. He was appointed Commander-in-Chief, Scotland in 1767, succeeded his father as 5th Duke of Argyll in November 1770 and was promoted to full general on 24 March 1778. He went on to be colonel of the 3rd Regiment of Footguards in May 1782 and, having been appointed Lord Lieutenant of Argyllshire on 6 May 1794, was promoted to field marshal on 30 July 1796. In retirement Campbell lived at Inveraray Castle and became an expert on agricultural improvement with a seat on the Board of Agriculture; he was also first president of the Highland and Agricultural Society. He died on 24 May 1806 and was buried at Kilmun Parish Church.

== Marriage and children ==
In 1759 Campbell married Elizabeth Gunning, widow of James Hamilton, 6th Duke of Hamilton and mother of James Hamilton, 7th Duke of Hamilton and Douglas Hamilton, 8th Duke of Hamilton. She was later created Baroness Hamilton of Hameldon in her own right. They had five children:

- Lady Augusta Campbell (born 31 March 1760, died 22 June 1831)
- George John Campbell, Earl of Campbell (born 17 February 1763, died 9 July 1764)
- George William Campbell, 6th Duke of Argyll (born 22 September 1768, died 22 October 1839)
- Lady Charlotte Susan Maria Campbell (born 28 January 1775, died 1 April 1861)
- John Douglas Edward Henry Campbell, 7th Duke of Argyll (born 21 December 1777, died 25 April 1847)

== Sources ==
- Heathcote, Tony (1999). The British Field Marshals, 1736–1997: A Biographical Dictionary. Barnsley: Leo Cooper. ISBN 0-85052-696-5.

Parliament of Great Britain
Preceded by Neil Buchanan	Member of Parliament for Glasgow Burghs; 1744–1761	Succeeded by Lord Frederick Campbell
Preceded by Sir Joseph Yorke; Edward Simpson	Member of Parliament for Dover; 1765–1766; With: Sir Joseph Yorke	Succeeded by Sir Joseph Yorke; John Bindley
Military offices
New regiment	Colonel of the 54th Regiment of Foot; 1755–1757	Succeeded by John Grey
Preceded by Louis Dejean	Colonel of the 14th Regiment of Dragoons; 1757–1765	Succeeded by Charles FitzRoy
Preceded by Sir Henry Erskine	Colonel of the 1st (Royal) Regiment of Foot; 1765–1782	Succeeded by Lord Adam Gordon
Preceded by The Earl of Loudoun	Colonel of the 3rd Regiment of Foot Guards; 1782–1806	Succeeded by The Duke of Gloucester
Honorary titles
New office	Lord Lieutenant of Argyllshire; 1794–1799	Succeeded by Marquess of Lorne
Peerage of Scotland
Preceded by John Campbell	Duke of Argyll; 1770–1806	Succeeded by George Campbell
Peerage of Great Britain
New creation	Baron Sundridge; 1766–1806	Succeeded by George Campbell
