= Fergusson baronets =

Baronetcy in the Baronetage of Nova Scotia

Arms: Azure a Buckle Argent between three Boar's Heads couped Or on a Dexter Canton Argent a Saltire Azure surmounted of an Inescutcheon Or charged with a Lion rampant within a Double Tressure flory counter-flory Gules; Crest: Upon a Chapeau Gules furred Ermine a Bee on a Thistle proper; Supporters: (on a Compartment embellished with Poplar Seedlings) Two Gryphons Or armed and beaked Gules (granted 1753 in recognition of the 2nd Baronet's legal prowess); Mottoes: 1 (over Crest): Dulcius Ex Asperis (All the sweeter for coming from bitterness); 2 (on Compartment): Ut Prosim Aliis (That I may be of use to others)

The Fergusson Baronetcy, of Kilkerran in the County of Ayr, is a title in the Baronetage of Nova Scotia. It was created on 30 November 1703 for the prominent advocate John Fergusson. The second Baronet represented Sutherland in the House of Commons and served as a Lord of Session under the judicial title Lord Kilkerran. The third Baronet, who with his brothers owned plantations and enslaved people in Jamaica and Tobago, sat as Member of Parliament for Ayrshire and Edinburgh. In 1796 he claimed the earldom of Glencairn. The House of Lords decided that he had successfully proved that he was heir-general to Alexander Cunningham, 10th Earl of Glencairn (died 1670), but that he had not proved his right to the earldom. The sixth Baronet was a Conservative politician and colonial governor and notably served as Governor of New Zealand from 1873 to 1874 and as Governor of Bombay from 1880 to 1885. The seventh Baronet was Governor-General of New Zealand between 1924 and 1930. The eighth Baronet was an author and historian and also served as Lord-Lieutenant of Ayrshire.

Several other members of the Fergusson family have also gained distinction. Sir James Andrew Fergusson (1872–1942), second son of the sixth Baronet, was an Admiral in the Royal Navy. Charles Dalrymple, second son of the fifth Baronet, was a Conservative politician. He assumed the surname of Dalrymple in lieu of Fergusson and was created a baronet in his own right in 1887 (see Dalrymple baronets). Bernard Fergusson, Baron Ballantrae, Governor-General of New Zealand from 1962 to 1967, was the youngest son of the seventh Baronet. His son is George Fergusson, British High Commissioner to New Zealand. Sir Alexander Fergusson, grandson of the seventh Baronet, was a Scottish parliamentarian and third Presiding Officer of the Scottish Parliament.

== Fergusson baronets, of Kilkerran (1703) ==
- Sir John Fergusson, 1st Baronet (died 1729)
- Sir James Fergusson, 2nd Baronet (1687–1759)
- Sir Adam Fergusson, 3rd Baronet (1733–1813)
- Sir James Fergusson, 4th Baronet (1765–1838)
- Sir Charles Dalrymple Fergusson, 5th Baronet (1800–1849)
- Sir James Fergusson, 6th Baronet (1832–1907)
- Sir Charles Fergusson, 7th Baronet (1865–1951)
- Sir James Fergusson, 8th Baronet (1904–1973)
- Sir Charles Fergusson, 9th Baronet (1931–2021)
- Sir Adam Fergusson, 10th Baronet (born 1962)

The heir apparent is the current holder's son, James Fergusson (born 1996).

== Fergusson (later Colyer-Fergusson) baronets, of Spitalhaugh (1866) ==
See Colyer-Fergusson baronets

== See also ==
- Fergusson (later Colyer-Fergusson) baronets, of Spitalhaugh (1866)
- Dalrymple baronets
- Earl of Glencairn
