= Evelyn =

Evelyn may refer to:

== People ==
- Evelyn (name), including a list of persons and fictional characters with the name

== Places ==
=== Australia ===
- Evelyn County, New South Wales, a cadastral division
- Electoral district of Evelyn, an electoral district in Victoria
- Evelyn, Queensland, a locality in the Tablelands Region

=== Canada ===
- Evelyn, Ontario

=== United Kingdom ===
- Evelyn (ward), London
- Evelyn Gardens, a garden square in London

=== United States ===
- Evelyn, Michigan
- Evelyn, Texas
- Evelyn, Wirt County, West Virginia
- Evelyn (VTA), former light rail train station in Mountain View, California

== Schools ==
- Evelyn College for Women, or Evelyn College, the former women's college of Princeton University
- Evelyn High School, in Bulawayo, Zimbabwe

== Entertainment ==
- Evelyn (2002 film), a film starring Sophie Vavasseur and Pierce Brosnan
- Evelyn (2018 film), a documentary
- Evelyn: The Cutest Evil Dead Girl, 2002 short film and black comedy directed by Brad Peyton
- Evelyn (play), a 1969 radio play by Rhys Adrian
- Evelyn (EP), an EP by The Mess Hall
- "Evelyn", song by De Rosa 2006
- "Evelyn", a song by Volbeat from their album Beyond Hell/Above Heaven
- "Evilyn", a song by Entombed from their album Clandestine
- Evelyn, a minor character in Meta Runner
- Evelyn Couch, a character in the 1991 American comedy-drama movie Fried Green Tomatoes
- Evelyn Sader, a character in the novel A World Without Princes, by Soman Chainani
- Evelyn Bluedhorn Stratton, a character in Silver Spoons

== Other ==
- 503 Evelyn, a main belt asteroid
- Hurricane Evelyn, fifth hurricane of the 1977 Atlantic hurricane season
- SS Eveleen, a British coaster in service under this name 1920–1943 and 1946–1957
