= Evelynn =

Evelynn may refer to:

- Evelynn, Agony's Embrace, a playable champion character in the video game League of Legends and its associated virtual band K/DA
- Evelynn (band), an American band of the 1990s and 2000s

== People with the name ==
- Evelynn M. Hammonds (born 1950), American feminist scholar
- Evlynn Smith (birth name Evelynn Anne Smith; 1962–2003), Scottish artist
- Ewelina Lisowska (born 1991), Polish singer who uses the stage name Evelynn Nurth

== See also ==
- Evelyn (disambiguation)
- Evelyn (name)
