= Sir Charles Fergusson, 7th Baronet =

British Army general and Governor General of New Zealand

General The Right Honourable Sir Charles Fergusson GCB Bt GCMG DSO MVO
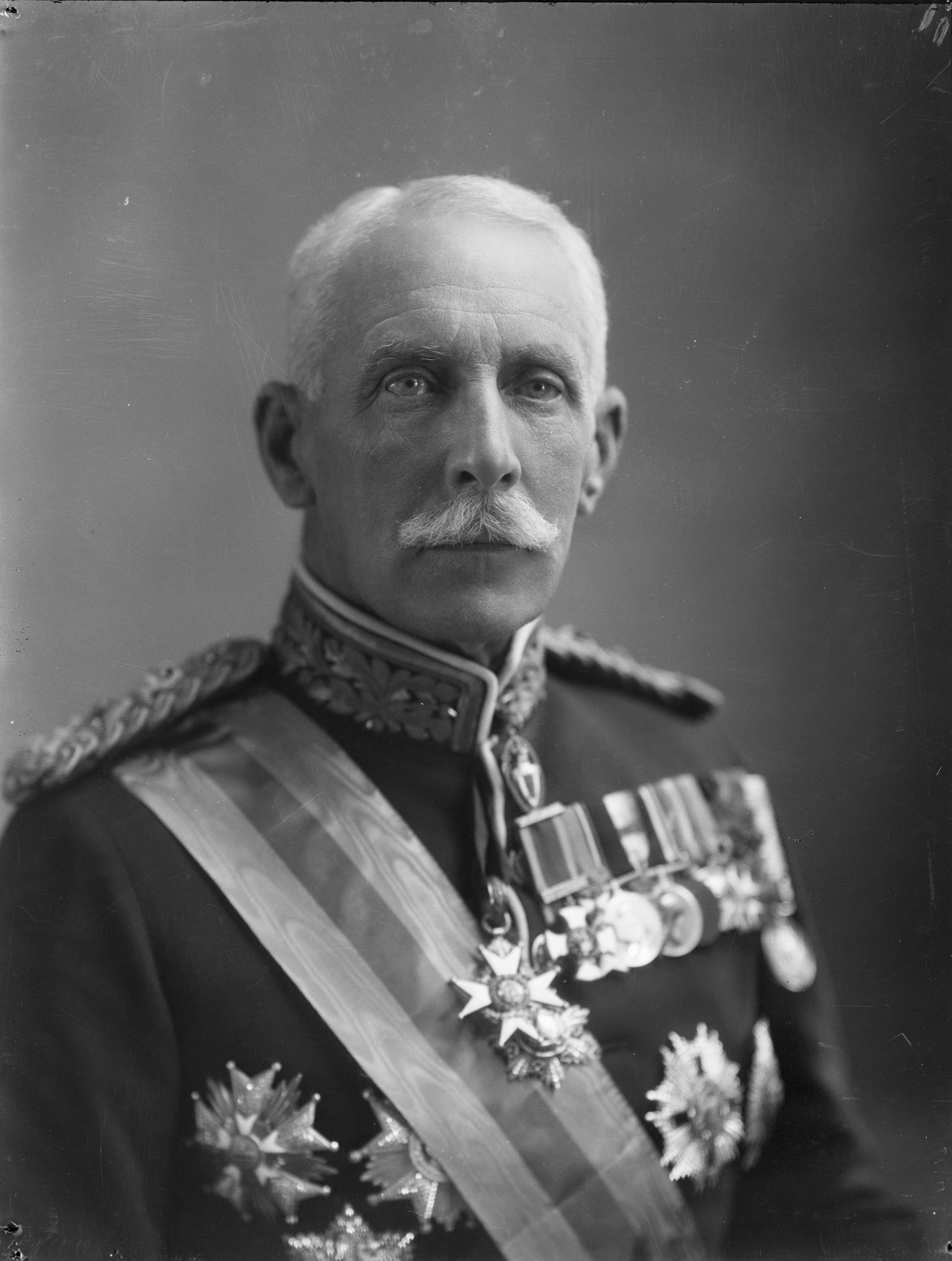
- Fergusson, c. 1926

3rd Governor-General of New Zealand
- In office 13 December 1924 – 8 February 1930
- Monarch: George V
- Prime Minister: William Massey; Francis Bell; Gordon Coates; Joseph Ward
- Preceded by: The Viscount Jellicoe
- Succeeded by: The Lord Bledisloe

Personal details
- Born: 17 January 1865 London, England
- Died: 20 February 1951 (aged 86) Maybole, Ayrshire, Scotland
- Spouse: Alice Mary Boyle
- Relations: Sir James Fergusson, 6th Baronet (father)
- Children: Sir James Fergusson, 8th Baronet; Bernard Fergusson, Baron Ballantrae

Military service
- Allegiance: United Kingdom
- Branch/service: British Army
- Years of service: 1883–1922
- Rank: General
- Unit: Grenadier Guards
- Commands: XVII Corps; II Corps; 9th (Scottish) Division; 5th Division; 3rd Battalion, Grenadier Guards; Omdurman District; 15th Sudanese Regiment
- Battles/wars: Mahdist War; First World War
- Awards: Knight Grand Cross of the Order of the Bath; Knight Grand Cross of the Order of St Michael and St George; Distinguished Service Order; Member of the Royal Victorian Order; Mentioned in dispatches

Sir Charles Fergusson, 7th Baronet, GCB, GCMG, DSO, MVO (17 January 1865 – 20 February 1951) was a British Army general who was the third governor-general of New Zealand from 1924 to 1930. Before that, he served as a distinguished division and later corps commander almost entirely on the Western Front during the First World War, from 1914 to 1918.

== Early life and military career ==
Fergusson was the son of Sir James Fergusson, 6th Baronet, the 6th Governor of New Zealand and Lady Edith Christian Ramsay, daughter of James Broun-Ramsay, 1st Marquess of Dalhousie. He was educated at Eton College and the Royal Military College at Sandhurst, before being commissioned as a subaltern, with the rank of lieutenant, into the Grenadier Guards in November 1883.

On 11 April 1890 he was appointed as an adjutant. Promoted to captain in October 1895, and major in November 1898, he served in the Sudan from 1896 to 1898, becoming commanding officer (CO) of the 15th Sudanese Regiment in 1899 and commander of the Omdurman District in 1900. He was awarded the Distinguished Service Order for his service in Sudan in 1898, and was awarded the Order of the Medjidieh (third class) in 1899.

He was made adjutant general of the Egyptian Army in early 1901 and commanding officer (CO) of the 3rd Battalion, Grenadier Guards in 1904 and appointed a Member (4th class) (MVO) of the Royal Victorian Order in 1906 before being placed on half-pay in July 1907. He was promoted to substantive colonel in October, and was promoted to the temporary rank of brigadier general to be brigadier general, general staff (BGGS) of Irish Command, in which role he succeeded Colonel Frederick Hammersley. After being promoted to major-general in September 1908, at the very young age (in peacetime) of just 43, he was appointed an inspector of infantry in April 1909. He was appointed a deputy lieutenant of the County of Ayr in 1909.

He was appointed a Companion in the Military Division of the Order of the Bath in the 1911 Coronation Honours. In February 1913 he succeeded Major General William Pitcairn Campbell as general officer commanding (GOC) of the 5th Division, then stationed in Ireland. In this capacity he played a key role during the Curragh incident the following year, ensuring his officers obeyed orders.

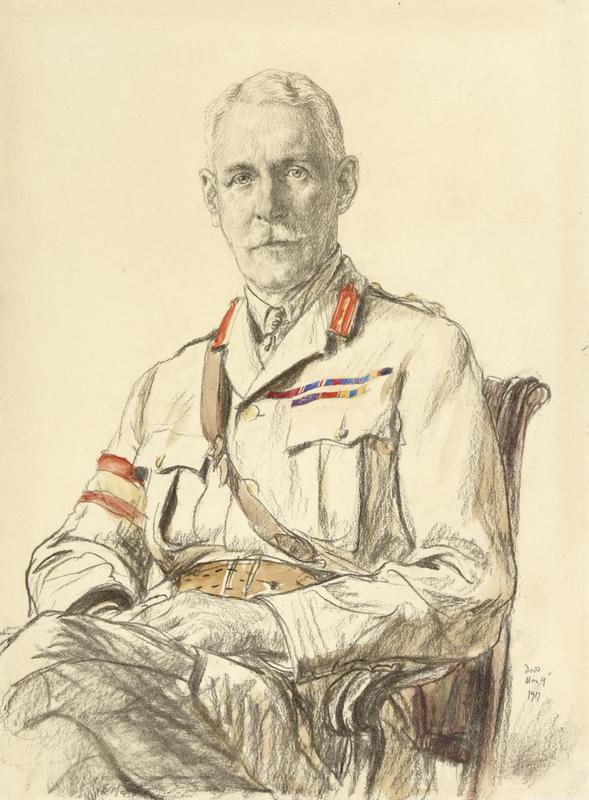
Portrait of Fergusson in uniform, seated with his hands folded in his lap.

== First World War ==
=== Division commander ===
He took the 5th Division to France in August 1914 shortly after the outbreak of the First World War. Following the sudden death of Lieutenant General Sir James Grierson on 17 August, Fergusson briefly assumed temporary command of II Corps, the 5th Division's parent formation, as the senior officer on the spot. He held this position until the arrival of General Sir Horace Smith-Dorrien on 21 August, with Fergusson reverting to the command of the 5th Division.

He remained in command of the division during all of its early battles on the Western Front, including at the Battle of Mons and the subsequent retreat, notably at the Battle of Le Cateau.

He then led his division in the Battle of the Marne, soon after followed by the Battle of the Aisne which saw both the beginning of trench warfare being used by both the Allies and the Germany. In October Fergusson and his division became involved in the Battle of La Bassée as part of the Race to the Sea.

Despite this, he was suddenly removed from his command on 18 October, "ostensibly because he was being promoted to Lieutenant-General", with Major General Thomas Morland taking over the 5th Division. The real reason, however, appears to be that Field Marshal Sir John French, commander-in-chief (C-in-C) of the British Expeditionary Force (BEF) on the Western Front, wanted Fergusson's removal, not believing that the latter had it in him to successfully command a division, despite the fact that Fergusson had been doing so for the past two months.

Fergusson, promoted to lieutenant general, then returned to the United Kingdom and briefly took command of the 9th (Scottish) Division, the most senior of the newly created formations of Kitchener's Army, from October to December 1914.

=== Corps commander ===
On 2 January 1915, Fergusson was appointed GOC of II Corps on the Western Front, succeeding General Sir Horace Smith-Dorrien, who went on to command the newly formed Second Army. During this period, he was noted for a strict command style and frequent personal inspections of frontline positions.

In February he was promoted to Knight Commander of the Order of the Bath (KCB), "in connection with Operations in the Field".

Following in the aftermath of the Battle of Loos in September–October 1915, Fergusson expressed dissatisfaction with the performance of the 21st Division, a New Army formation in battle for the first time, which led to the relief of its GOC, Major General George Forestier-Walker.

He was appointed a Commander of the Order of Leopold in February 1916. In May, Fergusson took command of the newly formed XVII Corps. He led the corps during the Battle of Arras in 1917 and remained in command during the German spring offensives from March through July 1918. He continued to lead the corps throughout the Hundred Days Offensive later that year, until the Armistice with Germany in November, which ended the war.

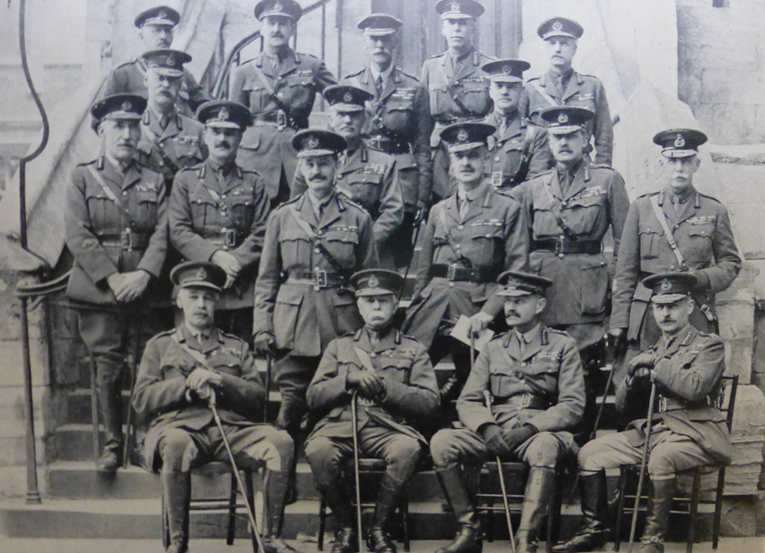
Eighteen Old Etonian generals revisit Eton, May 1919. Lieutenant General Fergusson stands in the middle row, first on the right.

== Between the wars ==
After the war Fergusson, promoted to the rank of full general in July 1921, was a military governor of Cologne before he retired from the army in 1922.

== Governor-General of New Zealand ==
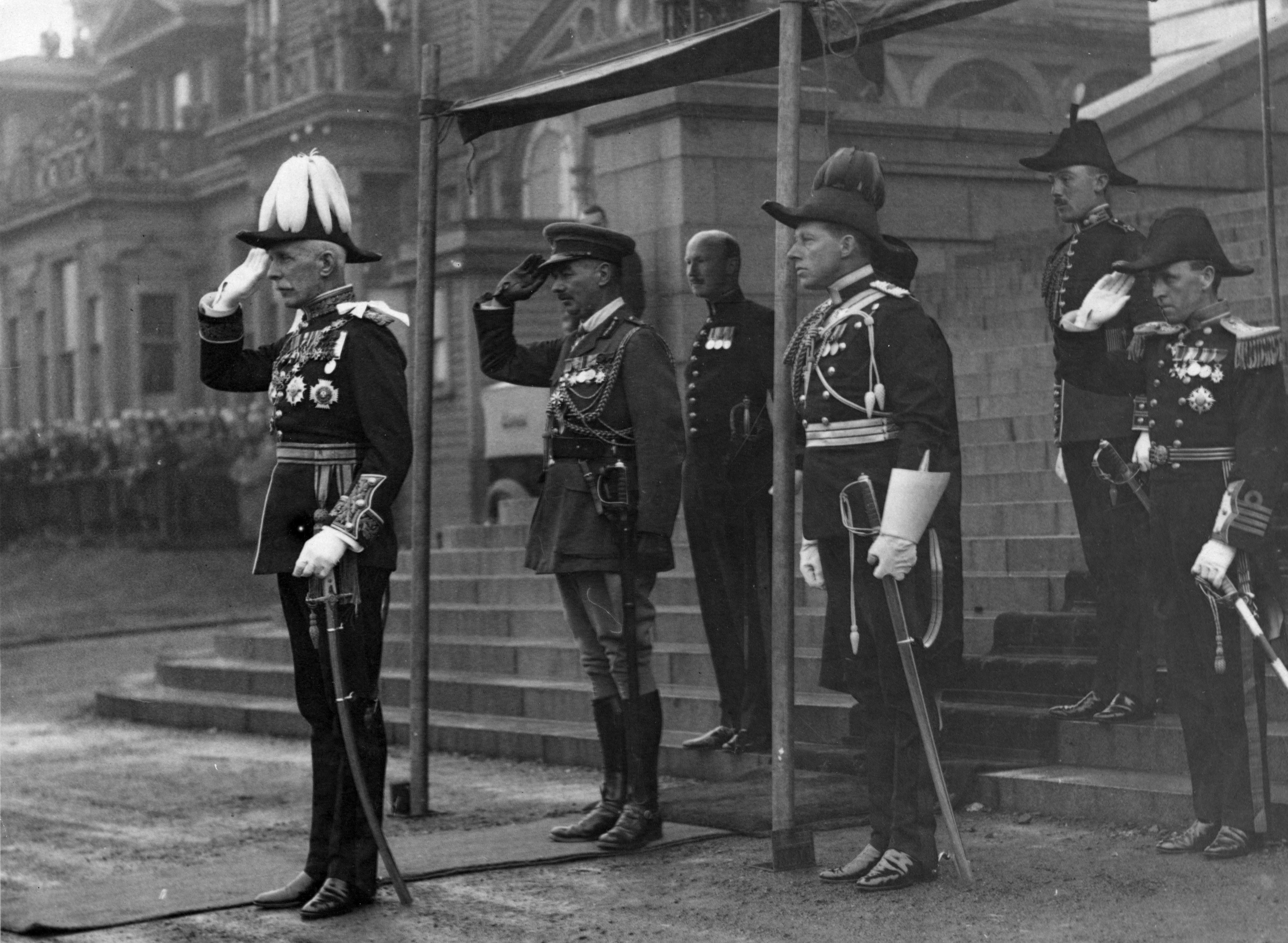
Sir Charles Fergusson and others at the 1925 opening of Parliament.

A year after an unsuccessful attempt to enter parliament through the South Ayrshire constituency in the 1923 general election, Fergusson was appointed Governor-General of New Zealand and served until 1930. His father, Sir James Fergusson, had served as a Governor of New Zealand, and his son Lord Ballantrae was the tenth and last British-appointed governor-general.

On 20 June 1929 Fergusson was involved in a railway accident, following the 1929 Murchison earthquake. Attached to the rear of a train leaving the National Dairy Show at Palmerston North with 200 passengers on board, the Viceregal carriage contained the Governor-General and his wife and other members of the Viceregal party. The train hit a slip between Paekākāriki and Pukerua Bay, with the locomotive falling down a steep bank and injuring the driver. The first three carriages of the train also left the rails, but the Viceregal carriage remained on the tracks, and Fergusson and his party suffered only minor cuts and bruises.

== Marriage and family ==
Fergusson married Lady Alice Mary Boyle on 18 July 1901. She was a daughter of David Boyle, 7th Earl of Glasgow. They had five children:

- Helen Dorothea Fergusson (15 October 1902 – ?) married 1925 Major Leonard Proby Haviland
- Sir James Fergusson, 8th Baronet (18 September 1904 – 25 October 1973)
- The Reverend Simon Charles David Fergusson (5 June 1907 – 1982). He married Auriole Kathleen Hughes-Onslow, maternal granddaughter of Arthur Crofton, 4th Baron Crofton. They had two sons and two daughters, one of whom was Scottish MSP Alex Fergusson.
- Brigadier Bernard Edward Fergusson, Baron Ballantrae (6 May 1911 – 28 November 1980)
- Charles Fergusson (16 January 1917 – 22 January 1917)

== Freemasonry ==
Fergusson was a Freemason. During his term as governor-general, he was also Grand Master of the Grand Lodge of New Zealand.

Lodge Empire Fergusson, No 225, still meets in Wellington.

== Later life ==
After his term in New Zealand, Fergusson became chairman of the West Indies Closer Union Commission and was Lord Lieutenant of Ayrshire from 1937 until his death on 20 February 1951.

== Arms ==
Coat of arms of Sir Charles Fergusson, 7th Baronet
Notes The arms of Charles Fergusson consist of: Crest A bee on a thistle Proper. Escutcheon Quarterly: 1st grandquarter Azure, a buckle Argent between three boars' heads couped Or armed and langued gules (Fergusson of Kilkerran) 2nd grandquarter, counterquartered; 1st and 4th Argent, an eagle displayed Sable beaked and membered Gules (Ramsay); 2nd and 3rd Gules, a chevron between three fleurs de lis Or (Broun of Colston): 3rd grandquarter, counterquartered; 1st and 4th Or, a lion rampant couped at all joints Gules within a double tressure flory counter flory Azure (Maitland); 2nd and 3rd Argent, a shakefork Sable (Cunningham of Glencairn): 4th grandquarter Or, on a saltire Azure nine lozenges of the first, on a bordure of the second eight mullets and as many boars' heads erased alternately Argent (Dalrymple of New Hailes). Motto Dulcius ex asperis (All the sweeter for having undergone bitterness); on compartment: Ut prosim aliis (May I profit others)

Military offices
Preceded by William Campbell	GOC 5th Division; 1913–1914	Succeeded by Thomas Morland
Preceded by Colin Mackenzie	GOC 9th (Scottish) Division; October–December 1914	Succeeded by Herman Landon
Preceded by Horace Smith-Dorrien	GOC II Corps; 1915–1916	Succeeded by Claud Jacob
Preceded by Julian Byng	GOC XVII Corps; 1916–1918	Post disbanded
Government offices
Preceded by The Viscount Jellicoe	Governor-General of New Zealand; 1924–1930	Succeeded by The Viscount Bledisloe
Honorary titles
Preceded by The Marquess of Ailsa	Lord Lieutenant of Ayrshire; 1937–1951	Succeeded by Sir Geoffrey Hughes-Onslow
Baronetage of Nova Scotia
Preceded by James Fergusson	Baronet (of Kilkerran); 1907–1951	Succeeded by James Fergusson
