= Collier Twentyman Smithers =

English painter

Collier Twentyman Smithers (1867 – 7 December 1943) was a portrait, figure and rustic painter. He was born in Buenos Aires, the son of Arthur Edward Smithers, a banker.

In 1892 Smithers was living at 5 Primrose Hill Studios off Fitzroy Road, north London. This may account for his stylistic similarity to John William Waterhouse, who also lived at Primrose Hill Studios.

From 1892 to 1936 he exhibited at the Royal Academy; the Royal Society of British Artists, Birmingham; Walker Art Gallery, Liverpool; Manchester City Art Gallery; New Gallery; and the Royal Hibernian Academy and his work received popular reviews. He was a Freeman of the City of London, being admitted to the Worshipful Company of Turners in 1893.

He died in 1943 at 36 Roland Gardens, London.

== Paintings ==
- R. Norman Shaw, Esq., R.A.—1892
- Surg.-Lieut. Leopold Hudson, Duke of Cambridge's Hussars—1894
- A Race with Mermaids and Tritons—1895
- The Theft of the Princess's Swan Skin—1896
- Angel of Fortune—1901
- Walking up grouse (photogravure)—1904
- Portrait of Joan Helen Furneaux Dawson—1913
- The princess permits—1915
- Portrait of Adam Alexander Dawson—1918
