= Roland Gardens, London =

Street in South Kensington, London

Coordinates: 51°29′24.13″N 0°10′50″W

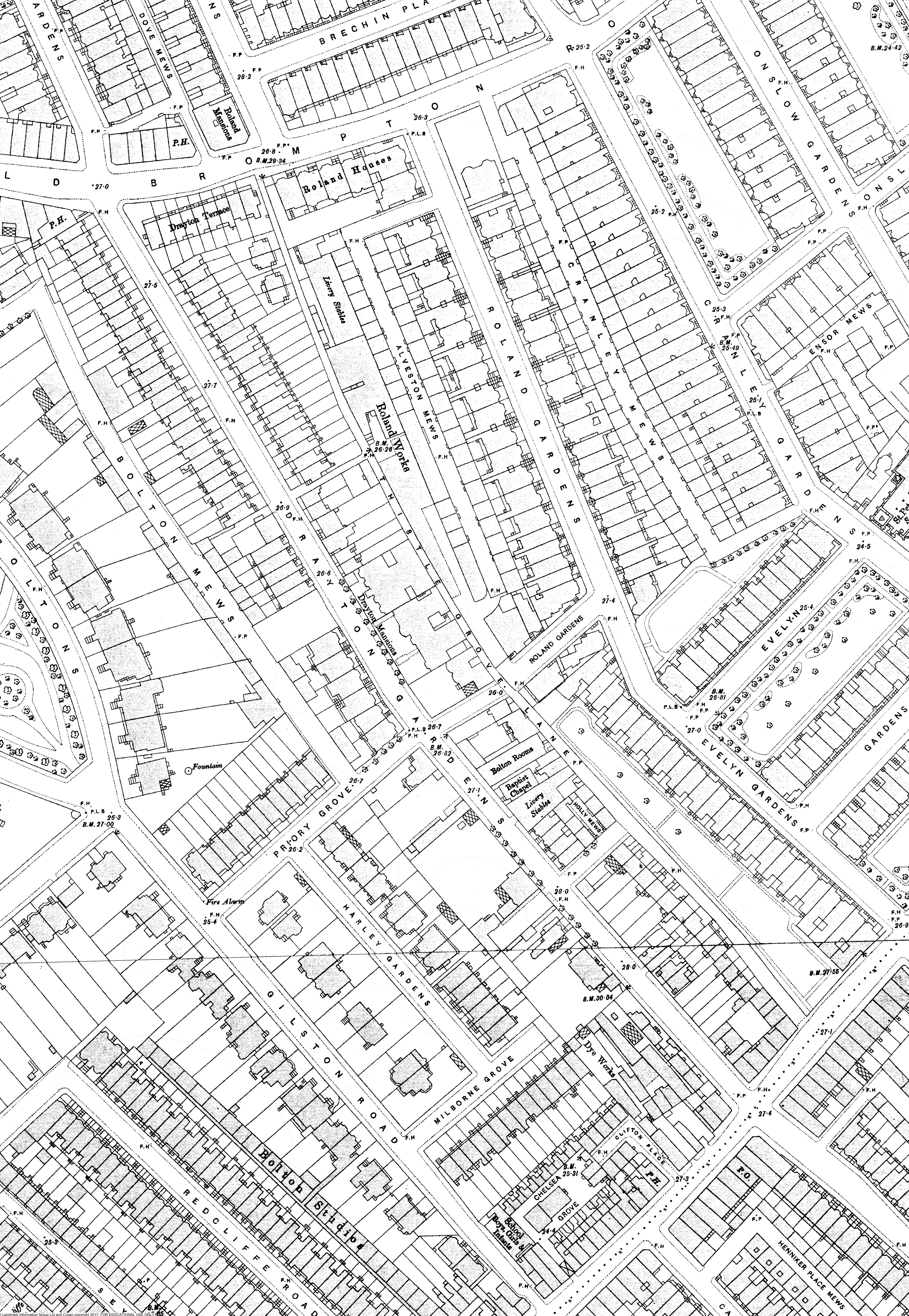
Roland Gardens on an 1890s Ordnance Survey map, not long after it was built. (Running south from Old Brompton Road at the top)

Roland Gardens is a street in South Kensington, London SW7. It runs north to south from Old Brompton Road to Drayton Gardens at its southern end, where it becomes Evelyn Gardens.

== History ==
Building on the street was started in 1870 by Charles Aldin and his sons Charles and William, with more than half completed by 1874, and the rest by 1893.

== Notable buildings and residents ==
- Blakes Hotel, is at no. 33, and is considered to be one of the world's first boutique hotels.
- The National Laboratory of Psychical Research was once at no. 13.
- The artist Collier Twentyman Smithers died in 1943 at no. 36.
- Blanche Dugdale, author and Zionist and her husband Edgar Dugdale, a Lloyd's of London underwriter, lived at no. 1.
- Douglas Green, Australian artist, and his wife Helen lived at 21 in 1951.
- Stanley Bate, composer, lived in a Roland Gardens flat from 1949 until his death in 1959.
