= Kilkerran House =

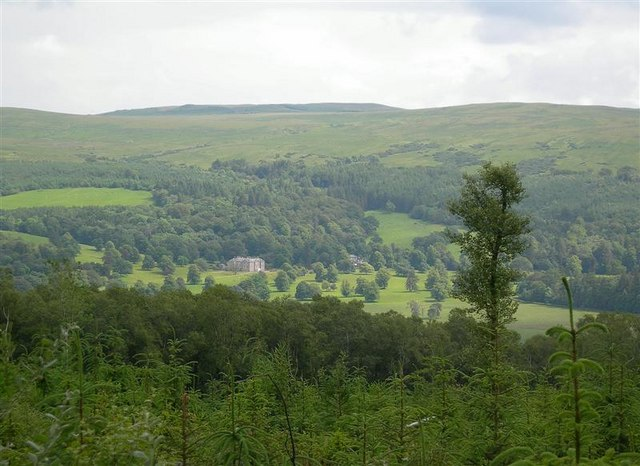
- Looking towards Kilkerran House
- Interactive map of the Kilkerran House area

General information
- Type: House
- Location: near Maybole, Ayrshire, Scotland
- Coordinates: 55°17′32″N 4°40′18″W
- Completed: c. 1700

Technical details
- Structural system: Brick, stone

Listed Building – Category A
- Reference no.: LB1114

Inventory of Gardens and Designed Landscapes in Scotland
- Official name: Kilkerran
- Designated: 30 June 1987
- Reference no.: GDL00238

Kilkerran House is an 18th-century private house near Maybole, Ayrshire, Scotland. It is a category A listed building set within grounds included in the Inventory of Gardens and Designed Landscapes in Scotland. The name Kilkerran relates Campbeltown Loch, originally referred to as 'Kinlochkilkerran' (an anglicization of the Gaelic, which means "head of the loch by the kirk (Chille) of Ciarán").

== Location ==
Kilkerran lies in the valley of the Water of Girvan about 4.5 miles (7 km) south of Maybole and 2 miles (3 km) north-east of Dailly.

== History ==
It has been home to the Fergusson family since Fergus Fergusson obtained a charter from Robert the Bruce in the early 1300s, confirming that the lands at Kilkerran were his.

A tower house stood on the site of the present house by the 14th century.

The core of the house dates back to about 1700, and has been expanded in 1818 by James Gillespie Graham (including William Adam fireplaces), a billiards room by David Bryce in 1855, and stable offices by Brown and Wardrop in 1873. In 1956, the house was redecorated under the supervision of the architect Schomberg Scott.

The English Zionist and biographer Blanche Dugdale, mother-in-law of the owner, Sir James Fergusson, 8th Baronet, died at Kilkerran House on 16 May 1948. His son, Sir Charles Fergusson, 9th Baronet, is the current resident.
