= Sir William Fergusson, 1st Baronet =

Scottish surgeon (1808–1877)

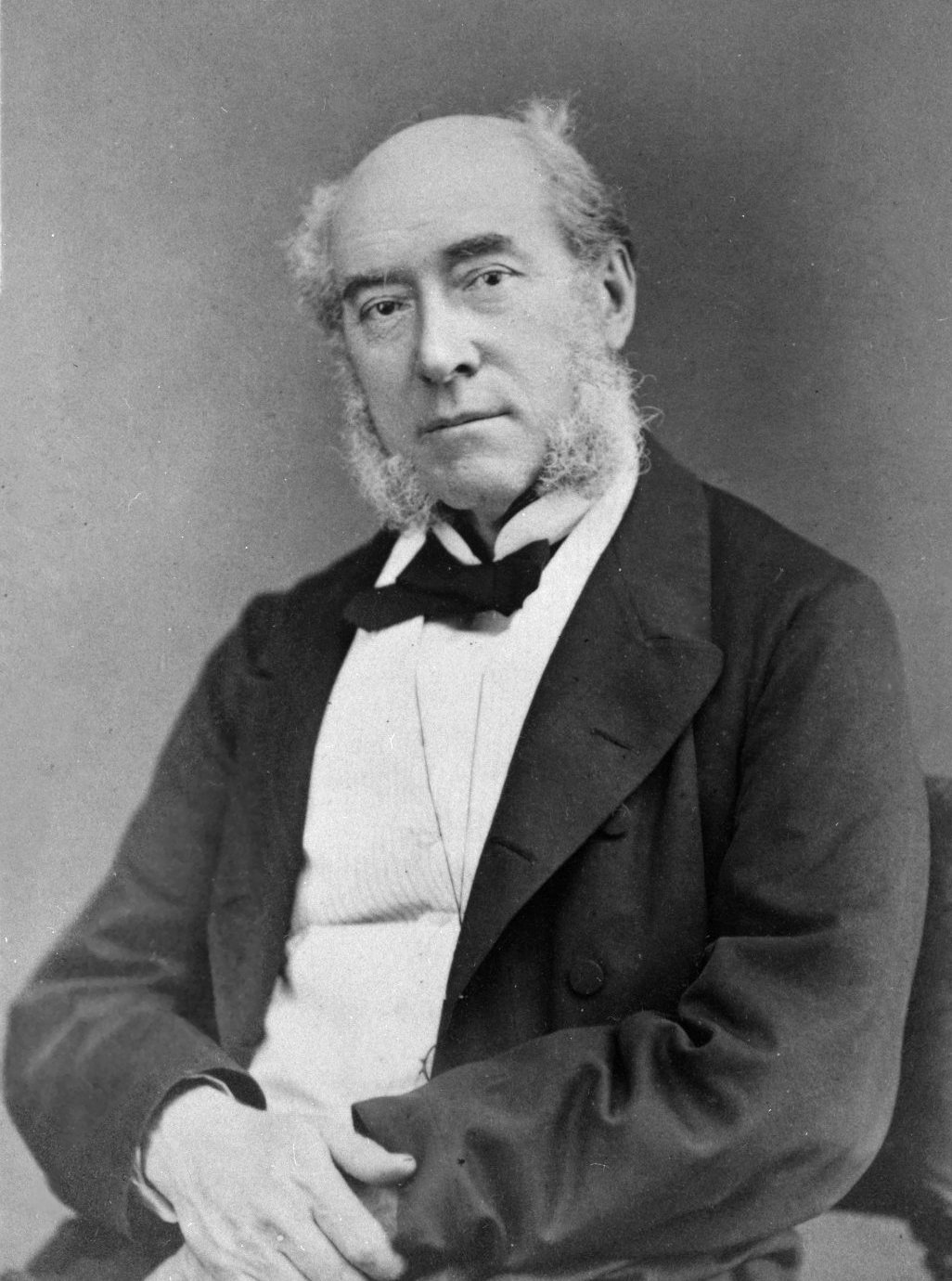
Sir William Fergusson, 1st Baronet

Sir William Fergusson, 1st Baronet FRCS FRS FRSE (20 March 1808 – 10 February 1877) was a Scottish surgeon.

== Biography ==
William Fergusson son of James Fergusson of Lochmaben, Dumfriesshire, was born at Prestonpans, East Lothian on 20 March 1808, and was educated first at Lochmaben and afterwards at the high school and University of Edinburgh. At the age of fifteen he was placed by his own desire in a lawyer's office, but the work proved uncongenial, and at seventeen he exchanged law for medicine, in accordance with his father's original wishes. He became an assiduous pupil of Dr. Robert Knox the anatomist, who was much pleased with a piece of mechanism which Fergusson constructed, and appointed him at the age of twenty demonstrator to his class of four hundred pupils.

In 1828 Fergusson became a licentiate, and in 1829 a fellow of the Edinburgh College of Surgeons. He continued zealous in anatomy, often spending from twelve to sixteen hours a day in the dissecting-room. Two of his preparations, admirably dissected, are still preserved in the museum of the Edinburgh College of Surgeons. Soon after qualifying Fergusson began to deliver a portion of the lectures on general anatomy, in association with Knox, and to demonstrate surgical anatomy. In 1831 he was elected surgeon to the Edinburgh Royal Dispensary, and in that year tied the subclavian artery, which had then been done in Scotland only twice. On 10 October 1833 he married Helen, daughter and heiress of William Ranken of Spittlehaugh, Peeblesshire. This marriage placed him in easy circumstances, but he did not relax his efforts after success in operative surgery, and by 1836, when he was elected surgeon to the Royal Infirmary of Edinburgh and fellow of the Royal Society of Edinburgh, he shared with James Syme the best surgical practice in Scotland.

In 1840 Fergusson accepted the professorship of surgery at King's College London, with the surgeoncy to King's College Hospital, and established himself at Dover Street, Piccadilly, whence he removed in 1847 to 16 George Street, now St George's Street, Hanover Square. He became M.R.C.S. Engl. in 1840, and fellow in 1844. His practice grew rapidly, and the fame of his operative skill brought many students and visitors to King's College Hospital. In 1849 he was appointed surgeon in ordinary to the prince consort, and in 1855 surgeon extraordinary, and in 1867 sergeant-surgeon to the queen.

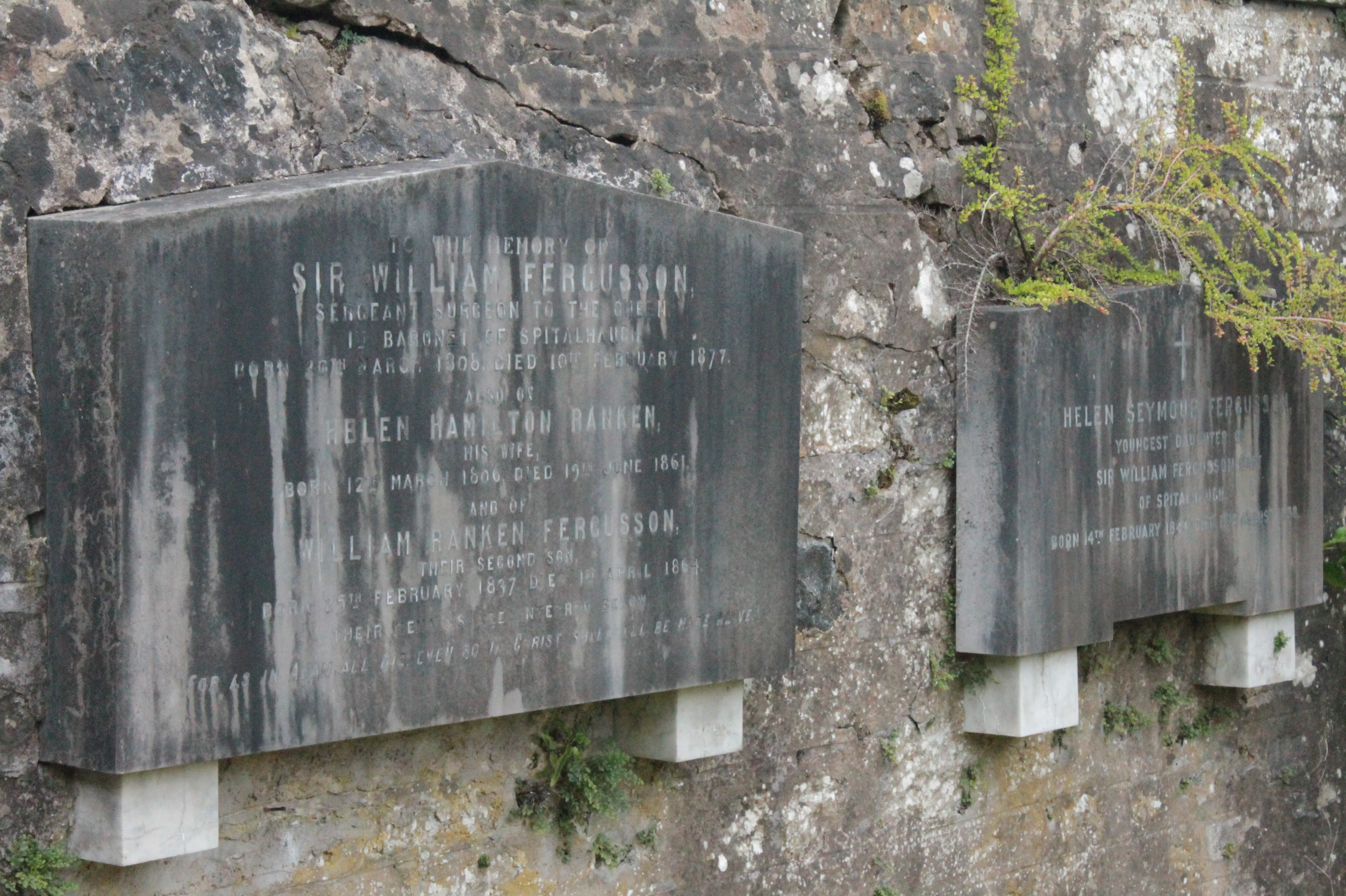
The grave of Sir William Fergusson surgeon, West Linton

For many years Fergusson was the leading operator in London. He was elected as president for two years of the Pathological Society of London in 1859. He was elected to the council of the College of Surgeons in 1861, examiner in 1867, and was president of the college in 1870. As professor of human anatomy and surgery he delivered two courses of lectures before the College of Surgeons in 1864 and 1865, which were afterwards published. He was president of the British Medical Association in 1873. In 1875, he received the honorary degree of LL.D. from Edinburgh University. He resigned the professorship of surgery at King's College in 1870, but until his death was clinical professor of surgery and senior surgeon to King's College Hospital. He was also a fellow of the Royal Society. He was created a baronet on 23 January 1866, an honour which led to his receiving a presentation from three hundred old pupils, consisting of a silver dessert service worth £400, at the annual dinner of old King's College men on 21 June 1866.

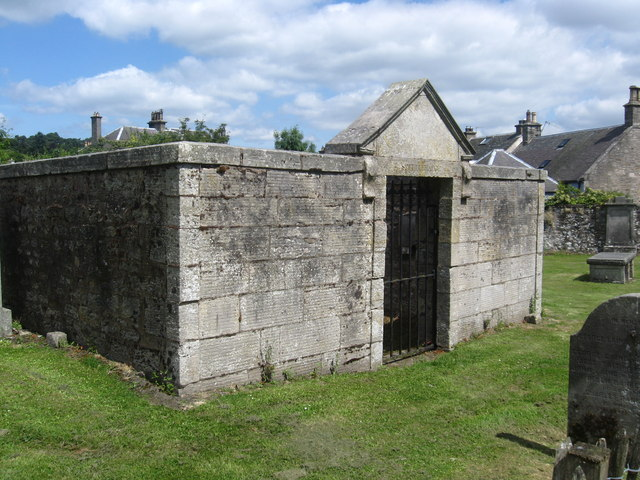
Burial vault of William Fergusson in St. Andrews Kirkyard at West Linton

He died in London after an exhausting illness, of Bright's disease, on 10 February 1877, and was buried at West Linton, Peeblesshire, where his wife had been buried in 1860.

A portrait of Fergusson by Lehmann, painted by subscription, was presented to the London College of Surgeons in 1874, and a replica is in the Edinburgh College of Surgeons.

== Assessment ==
Fergusson's reputation is that of a brilliant operator and a great "conservative" surgeon. The term conservative surgery, first applied by Fergusson in 1852 to operations for the preservation of parts of the body which would otherwise have been sacrificed, does not denote merely operations which he originated or improved, for James Syme had already been very successful in this line of procedure. But Fergusson extended the principle from the operation of excision of the elbow joint to many others. No portion of the body which could be usefully preserved was too small for him to make efforts to save. Among operations with which his name is specially identified are those for harelip and cleft palate, and operations on the jaws, the excision of joints, notably the hip, knee, and elbow, lithotomy and lithotrity, and amputations of limbs. His skill in dissection, and his careful study of the actions of the muscles which he had to cut through, were of essential importance to his success. In his lectures at the College of Surgeons he was able to speak of three hundred successful operations of his own for harelip. The operation for cleft palate had been largely abandoned till he took it up anew. His manipulative and mechanical skill was shown both in his modes of operating, and in the new instruments he devised. The bulldog forceps, the mouth-gag for cleft palate, and various bent knives attest his ingenuity. A still higher mark of his ability consisted in his perfect planning of every detail of an operation beforehand; no emergency was unprovided for. Thus, when an operation had begun, he proceeded with remarkable speed and silence till the end, himself applying every bandage and plaster, and leaving, as far as possible, no traces of his operation. So silently were most of his operations conducted, that he was often imagined to be on bad terms with his assistants. His punctuality and his hatred of unnecessary waste of time were very marked.

As a lecturer, out of the operating theatre, Fergusson did not shine, owing to his reticence and his imperfect command of abstract subjects; although on points of practice he gave excellent instruction. In the operating theatre his remarks on the cases before him were valuable and instructive. To students he was most kind and generous. He had to sustain much opposition, especially from Syme, but he did not imitate his opponent's mode of controversy; and if on any occasion he imagined he had said or done something to hurt another's feelings, he never rested till he had made reparation in some form.

Fergusson was a successful carpenter, rivalling established artisans. As a student he made himself a brass-bound dissecting case, and in 1834 completed a lithotrite, with a novel rack and pinion, which he used throughout life. He was a violinist, an fly-fisher, and very fond of drama. He never seemed tired, and scarcely had a day's illness till attacked by Bright's disease. He was known to be tall, dignified, and of good presence, of genial though keen expression, fond of a joke, and very hospitable. He rendered gratuitous aid to large numbers of clergymen, actors, authors, and governesses. He helped many of his pupils in starting in life, a large number of whom attained eminence as surgeons. He never forgot the face of a pupil.

In some expressions of opinion Fergusson was ill-advised, especially in matters requiring more knowledge of physiology and hygiene than he possessed. His evidence before the royal commission on vivisection, and his relations with homeopathic practitioners, which he was led to modify, are instances of this. But his faults were faults of sympathy, not of self-conceit or intolerance of criticism.

== Family ==
On 10 October 1833, Fergusson married Helen Hamilton Ranken, daughter and heiress of William Ranken of Spittlehaugh, Peeblesshire. They had two sons: Sir James Ranken Fergusson (eldest son and heir) and Charles Hamilton (who would eventually rise to the rank of major in the army), and three daughters.

== Bibliography ==
Fergusson's principal work is his

- System of Practical Surgery, London, 1842; fifth edition 1870. (https://archive.org/stream/5thsystemofpract00ferguoft#page/606/mode/2up), where he mentions the incision used for removing maxillary tumors (known as the Weber & Fergusson incision)

He also wrote

- Lectures on the Progress of Anatomy and Surgery during the Present Century, 1867 (also in Lancet, 1864–1867);

and the following papers and pamphlets:

- "On Lithotrity", in Edinburgh Medical and Surgical Journal, volume xliv.;
- "Account of the Dissection of a Patient in whom the Subclavian Artery had been Tied for Axillary Aneurism", in London and Edinburgh Monthly Journal of Medical Science, September 1841;
- "Case of Aneurism of the Innominata, treated by Ligature of the Right Carotid Artery", in London and Edinburgh Monthly Journal of Medical Science November 1841;
- Introductory Lecture at King's College London, 1848;
- Hunterian Oration, 1871;
- "Observations on Cleft Palate and on Staphyloraphy", Med.-Chir. Trans., volume xxviii.;
- "Case of Excision of the Upper End of the Femur", Med.-Chir. Trans., xxviii.;
- "Case of Resection of the Scapula", Med.-Chir. Trans., xxxi.;
- "On the Treatment of Aneurism by Manipulation", Med.-Chir. Trans., xl.;
- see also Lancet during many years for reports of cases under his care.

Baronetage of the United Kingdom
Preceded by New creation	Baronet (of Spitalhaugh); 1866–1877	Succeeded by James Ranken Fergusson
