= Blanche Dugdale =

British author and Zionist (1880-1948)

Blanche "Baffy" Dugdale
- Born: Blanche Elizabeth Campbell Balfour; 23 May 1880; Holland Park, London, England
- Died: 16 May 1948 (aged 67); Kilkerran House, by Maybole, Ayrshire, Scotland
- Education: at home
- Occupations: author and Zionist
- Spouse: Edgar Trevelyan Stratford Dugdale (m. 1902)
- Children: 2
- Parents: Eustace James Anthony Balfour (father); Lady Frances Campbell (mother)
- Relatives: Francis Balfour (brother); Arthur Balfour (uncle); Sir James Fergusson, 8th Baronet (son-in-law); George Campbell, 8th Duke of Argyll (maternal grandfather); Elizabeth Campbell, Duchess of Argyll (maternal grandmother)

Blanche Elizabeth Campbell "Baffy" Dugdale (née Balfour, 23 May 1880 – 16 May 1948) was a British author and Zionist. Chaim Weizmann called her, "an ardent, lifelong friend of Zionism".

== Early life ==
She was born Blanche Elizabeth Campbell Balfour on 23 May 1880 at 32 Addison Road, Holland Park, London, the eldest of the five children of Eustace James Anthony Balfour (1854–1911), an architect and the youngest brother of prime minister Arthur Balfour, and his wife, Lady Frances Campbell (1858–1931), daughter of George Campbell, 8th Duke of Argyll. She was educated at home, and received no formal education. She was always known as "Baffy", a childhood rendering of her surname, Balfour.

== Career ==
Dugdale worked in the Naval Intelligence Department. She was associated with the League of Nations Union in various role from its founding in 1920 until it ended, and was one of the British delegates to the 1932 League Assembly.

She provided faithful encouragement and help to the Polish-Jewish historian Lewis Namier while he was writing The Structure of Politics at the Accession of George III, first published in 1929.

She always signed her articles Blanche E. C. Dugdale, but everyone knew her as Baffy Dugdale. Chaim Weizmann called her, "an ardent, lifelong friend of Zionism". In 1936, she published a two-volume biography Arthur James Balfour about her uncle, the Prime Minister Arthur Balfour.

== Personal life ==
Balfour married on 18 November 1902, at St Mary Abbots church, Kensington, to Edgar Trevelyan Stratford Dugdale (1876–1964), a Lloyd's of London underwriter and "name", the second son of William Stratford Dugdale of Merevale Hall, Atherstone, Warwickshire. It was at her suggestion that Edgar made his abridged translation of Mein Kampf. They had two children, Frances and Michael, and lived at no. 1 Roland Gardens, South Kensington, London.

== Later life ==
Dugdale died on 16 May 1948 (the day after she had heard that the state of Israel was established) at Kilkerran House, by Maybole, Ayrshire, the home of her daughter and son-in-law Sir James Fergusson, 8th Baronet.
