= Douglas Allan Green =

Australian graphic designer, artist and teacher (1921–2002)

Douglas Allan Green (1921 in Ballarat – 2002) was an Australian graphic designer, artist and teacher.

== Early life and training ==
Born in Ballarat, Green's father was Bert H. L. Green.

He was a commercial artist while a student at the Melbourne Technical College. He showed paintings, including a work, described by Herald art critic Basil Burdett as a "fresh, honest water-colour sketch," in the third Heidelberg art exhibition in 1940. He then enlisted at age twenty and was a sergeant in New Guinea and the Philippines with an Australian army survey unit during World War II. As a student of the Technical College, he joined an exhibition of their work in November 1944 at the Melbourne Athenaeum, amongst other service personnel; George Allen, Ray Ewers, Stanley Hammond, William Dargle, Murray Griffin, Reginald Rowed, K. W, D. Jack, Wilfred McCulloch, Alan Moore, and Harold Freedman. The Age reviewer of the show identified Green as "a gifted artist, whose best efforts are: Della's Tobacco Burns, Barron Falls and Falls, Adelaide River, N.T.. This painter has versatility and a technique capable of unlimited expansion."

As a returned soldier, Green enrolled at the National Gallery school from 1944 to 1947, and concurrently at the George Bell School, 1946–7. He showed watercolour with the Victorian Artists Society, again noticed favourably by The Herald critic in 1946, and 1947.

His painting Second Class, showing the interior of a railway carriage incorporated portraits of fellow students John Brack, with whom he shared a studio on the corner of Bourke and Queen Streets, (Grahame King, according to Christopher Heathcote) Helen Maudsley and Fred Williams, won him the NGV Travelling Scholarship of £350 ($24,460.00 at 2022 value) a year for two years with a maximum of £200 additional for fares, in 1947. The Argus in an article titled 'Problem in Art Awards' framed his win as a triumph for those favouring modernism over the favourite of the traditional faction, Judy Perrey. Hansen writes of Second Class that while other artists were "representing white-collar workers as cocky and absurd automata, Douglas Green produced a more sympathetic vision of their tedious, fatiguing existence." Heathcote remarks that in 1947 "it was considered raucously moderne, some viewers being shocked by the rounded modelling and everyday subject matter." The work is held in the collection of Warrnambool Art Gallery. Arriving in England he attended the London County Council School of Arts and Craft.

== Career ==
From his residence at 21 Roland Gardens South Kensington, and with his wife Helen, they returned to Melbourne in January 1952 aboard the Strathmore, Green worked first as a graphic designer, then as an art teacher with the Victorian Education Department. He produced and exhibited trompe l'oeil paintings of plant forms and exhibited more successfully in the 1980s, including at Pinacotheca gallery. His work was seen in The Face of Australia, touring exhibition, 1988, and Classical Modernism: The George Bell Circle, at the National Gallery of Victoria in 1992

Late in his career, in the 1990s, Green lived in Castlemaine where he made coloured drawings of dead mistletoe.

== Awards ==
- NGV Travelling Scholarship, 1947

== Collections ==
- Art Gallery of Ballarat
- Warrnambool Art Gallery
- Castlemaine Art Museum
