= Sir James Fergusson, 8th Baronet =

Scottish broadcaster & journalist (1904-1973)

Sir James Fergusson 8th Baronet of Kilkerran, FRSE
- Born: 18 September 1904; Dailly, Ayrshire, Scotland
- Died: 25 October 1973 (aged 69)
- Education: Eton College; Balliol College, Oxford
- Occupations: Journalist & broadcaster
- Spouse: Louise Frances Balfour Stratford Dugdale (m. 1930)
- Children: 4
- Father: Sir Charles Fergusson, 7th Baronet
- Relatives: Adam Fergusson (son); Tim Renton (son-in-law); Bernard Fergusson (brother); David Boyle (maternal grandfather)

Sir James Fergusson, 8th Baronet of Kilkerran, FRSE (18 September 1904 – 25 October 1973) was a Scottish aristocrat, broadcaster, journalist and historian.

== Life ==
Fergusson was born in Dailly in Ayrshire on 18 September 1904 the son of Sir Charles Fergusson, 7th Baronet of Kilkerran and his wife, Lady Alice Mary Boyle, daughter of David Boyle, 7th Earl of Glasgow. His younger brother was Bernard Fergusson, Baron Ballantrae. He was sent to Eton College then went to Balliol College, Oxford.

Fergusson initially worked as a writer for Blackwood’s Magazine in Edinburgh. In 1934 he joined BBC Scotland as assistant to the Scottish Regional Director, Melville Dinwiddie. He also was a town councillor for Haddington, East Lothian. During the Second World War, he resisted a transfer to Glasgow and instead joined the BBC Home Service, giving commentary on Nazi propaganda and making a tour of the Middle East.

After the war, Fergusson became lead-writer for the Glasgow Herald (1945 to 1949). From 1947 to 1968, he also appeared on the popular long-running radio show "Round Britain Quiz" with Jack House.

From 1949, he was made the official Keeper of the Records of Scotland based at Register House on Princes Street in Edinburgh. He remained in the post until 1969, during which period the scale and function of the records office greatly increased. After his departure the expansion included the conversion of St George's Church, Charlotte Square to create West Register House. Upon the death of his father in February 1951 he became 8th Baronet of Kilkerran.

In 1960, Fergusson was awarded an honorary doctorate (LLD) from the University of Glasgow.

In 1968 Fergusson was elected a Fellow of the Royal Society of Edinburgh. His proposers were Neil Campbell, Lord Balerno, Edmund Hirst, and Anthony Elliot Ritchie. He was a Trustee of the National Gallery of Scotland, Member of the Royal Commission on Historic Manuscripts, and Trustee of the National Trust for Scotland. He was a member of the Royal Company of Archers. He was Lord Lieutenant of Ayrshire 1969–73.

Fergusson died on 25 October 1973. He was buried in the family graveyard at Kilkerran.

== Publications ==
Fergusson was an active member of the committee of the History of Parliament Project. His books include:

- Letters of George Dempster to Sir Adam Fergusson (1934)
- Lowland Lairds (1949)
- Argyll in the Forty-Five (1951)
- The Sixteen Peers of Scotland (1960)
- The White Hind (1963) (a study of the Appin Murder Case)
- The Curragh Incident (1964)
- The Man Behind MacBeth (1969)
- The Declaration of Arbroath 1320 (1970)

== Family ==
Fergusson married Louise Frances Balfour Stratford Dugdale (daughter of Edgar Dugdale and Blanche Dugdale) in 1930. They had two sons: Charles who became 9th Baronet of Kilkerran, and Adam Fergusson (MEP). They had two daughters: Alice, who married Tim Renton, Baron Renton of Mount Harry; and Christian who died in a car crash aged 14.

Baronetage of Nova Scotia
Preceded by Charles Fergusson	Baronet (of Kilkerran); 1951–1973	Succeeded by Charles Fergusson
