= Edgar Dugdale =

British translator

- Born: Edgar Trevelyan Stratford Dugdale; 22 July 1876
- Died: 14 October 1964 (aged 88)
- Occupations: Translator and writer
- Known for: First English translation of Mein Kampf
- Spouse: Blanche Elizabeth Campbell Balfour (m. 1902; died 1948)
- Children: 2
- Relatives: Sir James Fergusson, 8th Baronet (son-in-law)

Edgar Trevelyan Stratford Dugdale (22 July 1876 – 14 October 1964) was a translator, completing the first English translation of Mein Kampf. He gained the rank of captain in the Leicestershire Yeomanry and held the office of Justice of the Peace.

The first English translation of Mein Kampf was an abridgment by Edgar Dugdale, who began work on it in 1931, at the prompting of his wife Blanche. When he learned that the London publishing firm of Hurst & Blackett had secured the rights to publish an abridgment in the United Kingdom, he offered it gratis in April 1933. However, a local Nazi Party representative insisted that the translation be further abridged before publication, so it was held back from the public until 13 October 1933, although excerpts were allowed to run in The Times in late July.

In America, Houghton Mifflin secured the rights to the Dugdale abridgment on 29 July 1933. The only differences between the American and British versions are that the title was translated as My Struggle in the UK and My Battle in America; and that Dugdale is credited as translator in the U.S. edition, while the British version withheld his name. No official reason was given for Dugdale's request for anonymity in the British edition, but his wife was a prominent Zionist, and the niece of Arthur Balfour, and they wished to avoid publicity.

In 1934, Dugdale published a biography of the British diplomat Maurice de Bunsen, who had died two years earlier.

== Family ==
Dugdale married on 18 November 1902, at St Mary Abbots church, Kensington, to Blanche Elizabeth Campbell Balfour (1880–1948), the eldest daughter of Eustace James Anthony Balfour (1854–1911), an architect and the youngest brother of the prime minister Arthur Balfour, and his wife, Lady Frances Campbell (1858–1931), daughter of George Campbell, 8th Duke of Argyll. They had two children, Frances and Michael, and lived at no. 1 Roland Gardens, South Kensington, London. His daughter Frances married Sir James Fergusson, 8th Baronet of Kilkerran.
