= Blakes Hotel =

Hotel in London, England

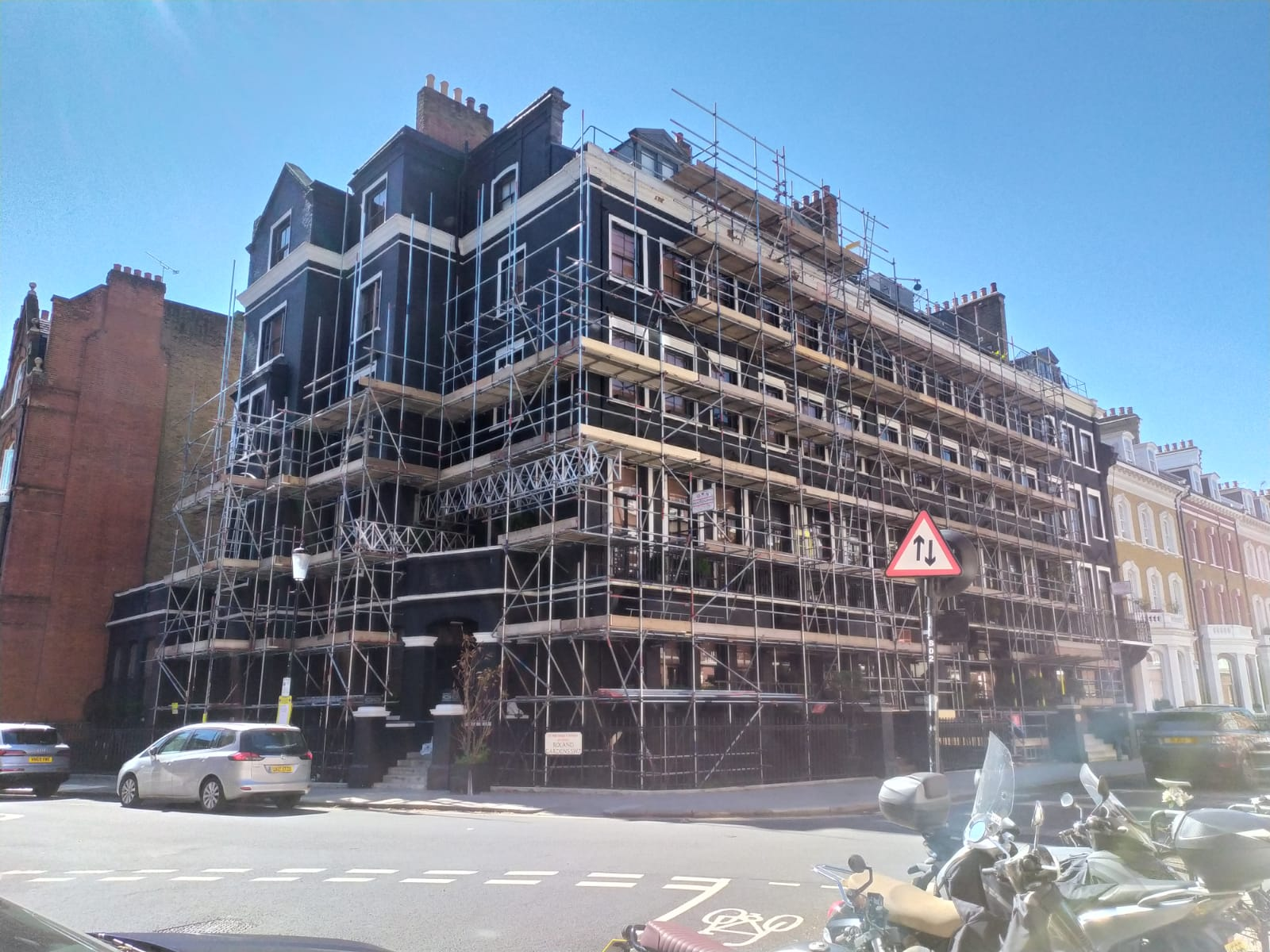
- Blakes Hotel in Kensington undergoing renovations in 2021

- Location within Central London

General information
- Location: 33 Roland Gardens, South Kensington, London, England
- Coordinates: 51°29′21.08″N 0°10′49.12″W

Other information
- Number of rooms: 45

Website
- www.blakeshotels.com

Blakes Hotel is a 5-star hotel in London, and considered one of the world's first boutique hotels. It is at 33 Roland Gardens in South Kensington. It was established by London hotelier and designer Anouska Hempel, and contains eclectic artifacts collected by Hempel during her international travels. Known for protecting its clients' privacy from the paparazzi, it often accommodates celebrities. Regular guests have included Princess Margaret; Sarah Ferguson; actresses Gwyneth Paltrow and Lindsay Lohan; and supermodel Kate Moss..

The hotel is also home to a Mediterranean-style restaurant and an exclusive lounge named Blakes Below, which debuted in 2016.

The hotel was mentioned as a plot point in Sofia Coppola's 2020 film On the Rocks.

The hotel has been closed since May 31, 2022.

== Interior ==
The hotel's 45 rooms were designed with varied influences; Asian, Moroccan and Colonial styles are conspicuous.

The single rooms contain French double beds with blacks and whites in an eclectic style. The double rooms are styled as Indenture or Provençal design, including antique swan beds. The Director's Double has European king-sized beds which are either French gilded antique swan or four-poster. The Luxury Suites, decorated in various styles, have European king-sized four-poster beds with extra high ceilings and their own balconies with French windows. The Library Suite has hidden cupboards behind fake bookshelves, silk wall hangings, and a double-height four-poster bed.
