= Stanley Bate =

English composer and pianist

- Born: 12 December 1911; Milehouse, Devonport, England
- Died: 19 October 1959 (aged 47); Kensington, London, England
- Education: Royal College of Music
- Occupations: Composer, pianist
- Notable work: Symphony No. 3, Viola Concerto, Piano Concerto No. 3
- Spouse(s): Peggy Glanville-Hicks (m. 1938–div. 1949), Margarida Guedes Nogueira

Stanley Bate (12 December 1911 – 19 October 1959) was an English composer and pianist.

== Education and early career ==
Bate was born at Milehouse in the County Borough of Devonport, and received his first musical education from local teachers. He took to the piano early and by the age of 12 had secured a post as organist at Herbert Street Methodist Church in Devonport. His first opera, The Forest Enchanted, was completed in 1928 when he was 17, and produced locally with Bate conducting. Winning a scholarship to the Royal College of Music, he studied under Ralph Vaughan Williams, R.O. Morris, Gordon Jacob, and Arthur Benjamin. Compositions from this time include the String Quartet No 1 (1936) and the Symphony No 1 in E♭, which was first performed at the College in 1936. He went on to study abroad, for two years, first in Paris with Nadia Boulanger and then in Berlin with Paul Hindemith.

On his return to the UK in 1937 Bate was commissioned to compose the Concertino for piano and chamber orchestra, performed at the Eastbourne Music Festival in February 1938 with Frederic Lamond as the soloist, conducted by Kneale Kelly. Bate also began writing incidental music for theatre director Michel Saint-Denis (including productions of Twelfth Night and The Cherry Orchard) and produced two ballet scores - Perseus for Les Trois Arts and Cap Over Mill, for Ballet Rambert.

== Marriage and wartime travel ==
While at the College Bate met Australian-born fellow student and composer Peggy Glanville-Hicks. Although Bate was openly homosexual they married in 1938 and remained together until a divorce in 1949. She was very supportive of his career, at some cost to her own. There were also reports of domestic violence. After the divorce Bate married the Brazilian diplomat Margarida Guedes Nogueira.

At the outbreak of war Bate embarked on British Council funded tours of the US, Australia and Brazil, promoting British culture. With Glanville-Hicks he moved to America in 1941 and saw great successes there, including a performance in February 1942 at Carnegie Hall of his Second Piano Concerto by the New York Philharmonic Orchestra conducted by Thomas Beecham with the composer as soloist. A grant by the Guggenheim Foundation in April 1942 helped with funding. Other successful US premieres included the Sinfonietta No 1 in 1942 (ISCM, Berkeley California), the String Quartet No 2, given by the Lener Quartet in 1943, and the Viola Concerto in 1946, performed by Emanuel Vardi with the NBC Symphony Orchestra.

== Return to the UK ==
Returning to the UK in 1949 (via Brussels and Paris), Bate found it hard to replicate his international successes at home. However, the Violin Concerto No 3 (1947–50) received a successful performance at the Royal Festival Hall with the London Symphony Orchestra and Antonio Brosa soloist in 1953. The premiere of the Symphony No 3 at the Cheltenham Festival in 1954 - some fourteen years after its completion - was unanimously well received by critics. The Musical Times called it "exhilarating, hard-hitting music". The BBC has been criticised for its lack of support for his music, but it did stage the world premiere of his Piano Concerto No 3 at the Proms on 30 August 1957 with the composer as soloist and Malcolm Sargent conducting the BBC Symphony Orchestra. And the first broadcast of the Symphony No 4 was given on 3 April 1958 by the BBC Northern Orchestra, conducted by Lawrence Leonard.

Short of money and depressed by his lack of recognition, Bate died in 1959 aged 47, having suffered a breakdown a few months before. He was found dead at his flat in Roland Gardens, Kensington. The coroner's verdict was death due to complications of alcohol, though other reports suggested a drug overdose.

== Music ==
The music of Stanley Bate quickly fell into obscurity following his death. The Third Symphony (1940) was long regarded as his best work in his home country, although critics were quick to point out its influences. "The second subject of the first movement is almost pure Vaughan Williams, the slow movement almost pure Hindemith, and Boulanger's influence may be detected in the Stravinskian rhythms of the last movement", wrote the Manchester Guardian critic. The opening of Walton's landmark Symphony No. 1, which preceded it by five years, is echoed in the opening figures of the finale. Mark Lehman described the work as "very much a 'war symphony' with kinships to the contemporaneous symphonies of Arthur Benjamin, Richard Arnell and Bernard Herrmann". There was a further performance of the Third Symphony at Cheltenham in 1965, but it took until 2006 for a new performance to be broadcast, followed by a commercial recording in 2010.

That same year, a recording of the Viola Concerto (1944–46) by Roger Chase and the BBC Concert Orchestra conducted by Stephen Bell helped spark a modern revival of interest. This intensively lyrical work also immediately brings to mind the music of Vaughan Williams, to whom it is dedicated. Recordings of the Symphony No 4 (1954–55) followed in 2011, and the Third Piano Concerto (1938) and Sinfonietta No 1 (1940) in 2012. A recording of the Cello Concerto (1954) was issued by Lyrita in 2015.

The world premiere of his Second Symphony (1937-39) took place on 23 May 2025 at the English Music Festival in Dorchester, by the BBC Concert Orchestra, conducted by Martin Yates.

== Works ==
Opera
- The Forest Enchanted, 1928
- All for the Queen, 1929–30

Ballet

- Eros, 1935
- Goyescas, 1937
- Juanita (mime-ballet), 1938
- Cap over Mill, Op. 27, 1939
- Perseus, Op. 26, 1939 (published Schott, 1941)
- Dance Variations, Op. 49, 1944–6
- Highland Fling, 1946
- Troilus and Cressida, Op. 60, 1948

Incidental music

- Electra (Sophocles), 1938
- Bodas de Sangre (Federico García Lorca), c. 1938
- The Cherry Orchard (Anton Chekhov), c. 1938
- Twelfth Night (Shakespeare), c. 1938
- The White Guard, c. 1938
- The Patriots (Sidney Kingsley), 1944

Film music

- The Fifth Year, 1944
- Jean Helion, 1946
- The Pleasure Garden, 1952–3
- Light through the Ages, 1953

Orchestral

- Symphony No. 1 in E♭ (fp 1936)
- Symphony No. 2, Op. 20, 1937–9
- Sinfonietta No. 1, Op. 22, 1938
- Symphony No. 3, Op. 29, 1940
- Sinfonietta No. 2, Op. 39, 1944
- Pastorale, Op. 48a, c. 1946
- Concerto Grosso, 1952
- Symphony No. 4, 1954–5
- Associated-Rediffusion March, c.1957

Concertante

- Piano Concertante, Op. 24, 1936–8 (published Schott, 1941)
- Concertino, Op. 21, 1937
- Piano Concerto No. 2, Op. 28, 1940
- Concerto for Two Pianos and Orchestra, Op. 43
- Violin Concerto. No. 2, Op. 42, 1943
- Haneen, Op. 50, 1944 (aka Fantasy on an Arabian Theme for flute, gong and strings)
- Viola Concerto, Op. 46, 1944–6
- Violin Concerto No. 3, Op. 58, 1947–50
- Piano Concerto No. 3, Op. 66, 1951–2
- Harpsichord Concerto, 1952–5
- Cello Concerto, 1953
- Piano Concerto No. 4, c. 1955
- Piano Concerto No. 5, 1958

Chamber music

- String Quartet No. 1, 1936
- Flute Sonata, Op. 11, 1937 (published Oiseau-Lyre, 1938)
- Five Pieces, for string quartet, Op. 23, c. 1937
- Sonatina for recorder, Op. 12, 1938
- String Quartet No. 2, Op. 41, 1942
- Violin Sonata No. 1, Op. 47, 1946
- Oboe Sonata, Op. 52, 1946
- Fantasy for cello, Op. 56, 1946–7
- Recitative for Cello, Op. 52a, 1946–7
- Pastorale, Op. 57, c. 1947
- Violin Sonata No. 2, 1950

Piano

- Six Pieces for an Infant Prodigy, Op. 13, c. 1938
- Two Sonatinas, Op. 19, 1939–41
- Romance and Toccata, Op. 25, 1941
- Sonatinas Nos. 3–9, Opp. 30–6, 1942–3
- Overture to a Russian War Relief Concert, Op. 37, c. 1943
- Three Pieces for two pianos, Op. 38, 1943
- Sonata No. 1, Op. 45, 1943
- Piano Suite No. 1, Op. 44, 1943
- Three Mazurkas, Op. 38a, 1944
- Sonata No. 2, Op. 59, 1947
- Sonata No. 3, Op. 62, 1949
- 17 Preludes, Op. 64, 1949
- Prelude, Rondo and Toccata, 1953

Vocal

- Incantations (E. Jolas), Op. 48 (published Scott/AMP, 1945)
- Four Songs (A.E. Housman), Op. 51, 1945
- Pomes Penyeach (James Joyce), Op. 53, 1946
- Three Songs (C. Day-Lewis, E. Sitwell, Joyce), Op. 55, 1946
- Three Songs (Hilaire Belloc), Op. 61, 1947–8
- Six Songs (S. Smith), 1952
