= Lord Lieutenant of Ayrshire =

Ceremonial officer in Ayrshire, Scotland

This is a list of people who served as Lord Lieutenant of Ayrshire, Scotland. The post was abolished in 1975, being replaced by the Lord Lieutenant of Ayrshire and Arran.

- Archibald Montgomerie, 11th Earl of Eglinton 17 March 1794 – 30 October 1796
- Hugh Montgomerie, 12th Earl of Eglinton 23 November 1796 – 14 December 1819
- George Boyle, 4th Earl of Glasgow 7 January 1820 – 15 August 1842
- Archibald Montgomerie, 13th Earl of Eglinton 15 August 1842 – 4 October 1861
- Archibald Kennedy, 2nd Marquess of Ailsa 4 December 1861 – 20 March 1870
- John Dalrymple, 10th Earl of Stair 15 June 1870 – 1897
- George Montgomerie, 15th Earl of Eglinton 1897 – 10 August 1919
- Archibald Kennedy, 3rd Marquess of Ailsa 16 November 1919 – 1937
- Sir Charles Fergusson, 7th Baronet 18 February 1937 – 1950
- Sir Geoffrey Hughes-Onslow 17 July 1950 – 1969
- Sir James Fergusson, 8th Baronet 7 April 1969 – 25 October 1973
- Col. Bryce Knox 5 March 1974 – 1991

== Deputy Lieutenants ==
- James Thorneycroft 12 April 1901
- James Campbell 12 April 1901

== Notes and references ==
- Sainty, J. C. "Lieutenants and Lord-Lieutenants of Counties (Scotland) 1794-".
