= Evelyn, Wirt County, West Virginia =

Unincorporated community in West Virginia, United States

Evelyn
- Unincorporated community
- Location within the state of West Virginia Evelyn (the United States)
- Coordinates: 38°56′18″N 81°20′39″W
- Country: United States
- State: West Virginia
- County: Wirt
- Elevation: 682 ft (208 m)
- Time zone: UTC-5 (Eastern (EST))
  - Summer (DST): UTC-4 (EDT)
- GNIS ID: 1678819

Evelyn was an unincorporated community in Wirt County, West Virginia.
