= Bernard Fergusson, Baron Ballantrae =

British Army officer and historian (1911–1980)

Brigadier The Right Honourable The Lord Ballantrae KT GCMG GCVO DSO OBE
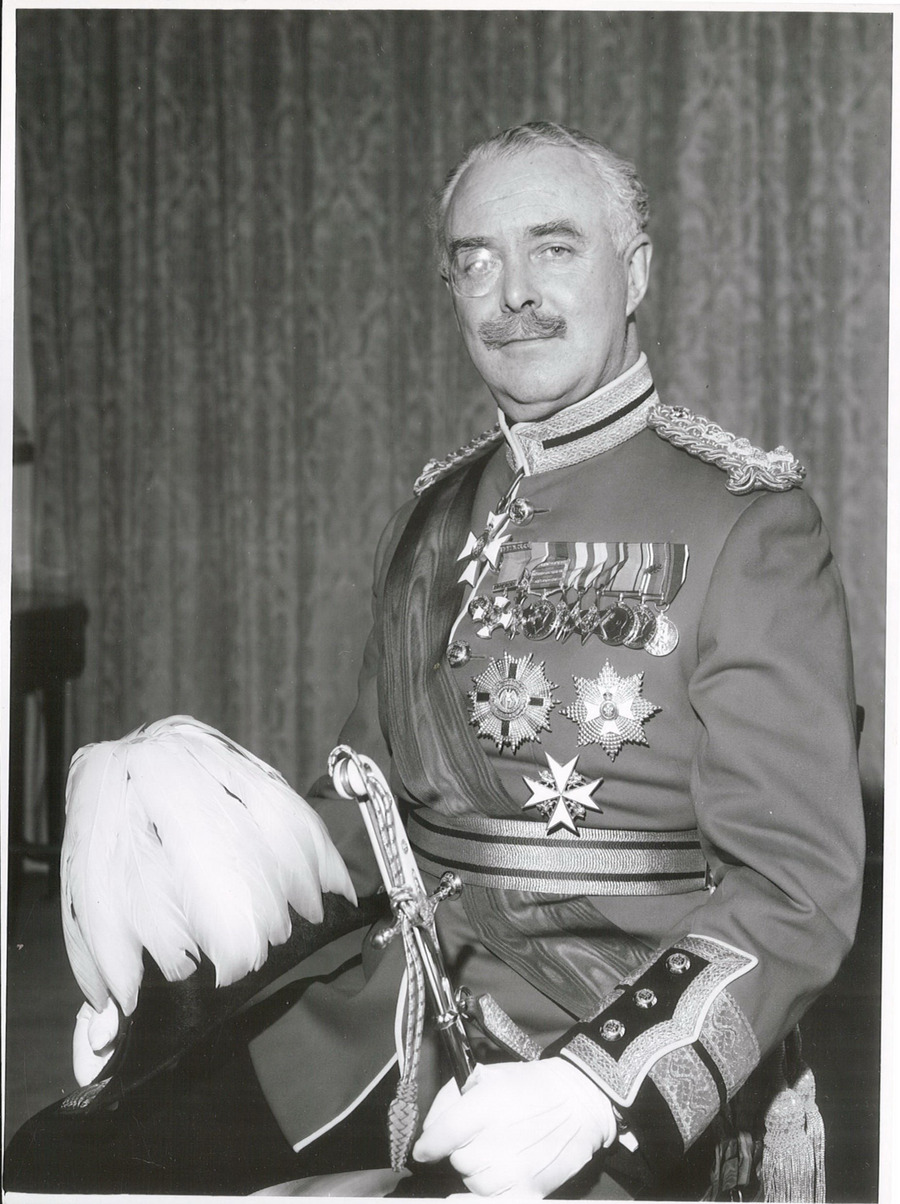
- Fergusson in 1963

10th Governor-General of New Zealand
- In office 9 November 1962 – 20 October 1967
- Monarch: Elizabeth II
- Prime Minister: Keith Holyoake
- Preceded by: The Viscount Cobham
- Succeeded by: The Lord Porritt

Personal details
- Born: 6 May 1911
- Died: 28 November 1980 (aged 69) London, England
- Children: George Fergusson
- Parent: Sir Charles Fergusson (father)
- Relatives: David Boyle, 7th Earl of Glasgow (grandfather); Sir James Fergusson (grandfather)

Military service
- Allegiance: United Kingdom
- Branch/service: British Army
- Years of service: 1931–1958
- Rank: Brigadier
- Unit: Black Watch
- Commands: 1st Battalion, Black Watch; 16th Infantry Brigade
- Battles/wars: Arab revolt in Palestine; Second World War; Palestine Emergency
- Awards: Companion of the Distinguished Service Order; Officer of the Order of the British Empire; Mentioned in Despatches

Brigadier Bernard Edward Fergusson, Baron Ballantrae, KT, GCMG, GCVO, DSO, OBE (6 May 1911 – 28 November 1980) was a British Army officer and military historian who served as the tenth governor-general of New Zealand from 1962 to 1967. He was the last British-born person to hold the position.

== Early life and family ==
Fergusson was the third son and fourth child of Sir Charles Fergusson, 7th Baronet, and his wife Lady Alice Mary Boyle, a daughter of David Boyle, 7th Earl of Glasgow. His older brother was Sir James Fergusson, 8th Baronet, of Kilkerran. Both of his grandfathers had previously served as governors of New Zealand and his father had served as governor-general.

On 22 November 1950 Fergusson married Laura Margaret Grenfell (1920−1979), daughter of Arthur Morton Grenfell, sister of Dame Frances Campbell-Preston, and sister-in-law of Joyce Grenfell. Laura was killed in an accident in 1979 when gales blew a tree onto the car in which she was travelling. She and Bernard had one child, George (Geordie), who served as the British high commissioner to New Zealand from 2006 to 2010 and governor of Bermuda from 2012.

== Military career, 1931–1946 ==
Fergusson was educated at Eton College and the Royal Military College, Sandhurst. From the latter, he was commissioned as a second lieutenant into the Black Watch on 27 August 1931. He served with the 2nd Battalion of his regiment in the British Mandate of Palestine during the Arab revolt and later became aide-de-camp (ADC) to Major General Archibald Wavell, then General Officer Commanding the 2nd Infantry Division in England, on 11 March 1937. At the outbreak of the Second World War, he was on the Directing Staff at the Royal Military Academy, Sandhurst.

In 1940, Fergusson was serving as a brigade major for the 46th Infantry Brigade before becoming a general staff officer in the Middle East, where he also saw active service with Free French forces in Syria and with the Black Watch in Tobruk. In 1942 he served briefly in the Joint Planning Staff in Delhi, before transferring to Orde Wingate's embryonic Chindit force experimenting with Long Range Penetration campaigns. He commanded No. 5 Column in Wingate's 1943 campaign (Operation Longcloth) in Japanese-occupied Burma, for which he was appointed a Companion of the Distinguished Service Order (DSO). In October 1943 he was promoted to acting brigadier and given command of the 16th Infantry Brigade, which was converted into a Chindit formation for operations in the deep jungles of Burma miles behind Japanese lines. He commanded this brigade throughout the Chindit operations of 1944 (Operation Thursday). 16 Brigade, alone of the Chindit brigades, went into Burma on foot in a five week march through very difficult terrain. He established a stronghold, "Aberdeen", in keeping with Wingate's strategic vision and led an unsuccessful assault on the airfields at Indaw before his Brigade was flown out. He was Director of Combined Operations from 1945 to 1946.

He wrote about both Burma campaigns in Beyond the Chindwin and The Wild Green Earth and stood unsuccessfully for Parliament in the 1945 election.

== Service in Palestine, 1946–1947 ==
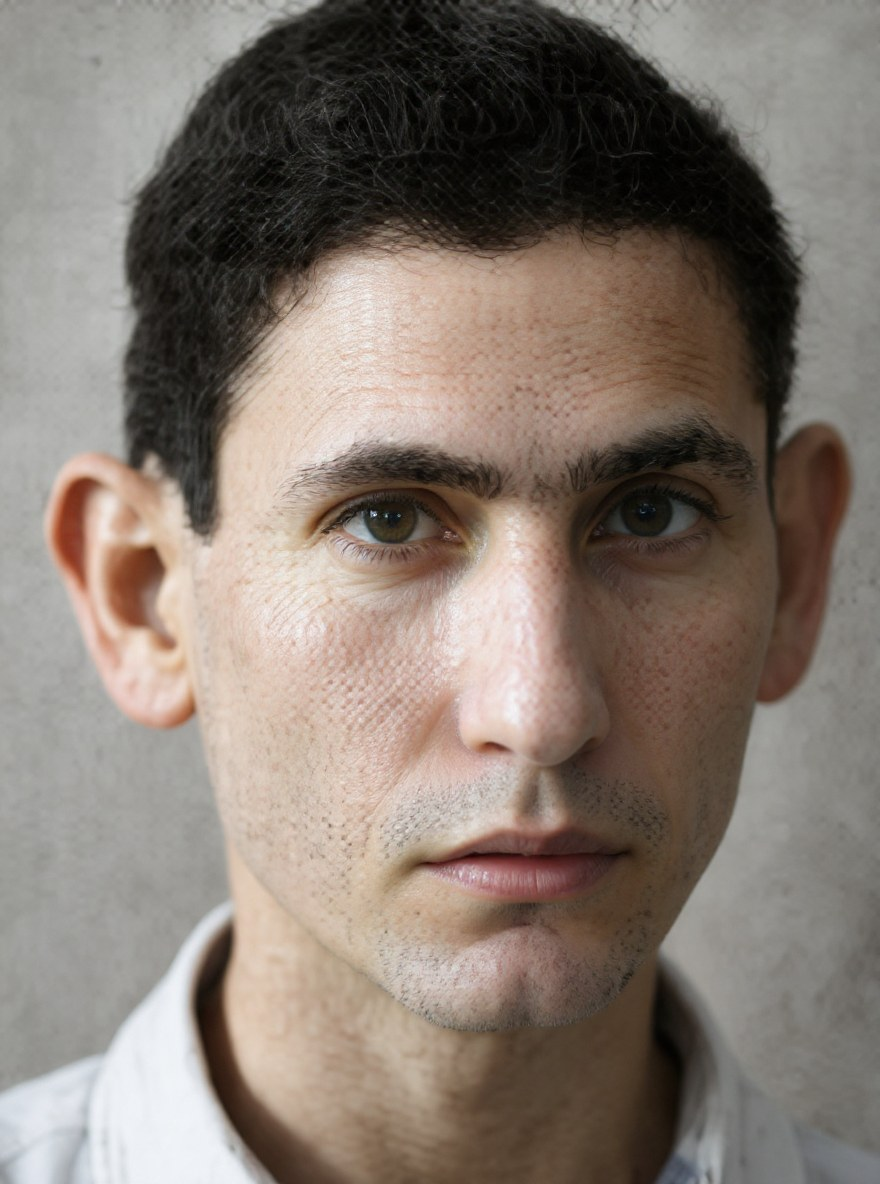
Alexander Rubowitz

In 1946 Fergusson returned to Palestine during the Palestine Emergency as an Assistant Inspector-General in the Palestine Police Force.

He proposed that special units be formed to fight against Zionist paramilitaries, to include serving Palestine police officers and soldiers who had served in the British special forces during the war. This was accepted and one of the resulting units was commanded by Roy Farran, a much-decorated former SAS officer.

In May 1947, Farran's unit arrested 17-year-old Alexander Rubowitz, who was putting up posters in Jerusalem for a Zionist paramilitary organisation, Lehi. Rubowitz was killed under brutal interrogation and his body never found. Farran came under suspicion and in 2004 British secret documents were revealed that included a statement by Fergusson, from the time of the event, to the effect that Farran confessed to Fergusson of the murder. Fergusson had then reported the incident to the head of CID (Criminal Investigation Department) and to the Palestine Police Inspector-General.

At Farran's subsequent trial, Fergusson refused to testify on grounds that he might incriminate himself. The Palestine government announced that no action would be taken against Fergusson. Following Farran's acquittal, Fergusson was relieved of his duties in Palestine and returned to Britain.

== Military career, 1947–1958 ==
Fergusson commanded 1st Battalion, the Black Watch in Germany from 1948 to 1951, was Colonel (Intelligence) at Supreme Headquarters Allied Powers Europe (SHAPE), at Versailles. He later commanded the 153rd (Highland) Brigade in Perth..

He was appointed Director of Psychological Warfare operations during the Suez Crisis, a joint invasion of Egypt by the British, French and Israelis to take control of the Suez Canal. Despite drafting an extensive campaign of psychological warfare for use during the crisis, the actual operations when the Royal Air Force (RAF) commenced aerial campaigns against Egyptian targets were very different and ultimately made little impact on Egyptian morale or public opinion. Psychological warfare radio broadcasts made under Fergusson's direction and directed at Egypt stated that President Gamal Abdel Nasser was under the influence of Zionism and urged Egyptians to attack Israel, which elicited diplomatic protests from future Israeli Prime Minister Golda Meir.

Fergusson's final military appointment was as Commander of 29 Brigade, based in Dover (1957–1958).

== Governor-General of New Zealand ==
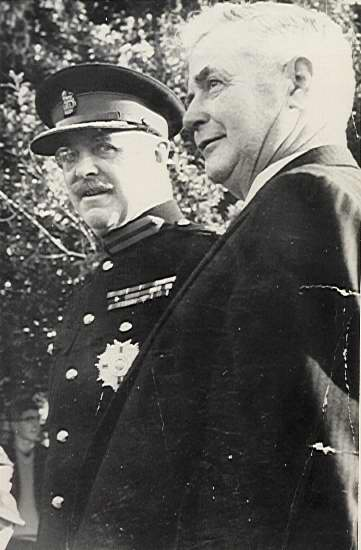
Fergusson as Governor-General (left) with the Mayor of Shannon, P. K. Robinson

Fergusson worked as a writer, based in Ayrshire, Scotland between 1958 and 1962, writing the official history of Combined Operations (The Watery Maze), and serving as a correspondent for the Sunday Times and Sunday Telegraph. In 1962 he was appointed governor-general of New Zealand, serving until 1967. Although he had the physical appearance of a very traditional British officer, he became a popular governor-general. He was an early and strong advocate for greater knowledge and respect on the part of pākehā (European) New Zealanders for Māori language and tikanga. He was the first governor or governor-general to speak Māori since Governor George Grey (governor 1845–1853).

== Later career ==
Fergusson was a member of the International Observer Team (1968–1969) during the Nigerian Civil War, founding chair of the Scottish Trust for the Physically Disabled from 1971, chair of the British Council 1972–1976, Lord High Commissioner to the General Assembly of the Church of Scotland 1973 and 1974, and Honorary Colonel of the Black Watch 1969–1976.

He was created a life peer on 10 July 1972 as Baron Ballantrae, of Auchairne in the County of Ayrshire and The Bay of Islands in New Zealand and made a Knight of the Thistle (KT) in 1974.

Lord Ballantrae served as chancellor of the University of St Andrews from 1973 until his death in 1980.

== Memorial scholarship ==
The Bernard Fergusson Memorial Scholarship was established in 1982 by the late Maori Queen, Dame Te Atairangikaahu, from a fund raised on her behalf in memory of Fergusson, as he was a particular friend of the Tainui people.

The purpose of the award is to assist a member of the Tainui Tribal Confederation resident in the Tainui Maori Trust Board area to enrol as an undergraduate student in the University of Waikato, who but for the award, might otherwise not be able to attend the university.

Owing to his relationship with Tainui, a Ngāruawāhia primary school, Te Kura Kaupapa o Bernard Fergusson, was named after him in 1966. Over the years, many students from the school would go on to receive the memorial scholarship.

== Honours and awards ==
Knight of the Order of the Thistle (KT)	30 November 1974
Knight Grand Cross of the Order of St Michael and St George (GCMG)	3 September 1962
Knight Grand Cross of the Royal Victorian Order (GCVO)	11 February 1963
Companion of the Distinguished Service Order (DSO)	5 August 1943 (Burma)
Officer of the Order of the British Empire (OBE)	King's Birthday Honours, 8 June 1950
Knight of the Order of St John (KStJ)	1961
General Service Medal	with 3 clasps
1939–1945 Star	
Africa Star	
Burma Star	
Defence Medal	
War Medal 1939–1945	with MiD
Queen Elizabeth II Coronation Medal	1953

== Arms ==
Coat of arms of Bernard Fergusson, Baron Ballantrae
Notes The arms of Bernard Fergusson consist of: Crest Issuing out of a mullet Argent a bee on a thistle Proper. Escutcheon Quarterly: 1st grandquarter Azure, a buckle Argent between three boars' heads couped Or armed and langued gules (Fergusson of Kilkerran) 2nd grandquarter, counterquartered; 1st and 4th Argent, an eagle displayed Sable beaked and membered Gules (Ramsay); 2nd and 3rd Gules, a chevron between three fleurs de lis Or (Broun of Colston): 3rd grandquarter, counterquartered; 1st and 4th Or, a lion rampant couped at all joints Gules within a double tressure flory counter flory Azure (Maitland); 2nd and 3rd Argent, a shakefork Sable (Cunningham of Glencairn): 4th grandquarter Or, on a saltire Azure nine lozenges of the first, on a bordure of the second eight mullets and as many boars' heads erased alternately Argent (Dalrymple of New Hailes): the whole within a bordure Argent for difference. Supporters Dexter, a soldier of the 42nd Highlanders, the Black Watch (The Royal Highland Regiment), attired in the full dress uniform of that regiment, including sporran and the feature bonnet as worn in the early 20th century; sinister, a Maori chieftain attired about the waist in a korowai (or mat) Argent, embellished with strings Sable, and over his left shoulder another korowai Or, also embellished with strings Sable, and embroidered Sable and Gules, two huia feathers in his hair, his face tattooed, a kuru (greenstone pendant) suspended from his dexter ear, his sinister hand grasping the shaft, and his dexter hand the tuft, of a taiaha (spear) held in bend sinister, point downwards Proper. Motto Dulcius ex asperis

== Bibliography ==
- Eton Portrait (1937) London: John Miles Ltd.
- One More River to Cross (1943) London: Collins
- Beyond the Chindwin (1945) London: Collins; (also) Barnsley: Pen & Sword Military (2009) ISBN 1-84884-037-3
- Lowland Soldier (1945) London: Collins (verse)
- The Wild Green Earth (1946) London: Collins
- The Black Watch and the King's Enemies (1950) London: Collins; (also) Derby: Pilgrim Press (1974) ISBN 0-900594-27-6
- Rupert of the Rhine (1952) London: Collins
- The Rare Adventure (1954) London: Collins
- The Business of War: The War Narrative of Major-General Sir John Kennedy (1957) (editor) London: Hutchinson
- The Watery Maze: The Story of Combined Operations (1961) London: Collins
- Wavell: Portrait of a Soldier (1961) London: Collins
- Return to Burma (1962) London: Collins
- The Trumpet in the Hall 1930–1958 (1970) London: Collins ISBN 978-0-00-211825-5
- Captain John Niven (1972) London: Collins ISBN 0-00-192148-7
- Hubble-Bubble (1978) London: Collins ISBN 0-00-211378-3 (light verse)
- Travel Warrant (1979) London: Collins ISBN 0-00-216792-1

Government offices
Preceded by The Viscount Cobham	Governor-General of New Zealand; 1962–1967	Succeeded by Sir Arthur Porritt
Academic offices
Preceded by The 14th Duke of Hamilton	Chancellor of the University of St Andrews; 1973–1980	Succeeded by Kenneth Dover
