= Colyer-Fergusson baronets =

Extinct baronetcy in the Baronetage of the United Kingdom

Escutcheon of the Colyer-Fergusson baronets of Spitalhaugh

The Colyer-Fergusson baronetcy, of Spitalhaugh in the County of Peebles and of George Street in the parish of St George Hanover Square in the County of Middlesex, was a title in the Baronetage of the United Kingdom. It was created on 23 January 1866 for the Scottish surgeon William Fergusson. The second Baronet served as Vice-Lieutenant of Peeblesshire. The third Baronet assumed the additional surname of Colyer in 1890 and served as high sheriff of Kent in 1906. The title became extinct on the death of the fourth Baronet in 2004.

== Colyer-Fergusson (formerly Fergusson) baronets, of Spitalhaugh (1866) ==
- Sir William Fergusson, 1st Baronet (1808–1877)
- Sir James Ranken Fergusson, 2nd Baronet (1835–1924)
- Sir Thomas Colyer Colyer-Fergusson, 3rd Baronet (1865–1951)
- Sir James Herbert Hamilton Colyer-Fergusson, 4th Baronet (1917–2004)
