= Evelyn Gardens =

Garden square in Chelsea, London

Coordinates: 51°29′18.73″N 0°10′45.87″W

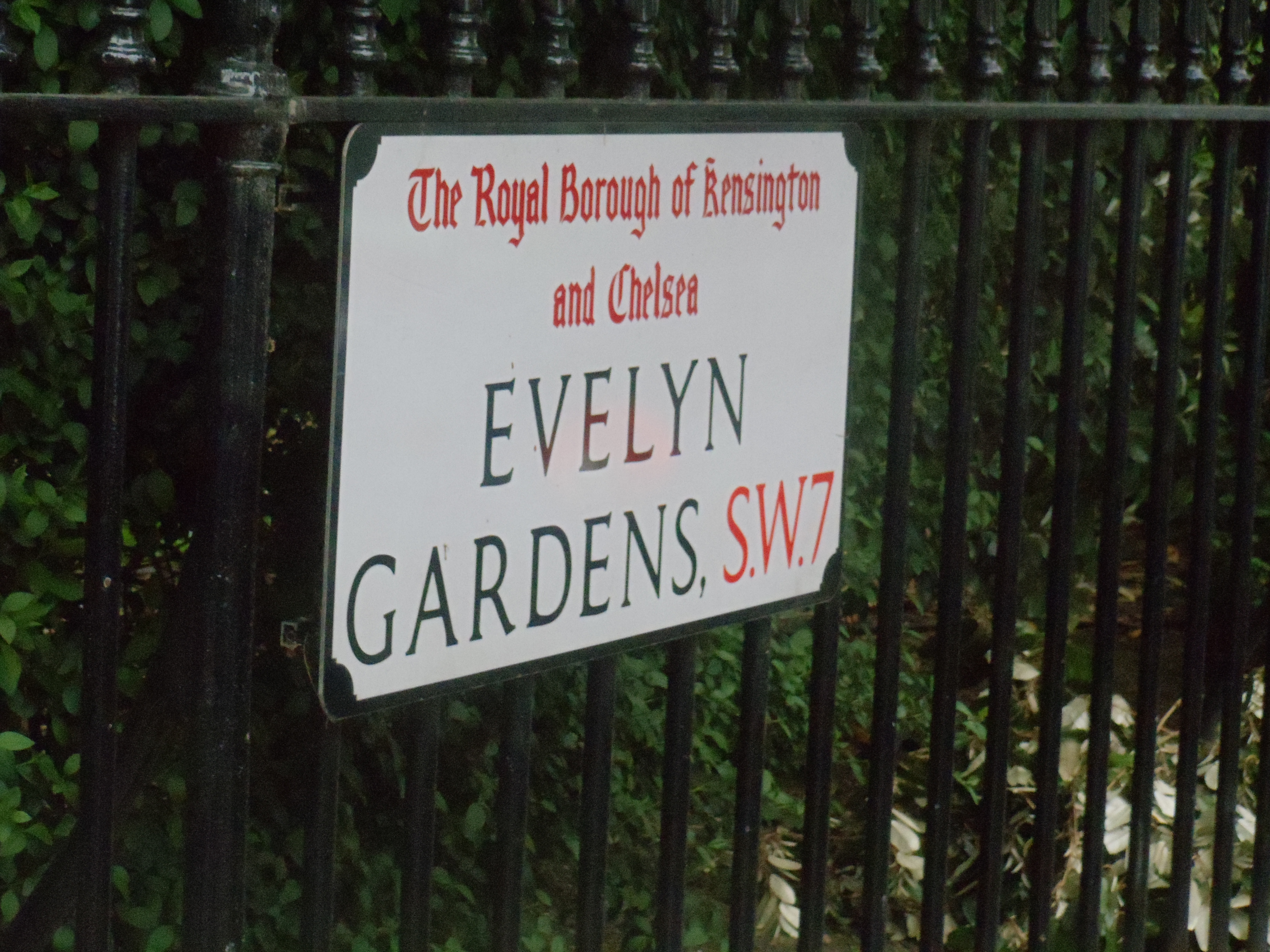
Evelyn Gardens signage

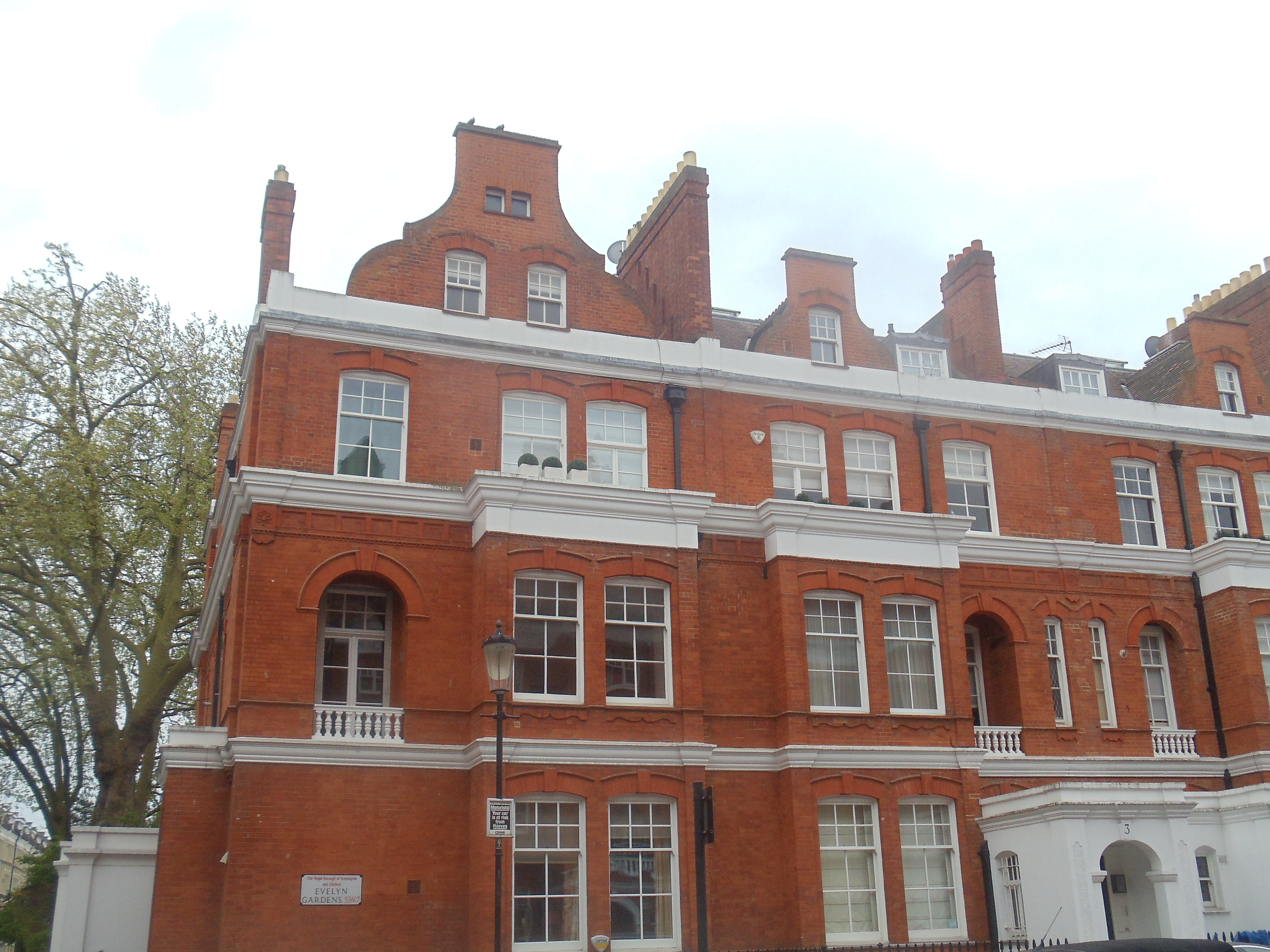
A building on Evelyn Gardens Square

Evelyn Gardens is a garden square in Chelsea, London, England.

== Location ==
The square is to the north-west of Fulham Road, and Roland Gardens, comes off the north-west corner of the square.

== History ==
The land belonged to Sir Charles James Freake. After his death in 1884, his widow, Lady Freake, and banker Charles Townshend Murdoch, hired C. A. Daw and Son to erect buildings around a garden square. It was named in honour of William John Evelyn. Construction began in 1886, and it was completed in 1896.

Philip Norman, an artist, was the first owner of 45 Evelyn Gardens.

Charles Digby Harrod, the owner of Harrods, lived at 31 Evelyn Gardens from 1888 to 1894.

Vernon Kell, who served as the founding Director-General of MI5 from 1909 to 1940, lived at 67 Evelyn Gardens.

Imperial College London maintains two halls of residence for their students on the square: Fisher Hall at 12-30 Evelyn Gardens and Bernard Sunley Hall at 40-44 Evelyn Gardens.
