= Thomas Holland (translator) =

English Calvinist scholar and theologian (1549–1612)

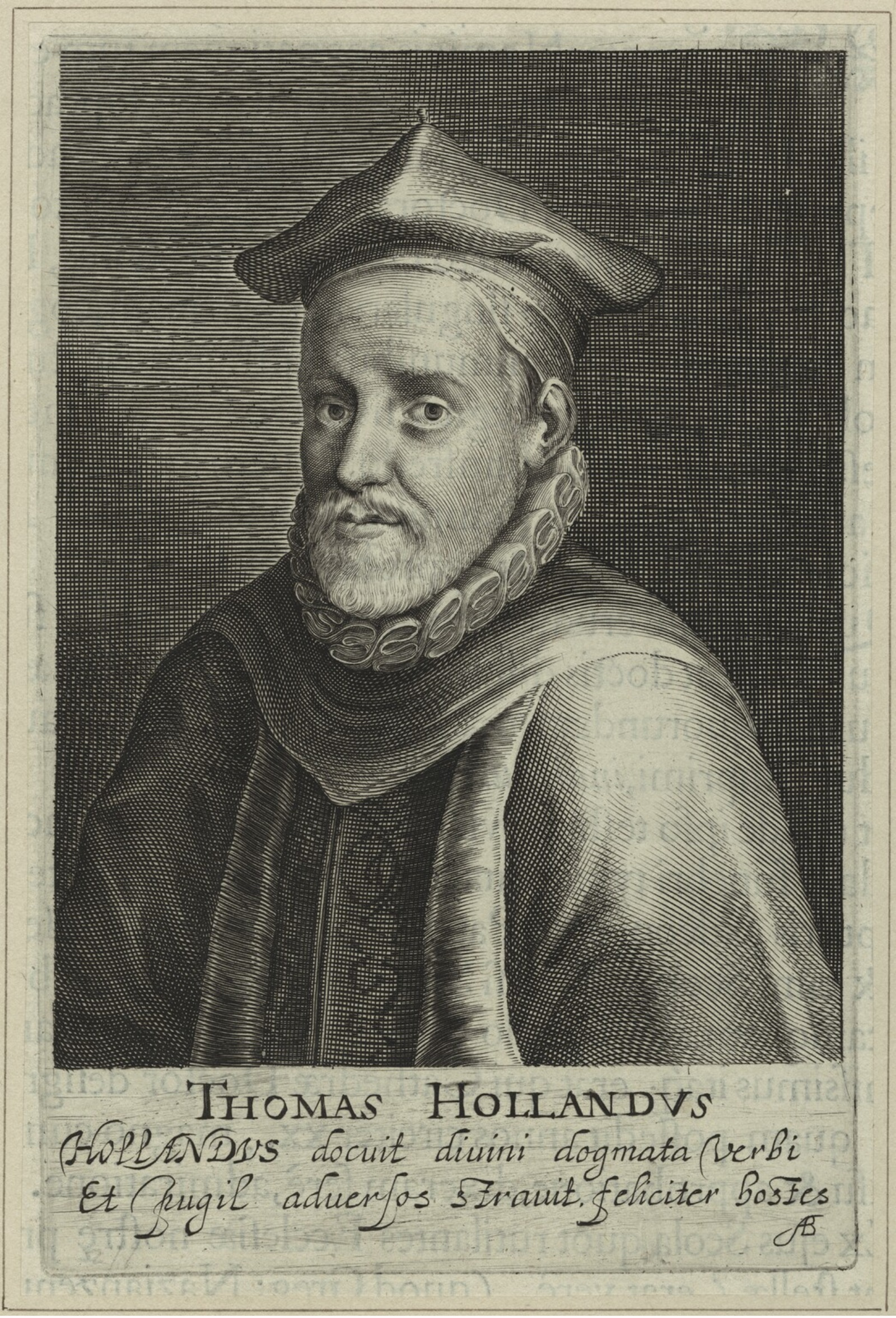
- Born: c.1549 Ludlow
- Died: 17 March 1612; Oxford
- Known for: Translator of the King James Bible Robert Dudley's personal chaplain. Skilled disputant. "An Apollos of the Scriptures."
- Parent: John Holland
- Relatives: Anne Gunter

Thomas Holland (1549 – 17 March 1612) was an English Calvinist scholar and theologian, and one of the translators of the King James Version of the Bible.

== Early life ==
Born in Ludlow, Shropshire, in 1549, son of John Holland, younger brother of William Holland (1525 – 1590) of Burwarton, a village located ten miles north east of Ludlow. Often confused with his cousin Thomas (1550- 1612), son of William, having the same name and being very close is age; the two even died the same year but six months apart. Thomas son of William was the heir to the Burwarton estate (as seen in the Shropshire Visitation of 1623) and was buried on 10 September 1612 in Stottesden, Shropshire, whereas Thomas son of John was a minor celebrity of his day and was buried on 26 March 1612 in Oxford.

== Oxford and the Netherlands ==
Holland first moved to Oxford in 1569 to start his degree. He graduated with a Bachelor of Arts from Exeter College, Oxford after just a year in 1570, being described as a "prodigy" as his acquisition of knowledge was profound. He was elected a chaplain-fellow of Balliol College, Oxford 3 years later in 1573 and gaining his Master's degree in 1575. He became a Bachelor of Divinity in 1582 then a Doctor of Divinity in 1584. From 1585 to 1587 he left Oxford to serve as personal chaplain to Robert Dudley, 1st Earl of Leicester, who was appointed governor of the Netherlands. Dudley, who was an ardent Protestant, utilized Holland in maintaining religious rigor among the troops during the two-year campaign which ended without great success and few battle engagements. For his service to Dudley, Holland was graciously rewarded by Queen Elizabeth I.

Returning to Oxford, Holland was appointed Regius Professor of Divinity in 1589 and a canon of Salisbury Cathedral in 1590. He became rector of St. Nicholas Church, Rotherfield Greys, Oxfordshire in 1591 and from 1592 he served as Rector of Exeter College. A notable protégé of Holland's was the later Bishop of Worcester, John Prideaux.

== Family life ==
Holland married Susan Gunter on 22 July 1593 in All Saints' Church and had six children, three sons and three daughters, all christened in North Moreton (then in Berkshire) between 1594 and 1601:

- Anne (b. 1594) named after Thomas' mother in law, Anne Gunter. She married Dr. John Whetcombe, vicar of Maiden Newton, Dorsetshire and former pupil of Thomas'.
- William (b. 1595) Matriculated into Exeter College, Oxford 22 November 1611 aged 16 [6]. He became a captain in the service of Charles I.
- Brian (b. 1597) named after Thomas' father in law, Brian Gunter of North Moreton. BA from Exeter College, Oxford 17 December 1621, MA 6 July 1627 [6]. Became a minister and moved to Long Wittenham. Later in life he became father to Brian Holland (b. 1650- d.1729) who was matriculated into Magdalen College, Oxford 22 June 1667 aged 17. Brian Jr was a chorister from 1660 to 1668, a clerk from 1668 to 1671, rector of Hitcham, Buckinghamshire, canon of Sarum from 1672 and rector of Lamyatt from 1704 [6]. He married Mary Keene on 5 June 1672 and became father to Daniel Holland (b. 1675- d.1740).
- Edward (b. 1599). Matriculated into Corpus Christi College, Oxford 27 October 1615 aged 15. He gained his BA 2 December 1619 then later became a Doctor of Philosophy [6].
- Marie (b. 1600) Thomas' second youngest daughter, Marie, was baptised on 14 July.
- Susanna (b. 1601). She married John Vernon, Rector of Hanbury, Worcestershire.

== Bible translating ==
In June 1604, 54 of England's most prominent linguists and scholars were commissioned into six groups to translate the Bible into English. Holland took a very prominent part in the translation of the Bible, as a member of the "First Oxford Company", responsible for the translation of the books of the Old Testament prophets from Isaiah to Malachi, in the project to create an Authorized Version of the Bible (King James Version) for reading in the churches. After it was published 2 May 1611, Holland died 10½ months later, aged 63. He had stoutly resisted the "popish innovations" which Richard Bancroft and William Laud strove too successfully to introduce at Oxford.

Holland is interred in the chancel of St Mary's Church, Oxford. One of his portraits is in the Hope collection in the Bodleian Library, and a fine engraving in Henry Holland's Herωologia Anglica. Another of his portraits, which is in the National Portrait Gallery, London, reads: "Hollandus docuit divini dogmata verbi et pugil adversos stravit feliciter hostes," which translates roughly as "Holland taught the teachings of God's Word and fought against enemies, successfully throwing them down."

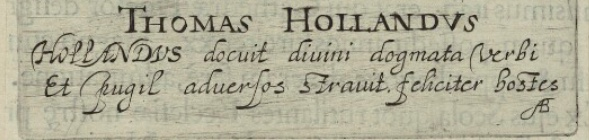

== The Bewitching of Anne Gunter ==
It was during his time translating that Thomas was involved in a case of witchcraft in North Moreton brought by his sister in law, Anne Gunter, and her father, Brian Gunter, against local women who it was said had cursed Anne Gunter. The case went to the Star Chamber and Thomas was called as an expert witness. He refused to believe that Anne was possessed by the devil and that she could it was claimed read with her eyes closed. It was eventually discovered to be the invention of Anne's father who had a vendetta against a local family.

== Works ==
Thomas' works include:

- 'Oratio habita cum Henricus Episc. Sarisburiensis [i.e. Henry Cotton] Gradum Doctoris susceperit,' Oxford, 1599, 4to.
- 'Πανηγυρίς D. Elizabethæ Reginæ. "A Sermon preached at Pauls in London the 17 of November, 1599. Whereunto is adioyned an Apologeticall Discourse for observing the 17 of November yeerely in the form of an Holy-Day," Oxford (by Joseph Barnes), 1601

== Sources ==
- Alumni Oxonienses, 1500–1714, Oxford: Parker and Co. (1888–1892).
- Lee, Sidney, ed. (1891). "Holland, Thomas (d.1612)" . Dictionary of National Biography. Vol. 27. London: Smith, Elder & Co.

Academic offices
Preceded by Lawrence Humphrey	Regius Professor of Divinity at Oxford; 1589–1612	Succeeded by Robert Abbot
Preceded by Thomas Glasier	Rector of Exeter College, Oxford; 1592–1612	Succeeded by John Prideaux
