= Woodstock Town Hall =

Municipal building in Woodstock, Oxfordshire, England

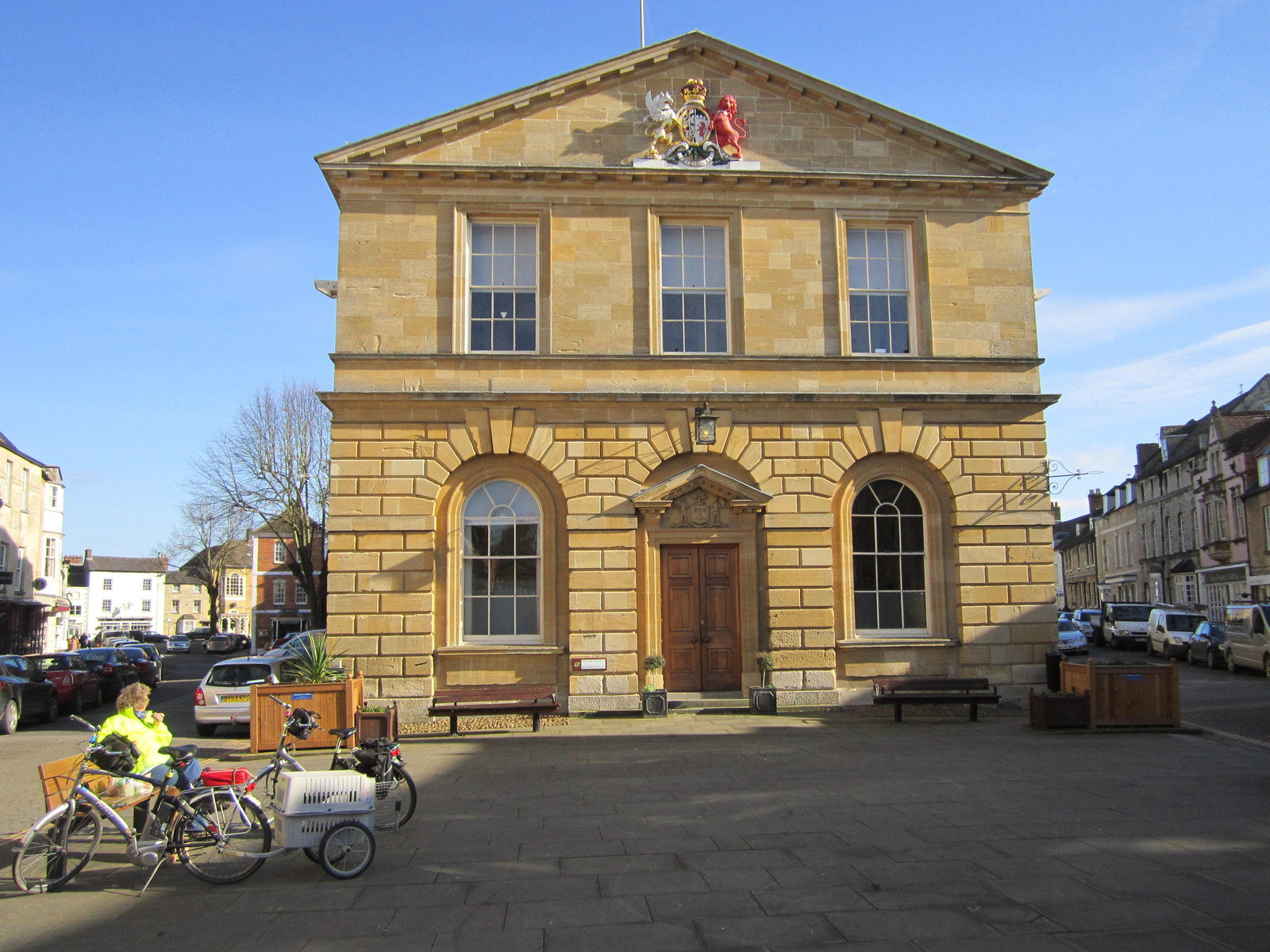
- Woodstock Town Hall

- Shown in Oxfordshire
- 51.8475°N 1.3558°W
- Location: Market Place, Woodstock

History
- Built: 1767

Site notes
- Architect: Sir William Chambers
- Architectural style: Neoclassical style

Listed Building – Grade II
- Official name: Town Hall
- Designated: 18 October 1949
- Reference no.: 1203847

Woodstock Town Hall is a municipal building in the Market Place in Woodstock, Oxfordshire, England. The building, which is used as a community events venue and the headquarters of Woodstock Town Council, is a Grade II listed building.

== History ==
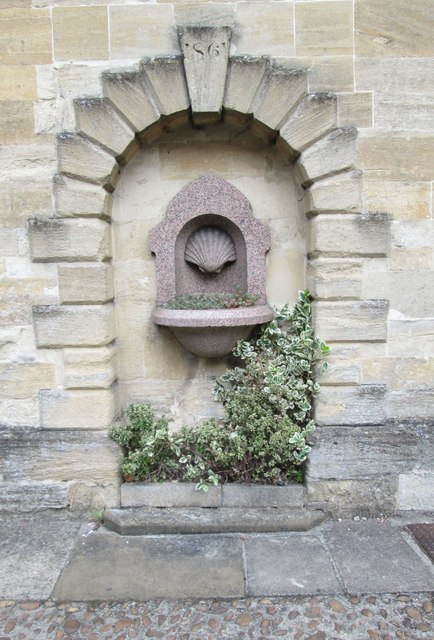
The drinking fountain on the south elevation

The first municipal building in the town was a medieval guildhall on the south side of Market Street which dated back at least to the 15th century. It was a two-storey building which incorporated a lock-up for petty criminals and which was surmounted by a small tower with a clock and a bell. By 1757, the old guildhall had become very dilapidated and it was demolished. In the early 1760s, the lord of the manor, George Spencer, 4th Duke of Marlborough, approved plans for a new town hall: the site chosen had been occupied by an ancient market cross. The foundation stone for the new building was laid by the duke in March 1766. It was designed by Sir William Chambers in the neoclassical style, built by John Hooper in ashlar stone at a cost of £1,100 and was completed in 1767.

The design involved a symmetrical main frontage with three bays facing west onto the Market Place. The ground floor, which was rusticated, featured three round headed openings for access to the market hall, while the first floor featured three sash windows with architraves. The front elevation was surmounted by a modillioned pediment. Internally, the principal rooms were the market hall on the ground floor, and the main assembly hall and the council chamber on the first floor. The building also accommodated facilities for the local horse-drawn fire engine and a new lock-up for petty criminals. The pediment was enhanced when the coat of arms of the George Spencer, 4th Duke of Marlborough was installed in the tympanum in 1768.

In the second half of the 19th century the county magistrates held hearings in the building and, in 1861, a drinking fountain was installed on the south elevation of the building at the expense of John Spencer-Churchill, 7th Duke of Marlborough in appreciation of the efforts of the people of town in extinguishing a major fire at Blenheim Palace earlier that year. The suffragette, Jane Ronniger, gave a speech advocating votes for women in the town hall in March 1875. The borough council, which met in the town hall, was reformed under the Municipal Corporations Act 1883.

In 1898, the ground floor openings were infilled to a design by George Castle to celebrate the Diamond Jubilee of Queen Victoria; a doorway flanked by pilasters supporting an open pediment was inserted in the central opening and round headed windows were inserted in the outer openings. These alterations allowed the creation of a mayor's parlour and a library at the front of the building on the ground floor. The town hall continued to serve as the headquarters of the borough council for much of the 20th century but ceased to be the local seat of government when the enlarged West Oxfordshire District Council which was formed in 1974. It subsequently became the headquarters of Woodstock Town Council.

In the 1990s, a series of wall hangings were by created by the Woodstock Broderers for the main assembly hall, and, in the 21st century, the building became an approved venue for weddings and civil partnership ceremonies.

Works of art in the town hall include a portrait by Sir Joshua Reynolds of George Spencer, 4th Duke of Marlborough, a portrait by an unknown artist of John Spencer-Churchill, 7th Duke of Marlborough and a portrait by Tennyson Cole of Charles Spencer-Churchill, 9th Duke of Marlborough, as well as a portrait by James Saxon of the Scottish teacher, William Fordyce Mavor.

The building was used to depict a Nazi headquarters in the 1979 film Hanover Street starring Harrison Ford.
