= Woodstock, Oxfordshire =

Market town in West Oxfordshire, England

Coordinates: 51°50′52″N 1°21′15″W

Woodstock
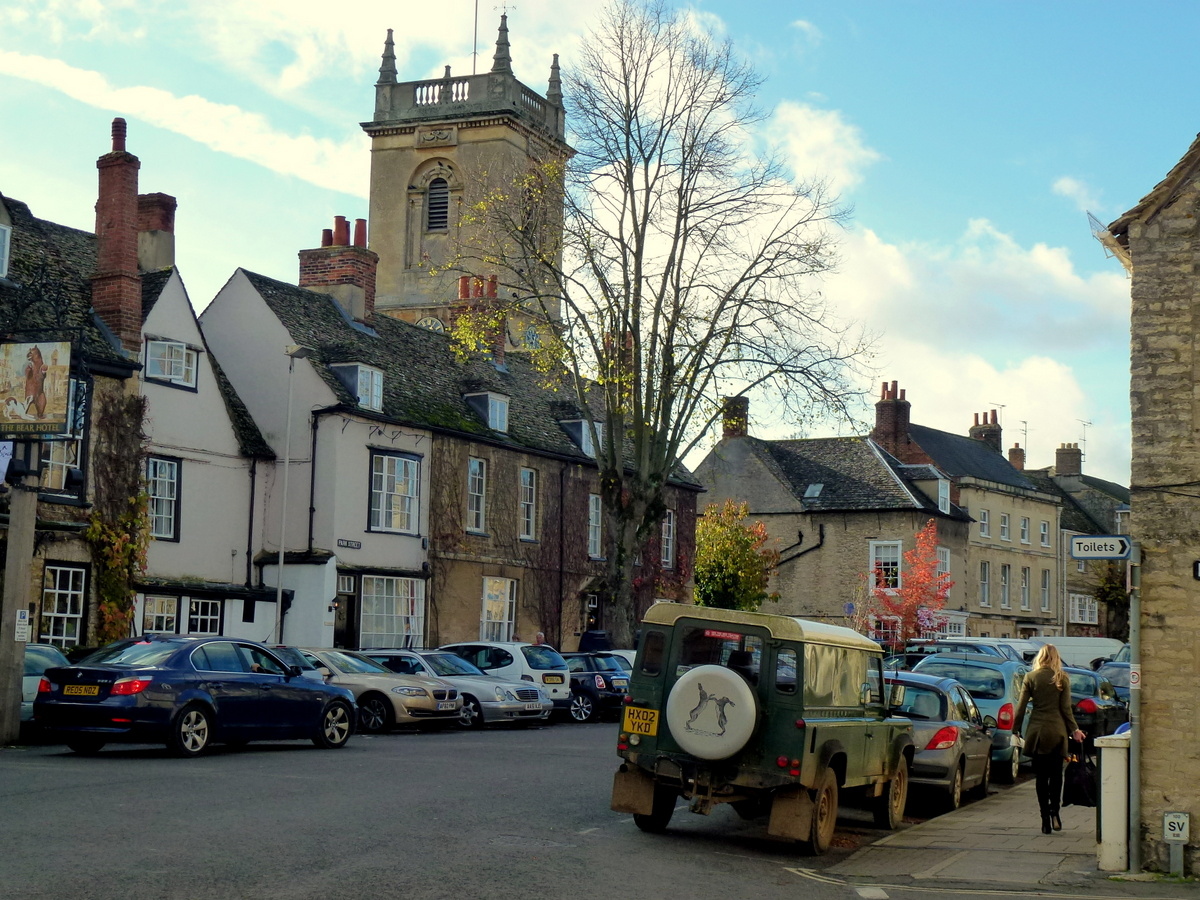
- Woodstock town centre

- Location within Oxfordshire
- Population: 3,521 (2021 census)
- OS grid reference: SP4416
  - London: 62 miles (100 km)
- Civil parish: Woodstock
- District: West Oxfordshire
- Shire county: Oxfordshire
- Region: South East
- Country: England
- Sovereign state: United Kingdom
- Post town: Woodstock
- Postcode district: OX20
- Dialling code: 01993
- Police: Thames Valley
- Fire: Oxfordshire
- Ambulance: South Central
- UK Parliament: Bicester and Woodstock
- Website: Woodstock Town Council

Woodstock is a market town and civil parish, 8 miles (13 km) north-west of Oxford in West Oxfordshire in the county of Oxfordshire, England. The 2021 census recorded a parish population of 3,521, up from the previous 3,100 in 2011.

Blenheim Palace, a UNESCO World Heritage Site, is next to Woodstock, in the parish of Blenheim. Winston Churchill was born in the palace in 1874 and buried in the nearby village of Bladon. Edward, elder son of King Edward III and heir apparent, was born in Woodstock Manor on 15 June 1330. In his lifetime he was commonly called Edward of Woodstock, but is known today as the Black Prince. In the reign of Queen Mary I, her half-sister Elizabeth was imprisoned in the gatehouse of Woodstock Manor.

The River Glyme, in a steep valley, divides the town into New and Old Woodstock. The town has two main suburbs: Hensington to the south and east of the town centre, and Old Woodstock to the north.

Woodstock Town Hall was built in 1766 to designs by Sir William Chambers. The almshouses were built in 1798 on behalf of Caroline, duchess of Marlborough. Chaucer's House was once home to Chancellor of England, Thomas Chaucer, thought to be the son of the poet Geoffrey Chaucer. The Church of England parish church of St Mary Magdalene has a Norman doorway and a turret clock that John Briant of Hertford made in 1792. The Oxfordshire Museum, the county museum of Oxfordshire, occupies a large historic house, Fletcher's House, in the centre of Woodstock. The museum has a garden containing works of art and a Dinosaur Garden with a full-size replica of a Megalosaurus. The town has a nursery, primary school and a secondary school, Marlborough School, and the parish is home to Oxford School of Drama. The mayor is Anne Grant.

== History ==
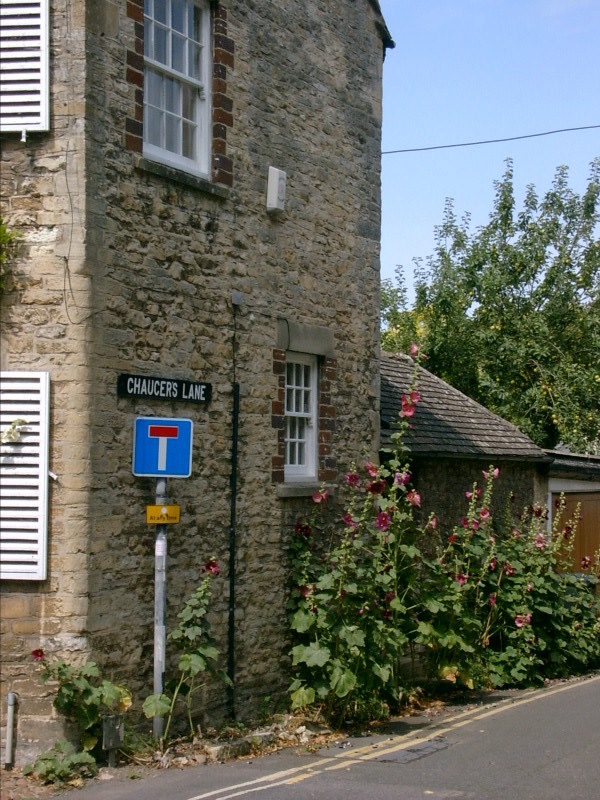
Chaucers Lane, Woodstock

The name Woodstock is Old English in origin, meaning a "clearing in the woods". The Saxon name was Wudestoc, i.e. a woody place. The Domesday Book of 1086 describes Woodstock (Wodestock, Wodestok, Wodestole) as a royal forest. Æthelred the Unready, king of England, is said to have held an assembly at Woodstock at which he issued a legal code now known as IX Æthelred. Henry I may have kept a menagerie in the park. Woodstock was the scene of Henry II's courtship of Rosamund Clifford (Fair Rosamund). The market of the town was established when Henry II gave Woodstock a market charter in 1179. The Bear Hotel in Park Street opposite The Oxfordshire Museum dates from the 13th century.

Near the village was Woodstock Palace, a residence that was popular with several English kings throughout the medieval period. The building was destroyed in the English Civil War. 60 years later the palace remains were cleared for the building of Blenheim Palace. From the 16th century the town prospered by making gloves. In the 17th century the town was altered greatly, when the 1st Duke of Marlborough became a permanent resident. The town had a successful fine steelwork industry by 1720 and by 1742 its products were of high enough quality to be considered viable diplomatic gifts. By the end of the 18th century this had developed into cut steel jewellery. Today it is largely dependent on tourists, many of whom visit Blenheim Palace.

=== Elizabeth I ===
When Thomas Wyatt led an uprising in 1554 to depose Queen Mary I and put Princess Elizabeth on the throne in her place, Elizabeth was imprisoned in a lodge in Woodstock as a precaution. The lodge was used because the now lost Woodstock Palace or manor house was too dilapidated to house her. A survey in 1551 reported that "the mansion... for many years past hath been decayed." While imprisoned, Elizabeth wrote a poem. "Much suspected by [of] me, None proved can be." She was released in April 1555 after nearly a year in captivity.

=== Bell-foundry ===
By 1626 James Keene, who had a bell-foundry in Bedford, had started one in Woodstock. Until 1640 another member of the family, Humphrey Keene, was a bell-founder with him. James died in 1654 and was succeeded by his son Richard. Richard Keene apparently closed the Woodstock foundry in the 1680s but continued casting bells at Royston, Hertfordshire, until 1703.

Numerous parish churches still have one or more bells cast by the Keenes, including at Asthall, Bloxham, Cassington, Charlton-on-Otmoor, Chastleton, Chesterton, Duns Tew, Eynsham, Garsington, Islip, Kiddington, Merton, Milton, North Moreton, Oddington, Rousham, Sandford St Martin, Stanton Harcourt, Steeple Aston, Steeple Barton, Stratton Audley, Tackley, Towersey and Woodeaton in Oxfordshire, Stowe and Water Stratford in Buckinghamshire, Stanton in Gloucestershire, Middleton Cheney in Northamptonshire and Martley in Worcestershire.

=== Old railway station ===
The town previously had a railway station, Blenheim and Woodstock railway station, initially privately run by the Duke of Marlborough until 1897 when it became part of the Great Western Railway. The final train to run on the line departed on 27 February 1954. The western end of the line, leading to the old station, is now a residential road, "New Road". The part of the line on the eastern edge of the town now forms a nature area called the "OWL" (Old Woodstock Line) Nature Reserve.

== Blenheim Palace ==
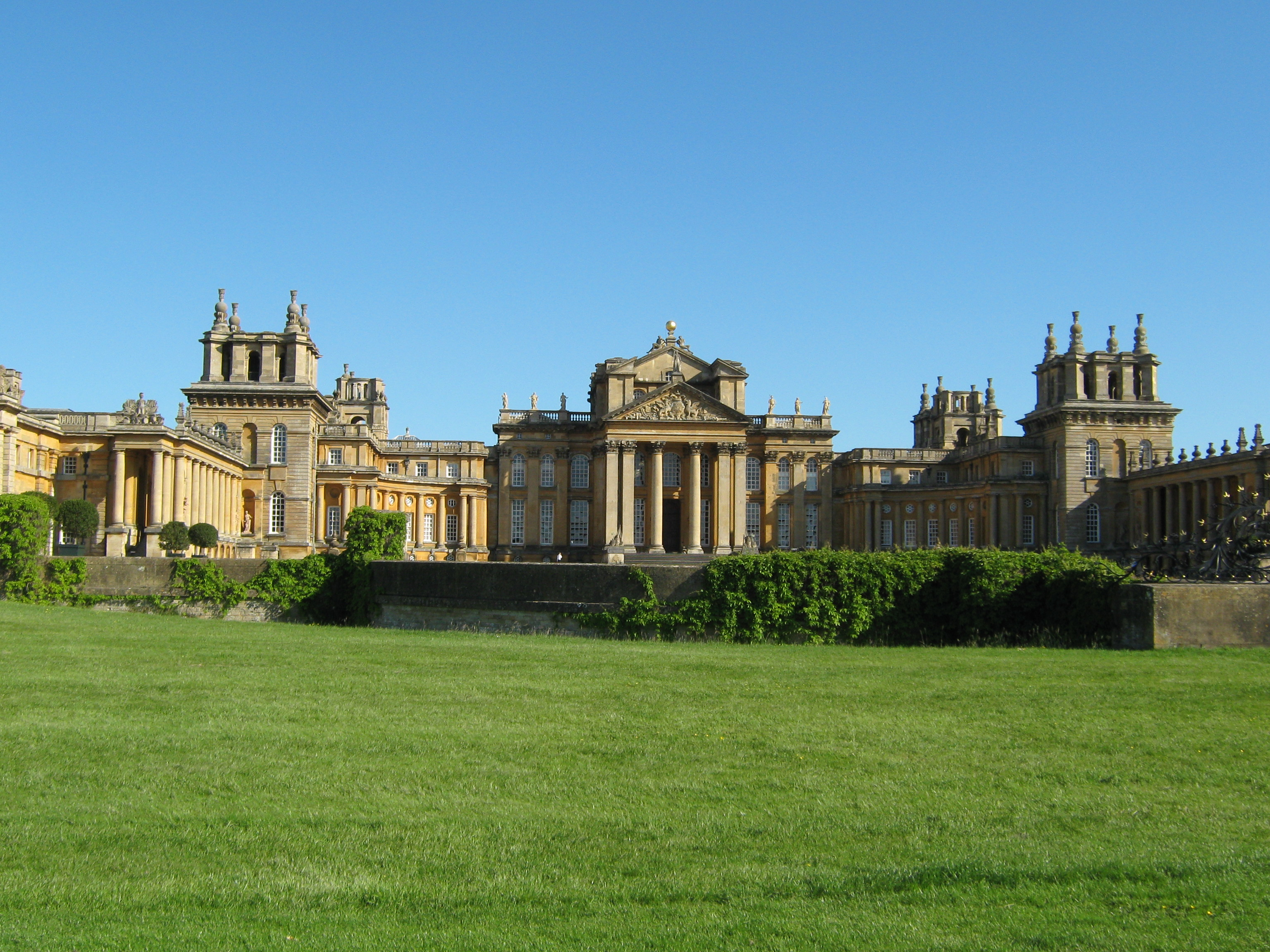
South front of Blenheim Palace

The Palace was designed by John Vanbrugh, in a heavy Italo-Corinthian style. It was designated to John Churchill, the first Duke of Marlborough. Most of the palace was paid for by the nation. Churchill had been given the manor in perpetuity in honour of his victories over the French and the Bavarians at the Battle of Blenheim in 1704, during the War of the Spanish Succession. The original manor, mostly ruined, was demolished as part of the project. In 1987, Blenheim Palace was inscribed as a UNESCO World Heritage Site, recognised both for its influence on 18th- and 19th-century architecture and landscape design, and as a national monument honouring the Duke of Marlborough, whose role is also reflected in the palace's interior decoration.

The greater part of the art treasures and curios were sold off in 1886, as was the great library collected by Charles Spencer, Earl of Sunderland, the son-in-law of the first Duke of Marlborough, in 1881. The magnificent park contains Fair Rosamund's Well, near which stood her bower. On the summit of a hill stands a column commemorating the duke. Blenheim Park forms a separate parish.

Blenheim Palace was the hosting venue for the 4th European Political Community Summit on 18 July 2024.

== Governance ==
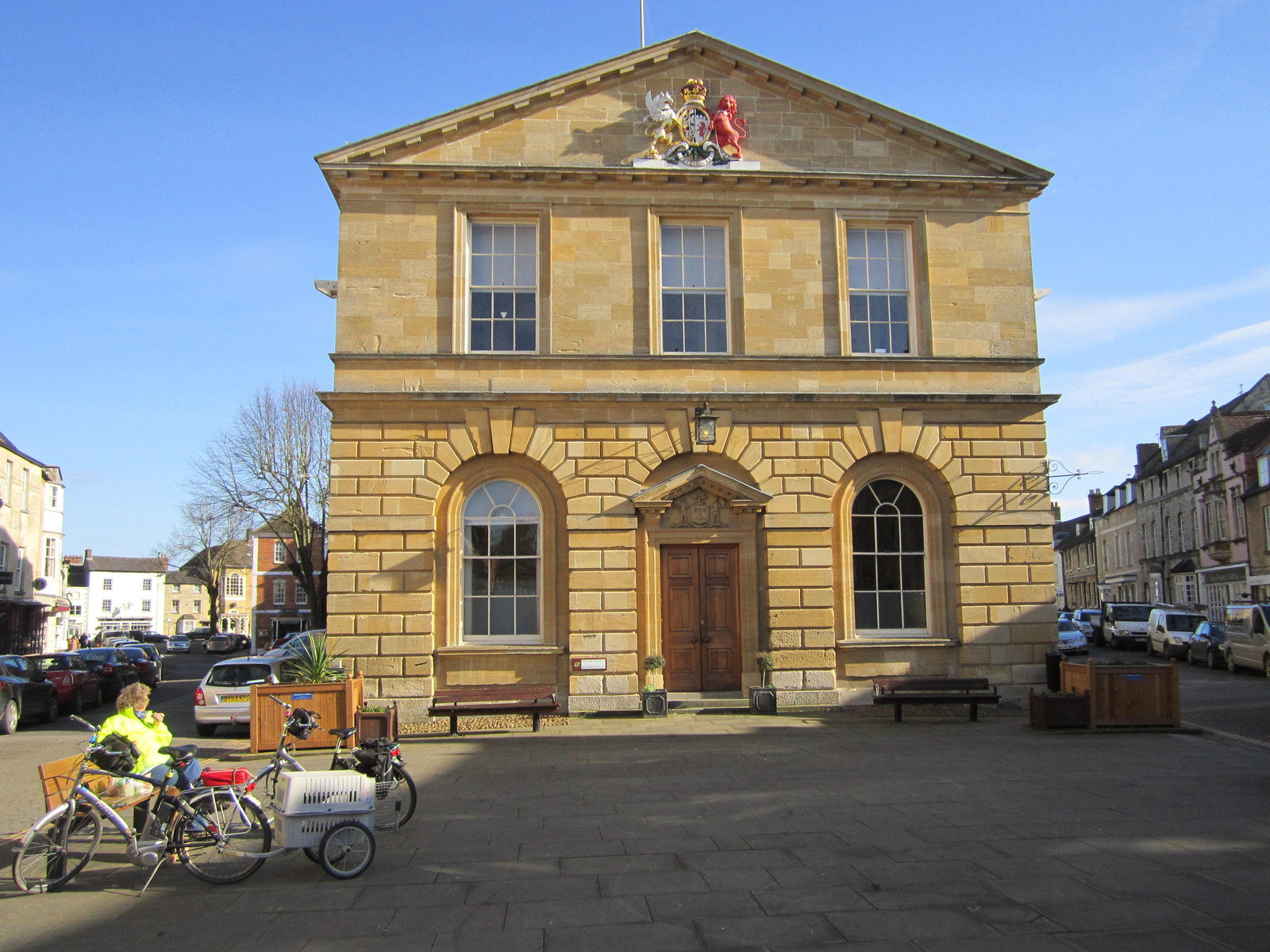
Woodstock Town Hall

There are three tiers of local government covering Woodstock, at civil parish (town), district, and county level: Woodstock Town Council, West Oxfordshire District Council, and Oxfordshire County Council. The town council is based at the Town Hall in the Market Place.

=== Administrative history ===
The original settlement of Woodstock, now known as Old Woodstock, is to the north of the River Glyme. It was historically a small hamlet at the southern end of the parish of Wootton. The later town appears to have been laid out as a planned settlement in the 12th century on a previously unoccupied site in the parish of Bladon, south of the Glyme. The town was officially called New Woodstock until the 19th century. New Woodstock subsequently came to be treated as a separate civil parish from Bladon.

In the Hundred Rolls of 1279 Woodstock is described as a vill, but a burgess is alluded to in the same document, and it returned two members to parliament as a borough in 1302 and 1305. The earliest known municipal charter was that from Henry VI in 1453, establishing the vill of New Woodstock a free borough, with a merchant guild, and incorporating the burgesses under the title of the "Mayor and Commonalty of the Vill of New Woodstock." The Woodstock parliamentary borough was then exempted from sending representatives to parliament, but it subsequently resumed electing two members in the 16th century.

The borough was left unreformed when most boroughs across the country were standardised under the Municipal Corporations Act 1835. Government commissioners had concluded that the borough corporation had too few functions and the town was too small to justify the cost of reform. The borough corporation continued to exist, but did not qualify to take on any subsequent new local government powers. The Municipal Corporations Act 1883 directed that the remaining unreformed boroughs, including New Woodstock, would be abolished in 1886 unless they managed to secure a new charter converting them into a modern municipal borough. A new charter was granted in 1886; the reformed borough covered a larger area, also taking in Old Woodstock and part of the neighbouring parish of Hensington (formerly a hamlet in the parish of Bladon which had become a separate civil parish in 1866). The enlarged borough, which after the 1886 enlargement included both Old Woodstock and New Woodstock, was renamed Woodstock.

The borough of Woodstock was abolished in 1974 under the Local Government Act 1972. District-level functions passed to the new West Oxfordshire District Council. A successor parish called Woodstock was created covering the area of the abolished borough, with its parish council taking the name Woodstock Town Council.

== Media ==
Local news and television programmes are provided by BBC South and ITV Meridian. Television signals are received from the Oxford TV transmitter. Local radio stations are BBC Radio Oxford on 95.2 FM, Heart South on 102.6 FM, Greatest Hits Radio South (formerly Jack FM) on 106.4 FM and Witney Radio, a community based station which broadcast to the town on 90.2 FM. The town is served by the local newspaper, Woodstock and Bladon News.

== Sport and leisure ==
Woodstock has a Non-League football club, Woodstock Town, who play at New Road. At the start of the 2023–2024 season, Woodstock Town moved both senior sides playing into the Oxfordshire_Senior_Football_League. The town has Tennis Courts and a Bowling Green situated next to New Road Park. The town has a lido, next to The Marlborough School, which opens in the summer months.

== In popular culture ==
- Last Bus to Woodstock is a crime novel by Colin Dexter.
- "A Light on the Road to Woodstock" is a short story by Ellis Peters, telling how her detective monk, Cadfael, found his vocation as a Benedictine monk.

== Notable people ==
- Mary Brook, who wrote about prayer, was born here in about 1726. Her writing was published in several languages and editions.
- Economist, broadcaster and diplomat Peter Jay (1937–2024), lived in Woodstock, was a town councillor and was mayor in 2010.
- William Fordyce Mavor teacher, priest and compiler of educational books. First elected mayor of Woodstock in 1808, he went on to hold mayoral office in the town 10 times. Mavor Close, on the Barn Piece estate in Old Woodstock, is named after him.

== General and cited sources ==
- Aston, Michael; Bond, James (1976). The Landscape of Towns. Archaeology in the Field Series. London: J.M. Dent & Sons Ltd. pp. 94, 165, 171. ISBN 0-460-04194-0.
- Ballard, Adolphus (1896). Chronicles of the Royal Borough of Woodstock. Compiled From the Borough Records and Other Original Documents. Oxford: Alden & Co.
- Beeson, C.F.C. (1989) [1962]. A. V., Simcock (ed.). Clockmaking in Oxfordshire 1400–1850 (3rd ed.). Oxford: Museum of the History of Science. pp. 24, 73. ISBN 0-903364-06-9.
- Crossley, Alan; Elrington, C.R.; Baggs, A.P.; Blair, W.J.; Chance, Eleanor; Colvin, Christina; Cooper, Janet; Day, C.J.; Selwyn, Nesta; Townley, Simon C. (1990). A History of the County of Oxford. Victoria County History. Vol. 12: Wootton Hundred (South) including Woodstock. London: Oxford University Press for the Institute of Historical Research. pp. 254–267. ISBN 978-0-19722-774-9.
- Jenkins, S.C. (1987). The Woodstock Branch. Wild Swan Publications. ISBN 0-906867-51-7.
- Marshall, Edward (1873). The Early History of Woodstock Manor and Its Environs, in Bladon, Hensington, New Woodstock, Blenheim: With Later Notices. London & Oxford: James Parker & Co.
- Sherwood, Jennifer; Pevsner, Nikolaus (1974). Oxfordshire. The Buildings of England. Harmondsworth: Penguin Books. pp. 856–859. ISBN 0-14-071045-0.
