= Bear at Home =

Pub in North Moreton, Oxfordshire, England

Coordinates: 51.5997°N 1.1908°W

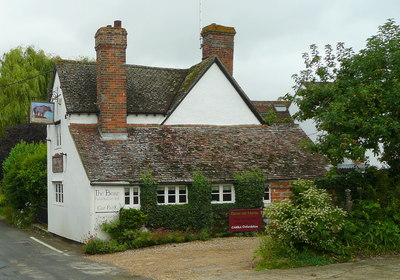
The Bear at Home, North Moreton

The Bear at Home (now the Bear Inn) is an English 16th-century public house in the South Oxfordshire village of North Moreton, near Wallingford. It retains many original 16th-century features, including timber-framed walls, inglenook fireplace and a well, and was extended in 1980 to allow it to serve food. As recently as 1930, there were four pubs in this small village, serving a population of about 400 people.
