= Anne Gunter =

Allegic English witchcraft victim

- Born: c.1584
- Died: 16??
- Known for: Claimed demonic possession
- Parent: Brian Gunter (1540–1628)
- Relatives: Prof. Thomas Holland

Anne Gunter (c.1584 – 16??) was an English woman who was thought to be possessed by a demon after she reputedly brought forth pins from several orifices. The accusations attracted the brief attention of James I of England. The case was championed by her father, Brian Gunter, who had previously killed two sons of the Gregory family during a game of football. Gunter accused three women, including Elizabeth Gregory, of witchcraft against his daughter Anne. The case was settled by the Star Chamber who found that her purported possession was her father's invention. It is claimed that Anne's misadventure is the best documented English witchcraft case.

== Life ==
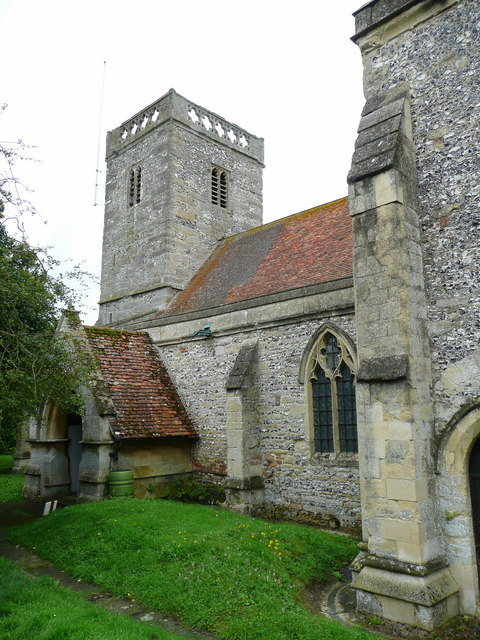
All Saints' Church in North Moreton in 2008

Anne Gunter was baptised in 1584 in Hungerford. She was the fifth and youngest child of Anne and Brian Gunter. Her father was the lay rector at North Moreton who fatally injured two yeomen named John and Richard Gregory during a football match in May 1598. A fight had broken out between John Fields and Richard Gregory where they "did... fall together by the ears." William Gunter, second son of Brian, intervened and was attacked by Richard and his brother John Gregory. Brian Gunter reached over the shoulders of the struggling men and struck the two Gregorys on the head with the pommel of his dagger. Both died "within a fortnight. This tragic event caused a bitter feud between the Gunters and the Gregorys.

Anne was first ill in the summer of 1604, and when the sickness returned in October of the same year, her malady was blamed on witchcraft. She reported a wide range of symptoms including vomiting and fits. She was said to bring forth pins in her vomit, in her water, and "downwards". She named three women as witches: Agnes Pepwell, her illegitimate daughter Mary, and Elizabeth Gregory, wife of yeoman farmer Walter Gregory and, on many accounts, the most unpopular woman in North Moreton. Agnes fled, but Mary and Elizabeth were tried for witchcraft at Abingdon in March 1605. Anne's case was investigated by academics. Her brother-in-law was Professor of Divinity Thomas Holland of Oxford University and called in the Professor of medicine Bartholomew Warner. On 1 March 1605, Elizabeth Gregory and Mary Pepwell were tried for witchcraft but not found guilty.

Brian Gunter was not convinced by the trial, and he obtained an audience with the King when his daughter failed to get better. King James saw her dance. She told him a physician had helped her with a talisman, a tablet which she wore as a necklace. The King referred the case to, Richard Bancroft, the Archbishop of Canterbury who gave the problem to Samuel Harsnett. Harsnett decided that there was no case.

In 1606 Harsnett and Richard Neile, Dean of Westminster, and possibly Bancroft started a case in the influential Star Chamber against Anne and her father. Evidence was taken from the aristocrat Sir Francis Stuart who had seen Anne in her fits. Neile received £300 for bringing witnesses to the court.

The Gunters had to answer charges of making vexatious accusations of witchcraft. Her brother-in-law, Thomas Holland, refused to believe that she was possessed by the devil as her father claimed. It was said that Anne could read with her eyes closed, but she failed to demonstrate this ability. Under examination, Anne admitted that the witchcraft idea was her father's invention. He was annoyed at the Gregory family and had persuaded his daughter to act out the symptoms of being cursed. He had given her various liquids to drink, including a mixture of sack (wine) and salad oil (sallet), as well as what was described as 'green water' to his daughter to induce her to vomit to add to the evidence against Elizabeth Gregory and her two supposed partners.

It is thought that the case became so high-profile because the clergy involved wanted to discredit those who gained from the belief in demonic possession by performing exorcisms. It is not known what happened to the Gunters as a result of the case, though it is likely that Anne, having been forced, was pardoned. This seems to be confirmed, given that James I wrote in October 160, that Anne had fallen in love with a servant of Archbishop Bancroft, Asheley, and that it was reciprocal. The couple planned to marry with royal blessing and a dowry provided by the monarch. Anne was said to be about to marry in 1605 and her father died in Oxford in 1628.
