= William Chambers (architect) =

British architect (1723–1796)

Sir William Chambers
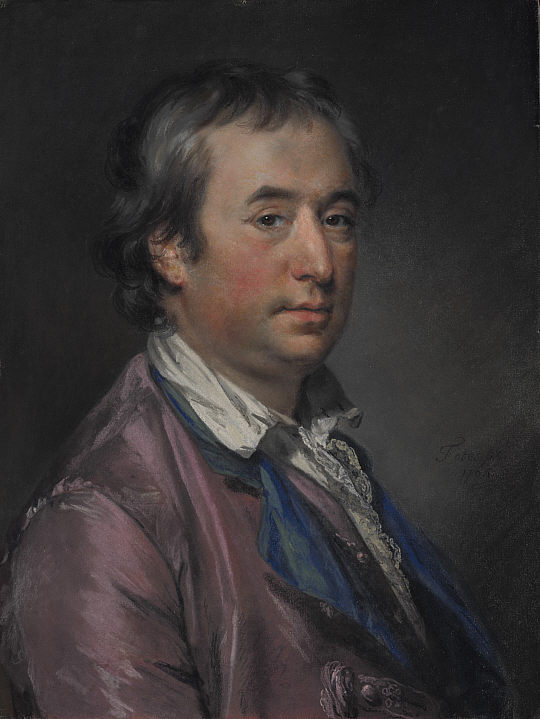
- Chambers, painted in 1764 by Frances Cotes
- Born: 23 February 1723; Gothenburg, Sweden
- Died: 10 March 1796 (aged 73); London, England
- Occupation: Architect
- Spouse: Catherine Moore (fl. 1752–1797)
- Children: Cornelia, Selina (who married Jamaican plantation owner William Innes), and Charlotte, as well as George and Lavinia
- Buildings: Casino at Marino; Dundas House (now the headquarters of the Royal Bank of Scotland); Dunmore Pineapple; Somerset House

Sir William Chambers (23 February 1723 – 10 March 1796) was a Swedish-born British architect. Among his best-known works are Somerset House, the Gold State Coach and the pagoda at Kew. Chambers was a founder member of the Royal Academy.

== Biography ==
William Chambers was born on 23 February 1723 in Gothenburg, Sweden, to a Scottish merchant father.

Between 1740 and 1749 he was employed by the Swedish East India Company making three voyages to China where he studied Chinese architecture and decoration. It was during his employment with the company that he befriended David af Sandeberg, director of the Swedish East India Company and nobleman, who subsequently married Chambers' sister, Maria.

He married Catherine Moore in Rome in 1752. Catherine's portrait was painted by Joshua Reynolds in Paris in 1752.

Returning to Europe, he studied architecture in Paris (with J. F. Blondel) and spent five years in Italy. Then, in 1755, he moved to London, where he established an architectural practice. In 1757, through a recommendation of Lord Bute, he was appointed architectural tutor to the Prince of Wales, later George III, and in 1766 also, along with Robert Adam, Architect to the King, (this being an unofficial title, rather than an actual salaried post with the Office of Works). He worked for Augusta, Dowager Princess of Wales, making fanciful garden buildings at Kew, and in 1757 he published a book of Chinese designs which had a significant influence on contemporary taste. He developed his Chinese interests further with his Dissertation on Oriental Gardening (1772), a fanciful elaboration of contemporary English ideas about the naturalistic style of gardening in China.

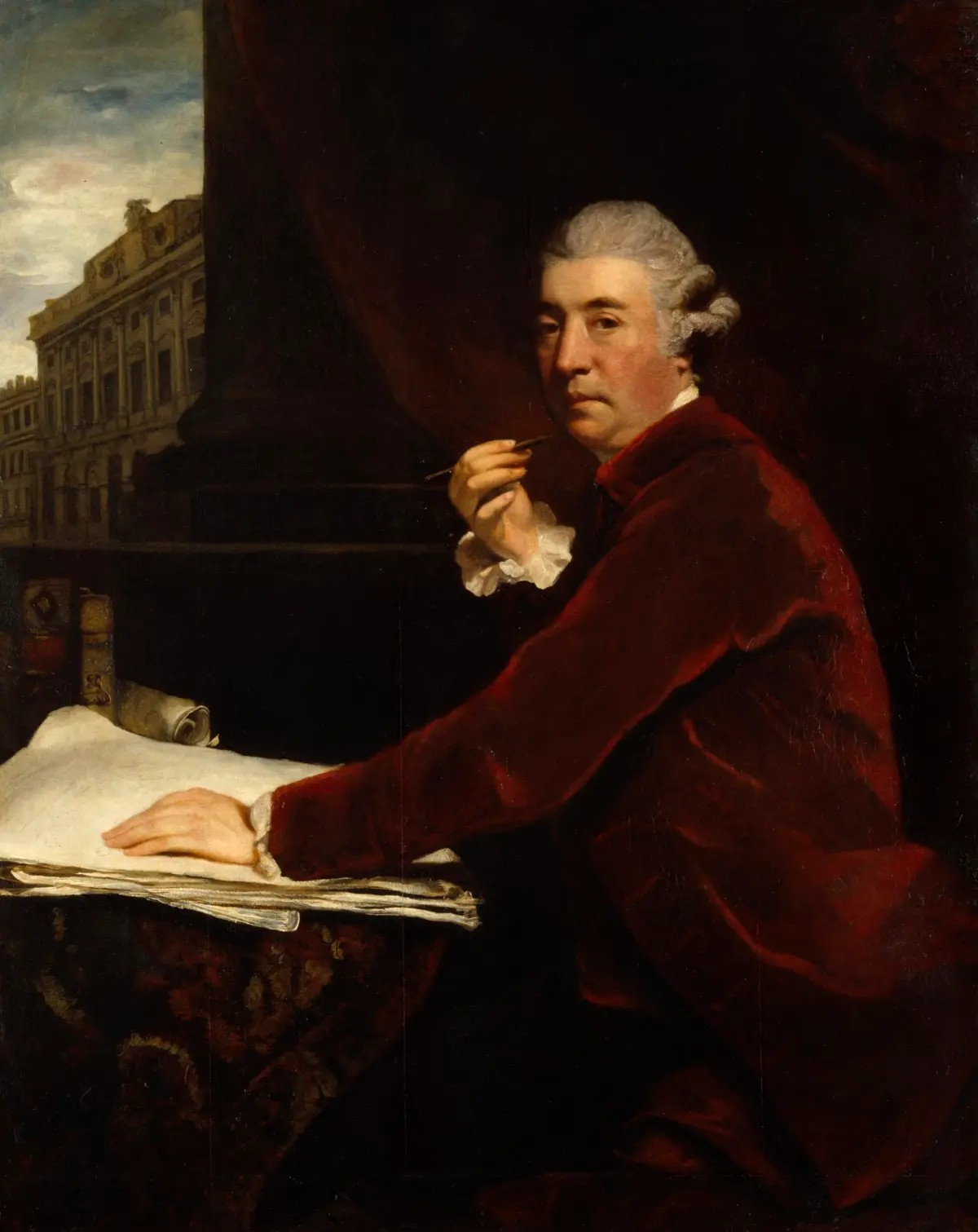
Portrait of Sir William Chambers by Joshua Reynolds, 1780

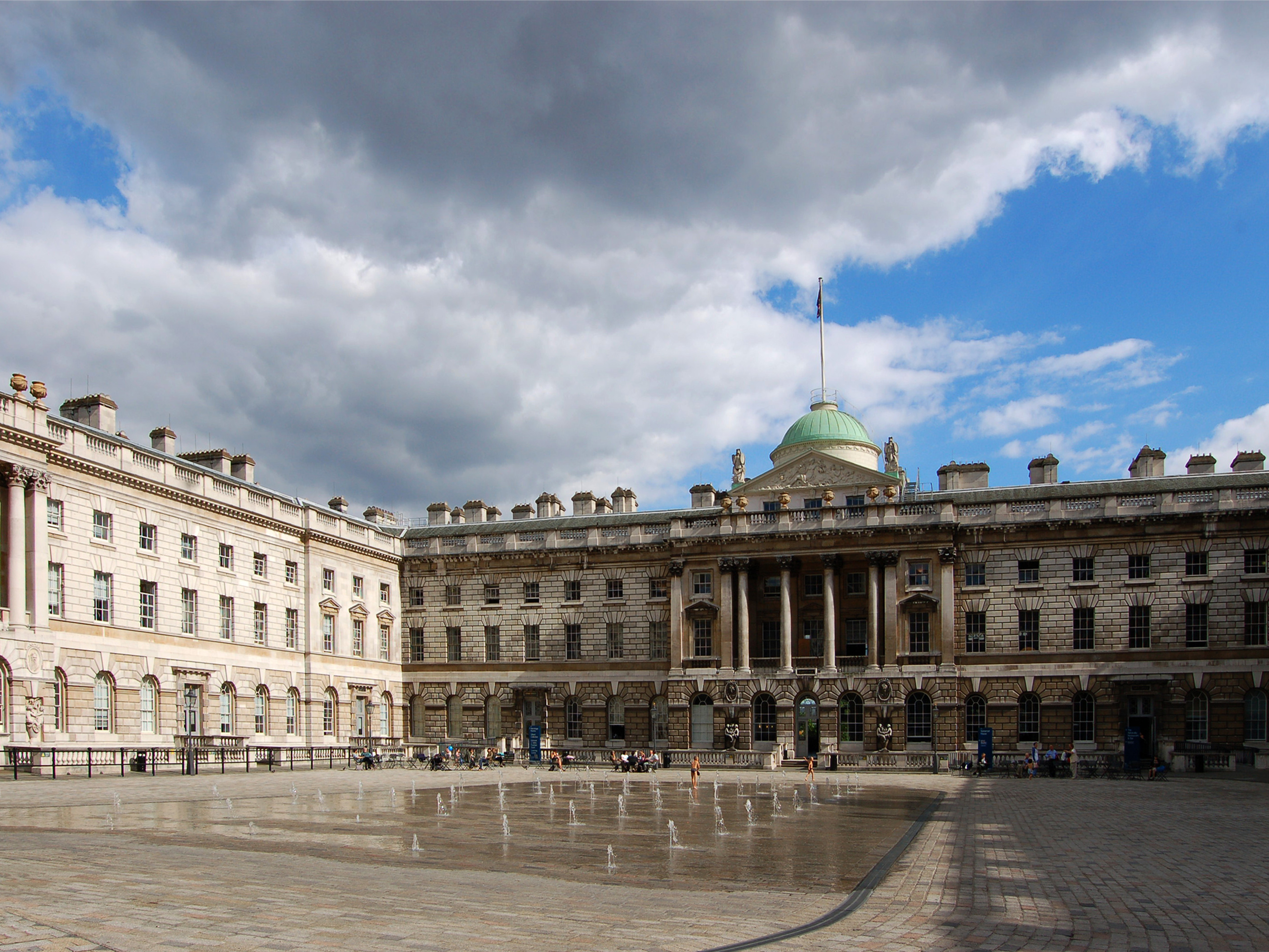
The central courtyard of Chambers' Somerset House in London. The pavement fountain was installed in the 1990s.

His more serious and academic Treatise on Civil Architecture published in 1759 proved influential on builders; it went into several editions and was still being republished in 1862. It dealt with the use of the classical orders, and gave suggestions for decorative elements, rather than dealing with construction and planning; for its third edition it was retitled A Treatise on the Decorative Parts of Civil Architecture. It included ideas from the works of many 16th- and 17th-century Italian architects then still little known in Britain. His influence was also transmitted through a host of younger architects trained as pupils in his office, including Thomas Hardwick (1752–1825), who helped him build Somerset House and who wrote his biography.

He was the major rival of Adam in British Neoclassicism. Chambers was more international in outlook (his knighthood being originally a Swedish honour) and was influenced by continental neoclassicism (which he in turn influenced) when designing for British clients. A second visit to Paris in 1774 confirmed the French cast to his sober and conservative refined blend of Neoclassicism and Palladian conventions. From around 1758 to the mid-1770s, Chambers concentrated on building houses for the nobility, beginning with one for Lord Bessborough at Roehampton. In 1766 Chambers was elected a foreign member of the Royal Swedish Academy of Sciences. From 1761 he held the unofficial post of Joint Architect to the King, he was then promoted to his first official post in the Office of Works and was from 1769–82 Comptroller of the King's Works, his final promotion put him in charge, from 1782 being Surveyor-General and Comptroller a post he kept until his death.

When a scheme to unite a number of government offices on the site of Somerset House in the Strand was projected, his position did not give him automatic authority over the construction; however when William Robinson, secretary to the board, who had been put in charge of the new building, died in 1775, Chambers became its architect. His initial plans for a great oval courtyard, connected to three smaller, narrow rectangular courts, were soon modified into a simpler rectilinear scheme.

On 10 December 1768 the Royal Academy was founded. Chambers played an important role in the events that led to the Academy's foundation, the Minutes of the General Assembly of the Royal Academy of 14 December 1768 record 'That some time towards the latter end of November 1768, Mr Chambers waited upon the King and informed him that many artists of reputation together with himself are very desirous of establishing a Society that should more effectively promote the Arts of Design'. He was appointed the Academy's first Treasurer.

Chambers died in London in 1796. He is buried in Poets' Corner in Westminster Abbey. His tombstone is inscribed:

Sir William Chambers, Knight of the Polar Star, Architect, Surveyor General of His Majesty's Works, F.R.S., F.A.S., R.S. Died March 8th, 1796. Aged 74.

=== Visits by Swedes ===
One of Chambers friends, James Maule, wrote in his journal in August 1771: I visited the Stock Exchange and met John Wilson. I also met several Swedes at sir William Chambers. I spent the Sunday with sir William Chambers at Hampton Court, where his family lives.

The orientalist Jakob Jonas Björnståhl wrote after a visit at Chambers house in London in 1775:

He counts himself a Swede and speaks the language just like a Swede. He really honours our Nation; he keeps a fairly beautiful house, where he receives Swedes and entertains them in a princely manner.

== Writings ==
- Designs of Chinese Buildings, Furniture, Dresses, Machines, and Utensils. To which is annexed, a Description of their Temples, Houses, Gardens, &c. (London) 1757
- Desseins des edifices, meubles, habits, machines, et ustenciles des Chinois; Auxquels est ajoutée une descr. de leurs temples, de leurs maisons, de leurs jardins, etc. (London) 1757
- A treatise on civil architecture in which the principles of that art are laid down and illustrated by a great number of plates accurately designed and elegantly engraved by the best hands (London) 1759
- Plans, Elevations, Sections and Perspective Views of the Gardens and Buildings at Kew in Surrey (London) 1763
- A dissertation on oriental gardening. (London) 1772

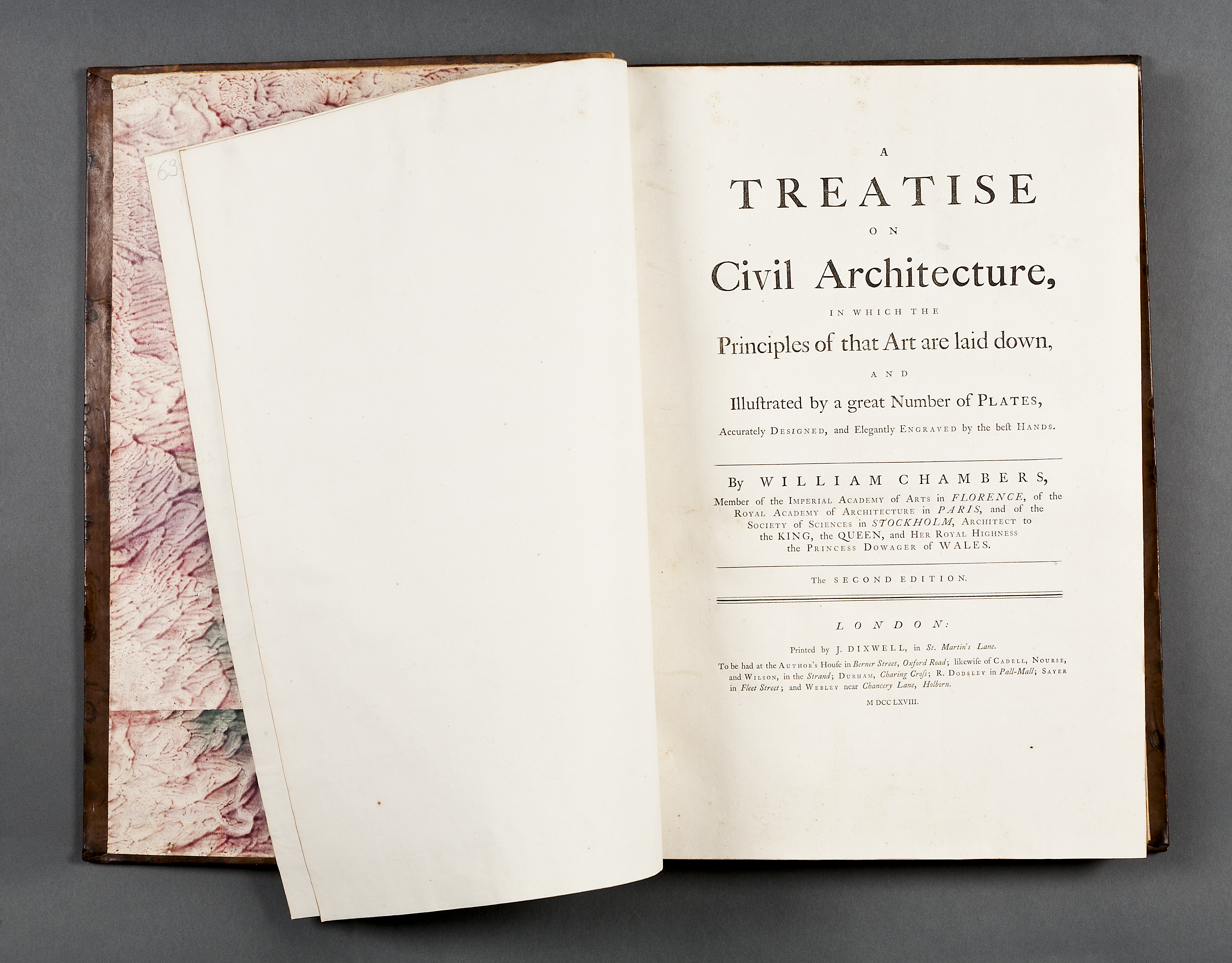
Treatise on Civil Architecture, second edition 1768

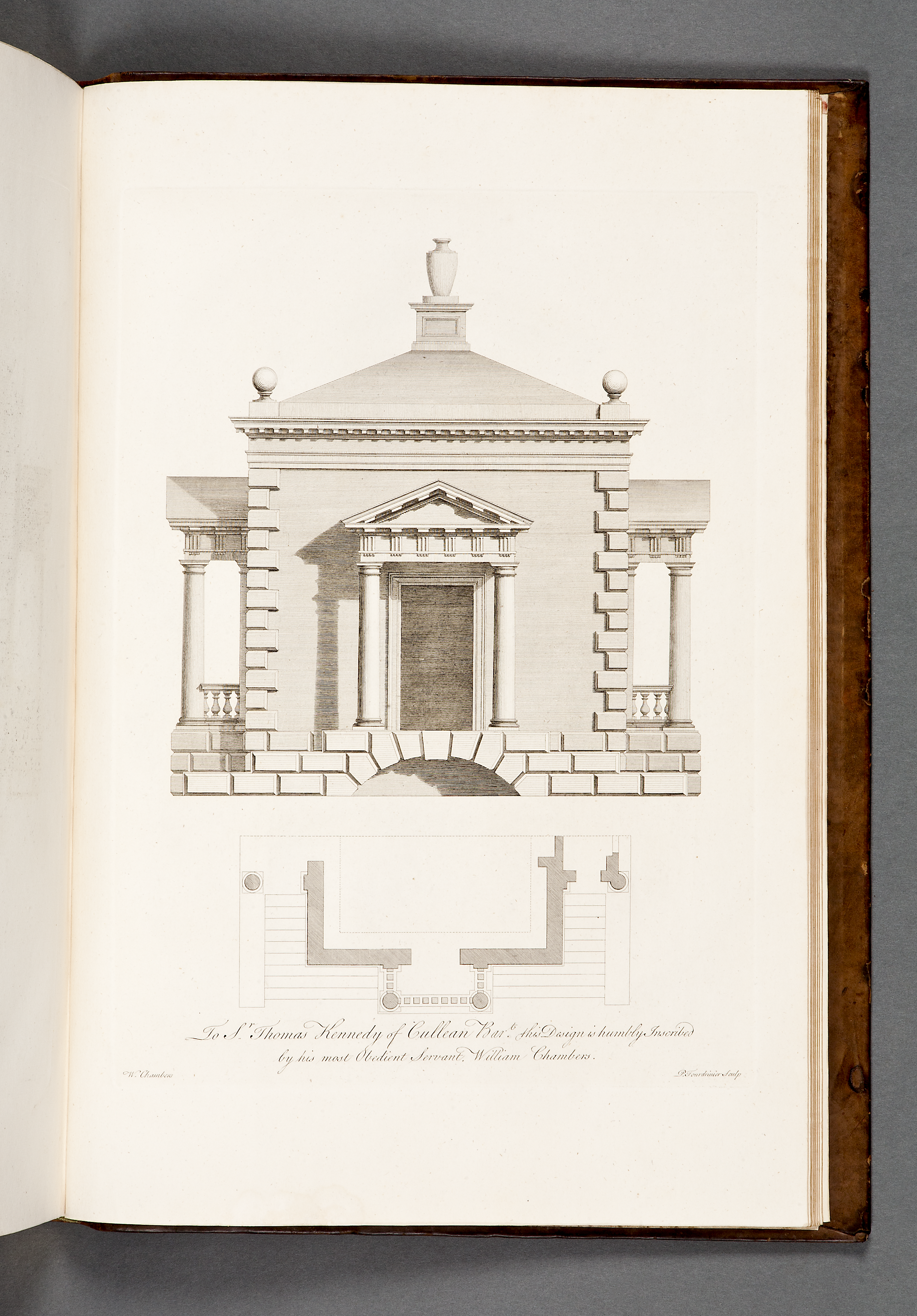
A treatise on civil architecture, second edition 1768

== Main works ==
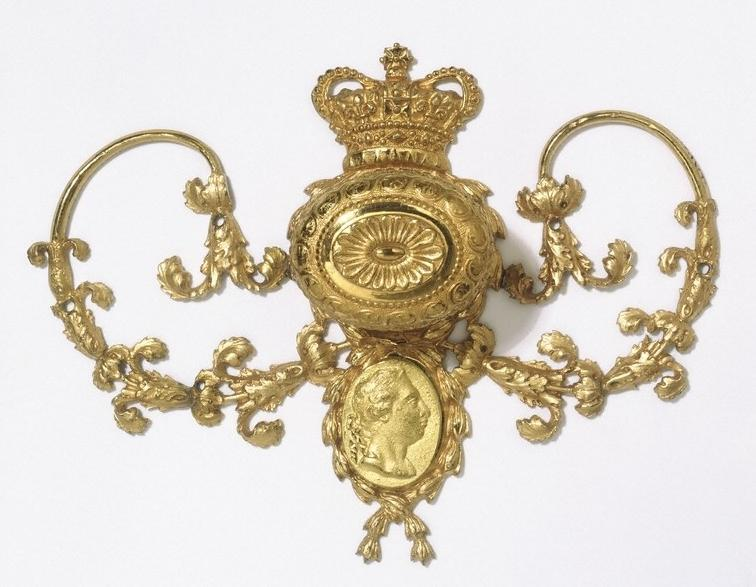
Door handle from Somerset House, about 1785, designed by Sir William Chambers V&A Museum no. 4013-1855

- Roehampton Villa (largely extant including interior ceilings), now called Parkstead House, for William Ponsonby, 2nd Earl of Bessborough. Also designed two garden temples (one to be re-erected by 2008), similar to those at the Royal Botanic Gardens, Kew.
- Within Kew Gardens, some of his buildings are lost, those remaining being the ten-storey Great Pagoda, the Orangery, the Ruined Arch, the Temple of Bellona and the Temple of Aeolus. The Temple of the Sun survived until 1916, when it was destroyed in a storm.
- The Pagoda, in Pagoda Gardens, Blackheath, London, is attributed to Chambers. A three-storey house built as a pavilion (c. 1775) for the Duke and Duchess of Buccleuch, it features a gabled Chinese-style roof with dramatic upturned corners. Caroline of Brunswick lived here after her separation from her husband, the Prince Regent, in 1799.
- Somerset House in London, his most famous building, which absorbed most of his energies over a period of two decades (1776–1796)
- The gilded state coach that is still used at coronations.
- Hedsor House, Buckinghamshire, the seat of Lord Boston, equerry to George III.
- For James Caulfeild, 1st Earl of Charlemont, he designed Charlemont House and the Casino at Marino, as well as the chapel and public theatre in Trinity College, Dublin.
- He is also associated with Gothic additions to Milton Abbey in Dorset and the planning of the nearby rural village of Milton Abbas, sometimes considered the first planned settlement in England. This work was carried out in collaboration with landscape gardener Capability Brown in 1780 for Joseph Damer, 1st Earl of Dorchester, who wanted to relocate the existing village further away from his home at the Abbey.
- Wick House, Richmond Hill, commissioned in 1771 by painter Sir Joshua Reynolds.
- Osterley Park, remodelling work in the 1760s.

== List of architectural work ==
=== London work ===
- Kew Gardens, Kew, Surrey, various structures: House of Confucius (1749) demolished; Frederick, Prince of Wales, Mausoleum (unexecuted); Gallery of Antiquities (1757) demolished; Orangery (1757–61); Temple of Pan (1758) demolished; Temple of Arethusa (1758) demolished; Alhambra (1758) demolished; Garden Seat (1758) demolished; Porter's Lodge (1758) demolished; Stables (1758) demolished; Temple of Victory (1759) demolished; Ruined Arch (1759); Theatre of Augusta (1760) demolished; Temple of Bellona (1760); Menagerie (1760) demolished; Exotic Garden (1760) demolished; Mosque (1761) demolished; Temple of the Sun (1761) demolished 1916 after damage in a storm; Great Pagoda (1761–62); Temple of Peace (1763) demolished; Temple of Aeolus (1763); Temple of Solitude (1763) demolished; Palladian Bridge (1763) demolished; Dairy (1773) demolished; and alterations to Kew Palace – demolished
- Leicester House, Leicester Square, alterations (1757) – demolished
- Carlton House, alterations, (1757–61), new porters lodge and remodelled entrance passage (c. 1761), later virtually rebuilt (1783–6) by Henry Holland – demolished
- Richmond House, Whitehall, gallery, greenhouse, gate to Privy Garden (1759–60) – demolished
- Parkstead House (formerly Manresa House and Bessborough House), Roehampton (1760)
- 47 Leicester Square, Sir Joshua Reynolds's house, new painting room and gallery (c. 1760-2) – demolished
- Pembroke House, Whitehall, internal decoration (1760) riding house (1773) – demolished
- Buckingham Palace (then Queen's House), addition of north & south wings, west and east libraries, the Octagon Library, interior decorations and riding house (1762–68) – none of this work survives
- Grantham House, Whitehall, alterations (1760s) – demolished
- 25 Grosvenor Square, internal alterations (1762) – demolished
- Richmond Palace, Richmond, various designs (1762, 1764, 1769, 1775) – none executed
- 45 Berkeley Square, internal decoration (1763–7)
- 13–22, 44–58 Berners Street (1764–70)
- Gower House, Whitehall, Chamber's largest town house (1765–74) – demolished
- German Lutheran Chapel, Savoy Palace, (1766) – demolished
- 20 Grosvenor Square, internal alterations (1767) – demolished
- Kew Observatory, Old Deer Park, for George III (1768)
- 6 Cheyne Walk, Chelsea (c. 1768)
- St James's Palace, internal decorations (late 1760s)
- 21 Arlington Street, Westminster (1769)
- Milton House, Park Lane, entrance gate and screen (1769–71) – demolished
- Bedford House, Bloomsbury, London, alterations and internal decorations (c. 1769 – c. 1772) – demolished
- 79 Piccadilly, alterations including addition of attic storey (1770–71) – demolished
- Errington House (later Warwick House), Cleveland Row (1770–71) – demolished
- House Knightsbridge (1770–72) – demolished
- Wick House, Richmond Hill (1771–72)
- 3 St. James's Square, internal alterations (1771) – demolished
- The Earl and Countess of Mountrath's tomb, St John's Chapel, Westminster Abbey (1771)
- Melbourne House Piccadilly, (1771–76) converted to the Albany by Henry Holland (1803–4)
- Marlborough House, addition of attic and internal alterations including new chimney-piece in the state drawing room (1771–74)
- 14 Cecil Street, interior work (c. 1772)
- 62 Curzon Street (1773)
- 15 George Street, internal alterations and Doric porch (1774)
- 51 Grosvenor Street, alterations (1774–5)
- Somerset House, Chambers' magnum opus (1776–96), the building was unfinished at Chambers' death and continued in (1829–31) under Robert Smirke who added the east wing

=== England outside London ===
- Goodwood House, Sussex, South wing of house & stables (1757–60)
- Wilton House, Wiltshire, Triumphal arch, Casina, Rock Bridge, Library, tennis court (1757–74)
- Duntish Court, Dorset, new house (c. 1760–64)
- Poston Court, Herefordshire, casino (1760)
- Newby Park, (now Baldersby Park), Yorkshire, alterations to the house, pheasantry and menagerie (c. 1760)
- Peper Harow House, Surrey (1760–65)
- Osterley Park, Middlesex, north front and gallery (1761); the rest of the house by Robert Adam
- Beechwood, Hertfordshire, dining room (1761)
- The Hyde, near Ingatestone, Essex, hall and staircase (1761)
- The Hoo, Hertfordshire, alterations and interior decoration, bridge, temple, gateway, stables, boathouse and gate piers (c. 1762)
- Temple of Romulus and Remus, Coleby Hall, Coleby, North Kesteven, Lincolnshire (1762)
- Styche Hall, Shropshire, new house and stables (1762–66)
- Walcot Hall, Shropshire, remodelling (1764–7)
- Teddington Grove, Middlesex, new house, greenhouse and temple (c. 1765)
- Whitton Place, Middlesex, Mausoleum, redecoration of house, Roman Bathhouse, greenhouse, Temple of Aesculapius (1765–90)
- Completion of John Vardy's house for Andrew Drummond (Vardy had died), Stanmore, Middlesex (1765–70)
- Houghton House, Houghton Conquest, Bedfordshire, restoration and alterations (1765); now a ruin
- Kirkleatham Hall, Kirkleatham, Yorkshire, now the local museum and gallery (c. 1765)
- Woodstock Town Hall, Woodstock, Oxfordshire (1766)
- Blenheim Palace, Oxfordshire, Internal decorations, furniture, gateway to kitchen garden, Blagdon Bridge, Temple of Diana, Temple of Flora, Flower Garden, erection of Bernini Obelisk (1766–1775)
- Monument to Wriothesley Russell, 2nd Duke of Bedford, St Michael's, Chenies, Buckinghamshire (1766)
- Wrest Park, Bedfordshire, Chinese Pavilion attributed (c. 1766)
- Ansley Hall, Ansley, Warwickshire Chinese temple (1767)
- Barton Hall, Norfolk, Library (1767)
- Terling Place, Essex, work of unknown nature (1767–8)
- Woburn Abbey, Bedfordshire, south wing including eating room and library; and Basin Bridge (1767–72)
- Cobham Hall, Kent, new rooms in south wing including the library, raising of attic (c. 1767–70)
- Southill House, Southill, Bedfordshire, alterations (c. 1768); the house was later rebuilt by Henry Holland
- Ampthill Park, Ampthill, Bedfordshire, addition of wings and redecoration of the interiors (1768–72)
- Milton Abbey, Dorset, new house, porter's lodge and west front of abbey church, uniquely for Chambers all in Gothic revival style
- New House, Woodstock, Oxfordshire (c. 1769)
- Danson House, Kent, internal alterations including new chimney-pieces, the Temple and 'Palladio Bridge' (late 1760s–1770)
- Tottenham House, Wiltshire, work of unknown nature (1770–76)
- Milton Hall, Cambridgeshire, alterations and interior decoration and garden temples (1770–76)
- Trinity House Chapel, Kingston upon Hull, Yorkshire (1772)
- Amesbury Hall, Amesbury, Wiltshire, Chinese temple (1772) and ornamental bridge (1775)
- Theatre Royal, Liverpool (1772); demolished
- Milton Abbas, estate village for Milton Abbey (1773)
- Newburgh Priory, Coxwold, Yorkshire, alterations (1774)
- Hedsor House, Buckinghamshire (1778)

=== Ireland ===
- Abbeyleix House, managing the construction of the house which had earlier been designed by James Wyatt
- Casino at Marino, Marino, Dublin (1758–76). Garden pavilion for 1st Earl of Charlemont. Open to the public.
- Marino House, Dublin. (1758–75) Alterations and additions to existing country house for 1st Earl of Charlemont. Demolished.
- Marino House, Dublin. Dragon gates. Relocated from original position.
- Castletown House, (1760) County Kildare, internal alterations of long gallery and other rooms and gate piers for Thomas Connolly
- Slane Castle, County Meath, work of unknown nature (1760s)
- Charlemont House, Rutland Square, Dublin (1762–75) for 1st Earl of Charlemont. City house. Adapted for use as Hugh Lane Gallery. Porch added by others. Rear section demolished.
- Headford, County Meath, (1765) Unexecuted design for country house with 13 bay garden front
- Town Hall, Main Street, Strabane, County Tyrone. Design for steeple.
- Leinster House, Dublin, redecoration of first floor apartments on garden front (1767)
- Hunting lodge, Roxborough Castle, Moy, County Tyrone. (1768). Two unexecuted designs for Lord Charlemont.
- City Hall, Parliament Street, Dublin, (1768–1769). Unsuccessful competition entry.
- Rathfarnham Castle, County Dublin, refaced 16th-century castle, provided with Georgian windows, straight roof parapets with urns and Georgian interiors (1770–71) for Henry, 4th. Viscount Loftus, Later 1st. Earl of Ely.
- Lucan House, Lucan, County Dublin, (1773–75) for Agmondisham Vesey. Now Italian Embassy.
- Trinity College, Dublin, East range. (1775). Not built.
- Trinity College, Dublin, College Exam Hall. (1775) In use as exam hall and theatre.
- Trinity College, Dublin, Collegiate chapel (c. 1775–1797). In use as chapel.

=== Scotland ===
- Dunmore Pineapple, Falkirk, attributed (1761)
- Duddingston House, Duddingston, house, stables and temple (1763–68)
- 26 St Andrew Square, Edinburgh (1769)
- Dundas House, (now The Royal Bank of Scotland), St Andrew Square, Edinburgh (1771–74)

=== Sweden ===
- Råda säteri, manor house in Härryda just outside of Gothenburg, (1770–72)
- Partille herrgård, manor house in Partille just outside of Gothenburg, (1772–73)
- Svartsjö Palace, concept for remodeling of the royal gardens, (1773–74).

== Gallery of architectural works ==
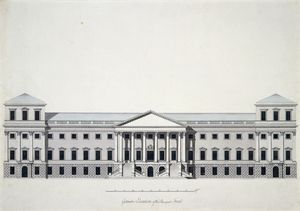
Richmond Palace, not executed

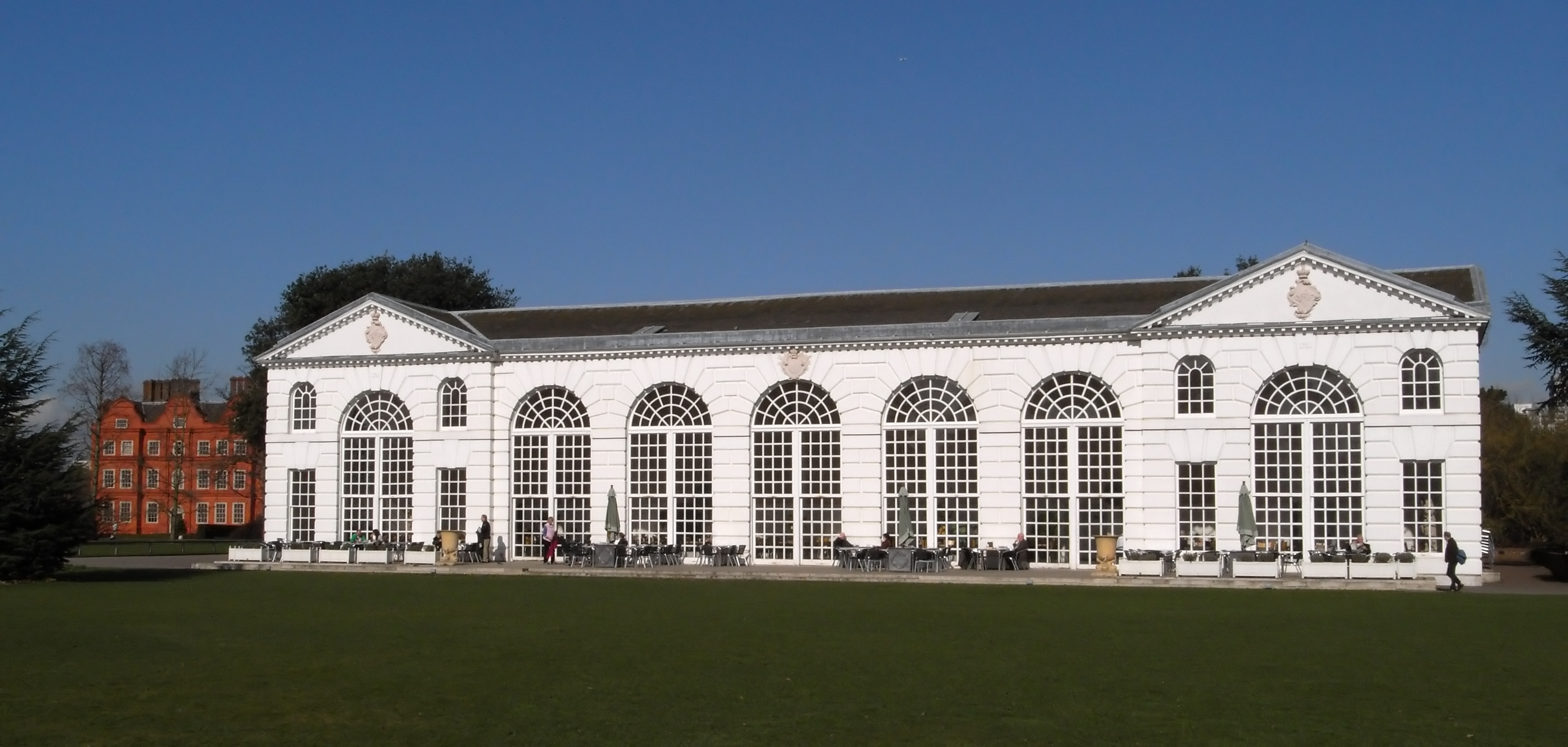
The Orangery, Kew Gardens

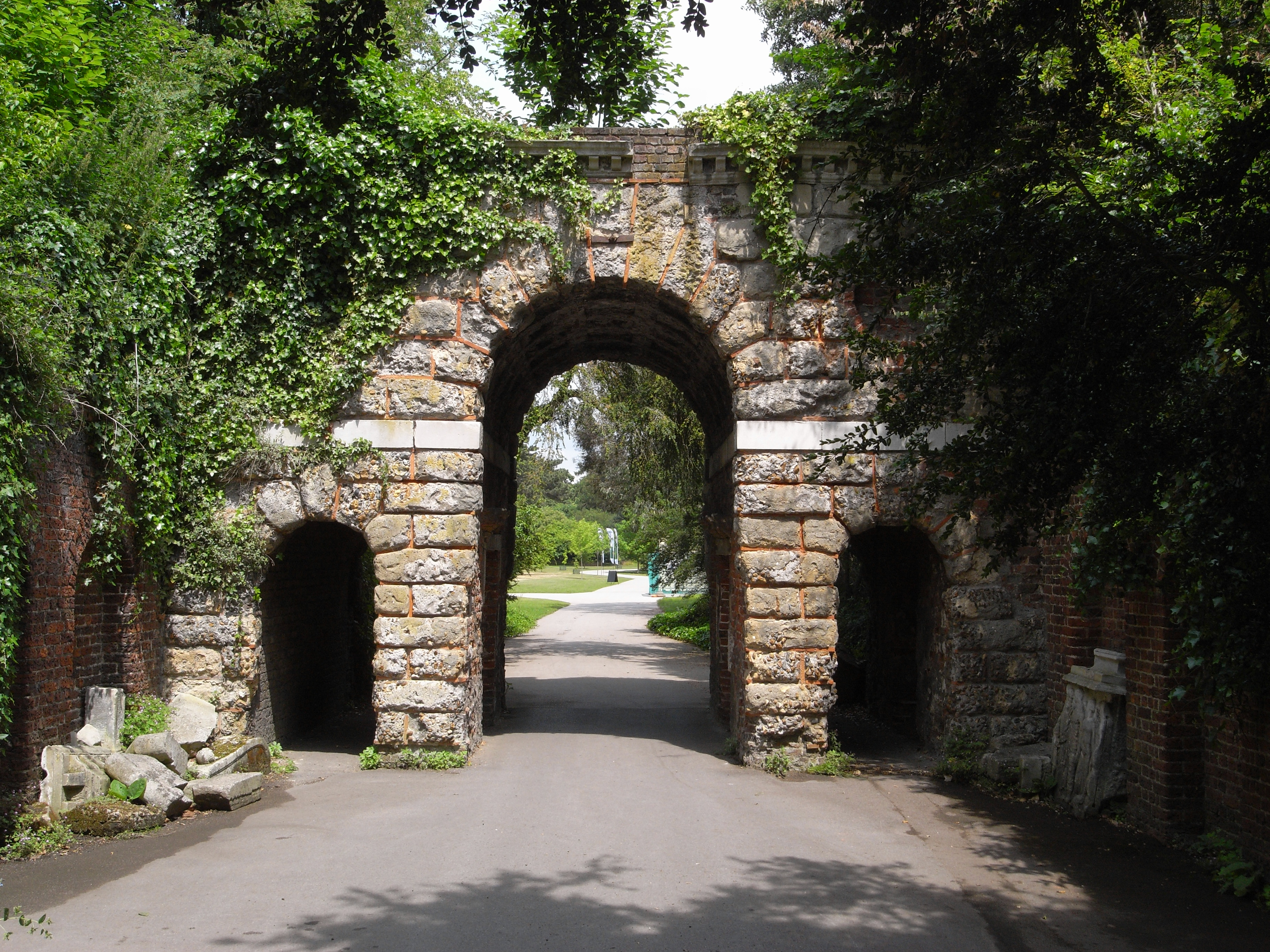
The Ruined Arch, Kew Gardens

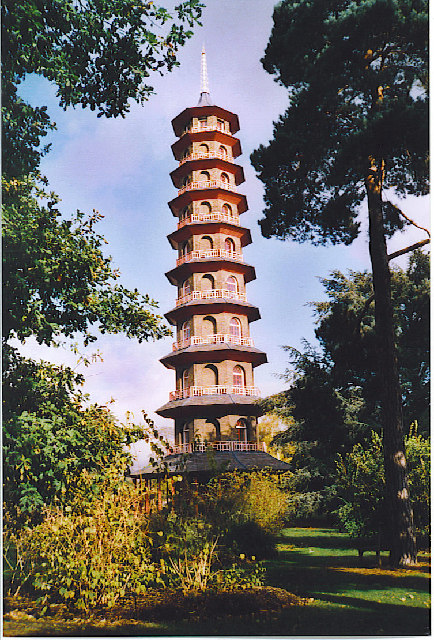
The Pagoda, Kew Gardens

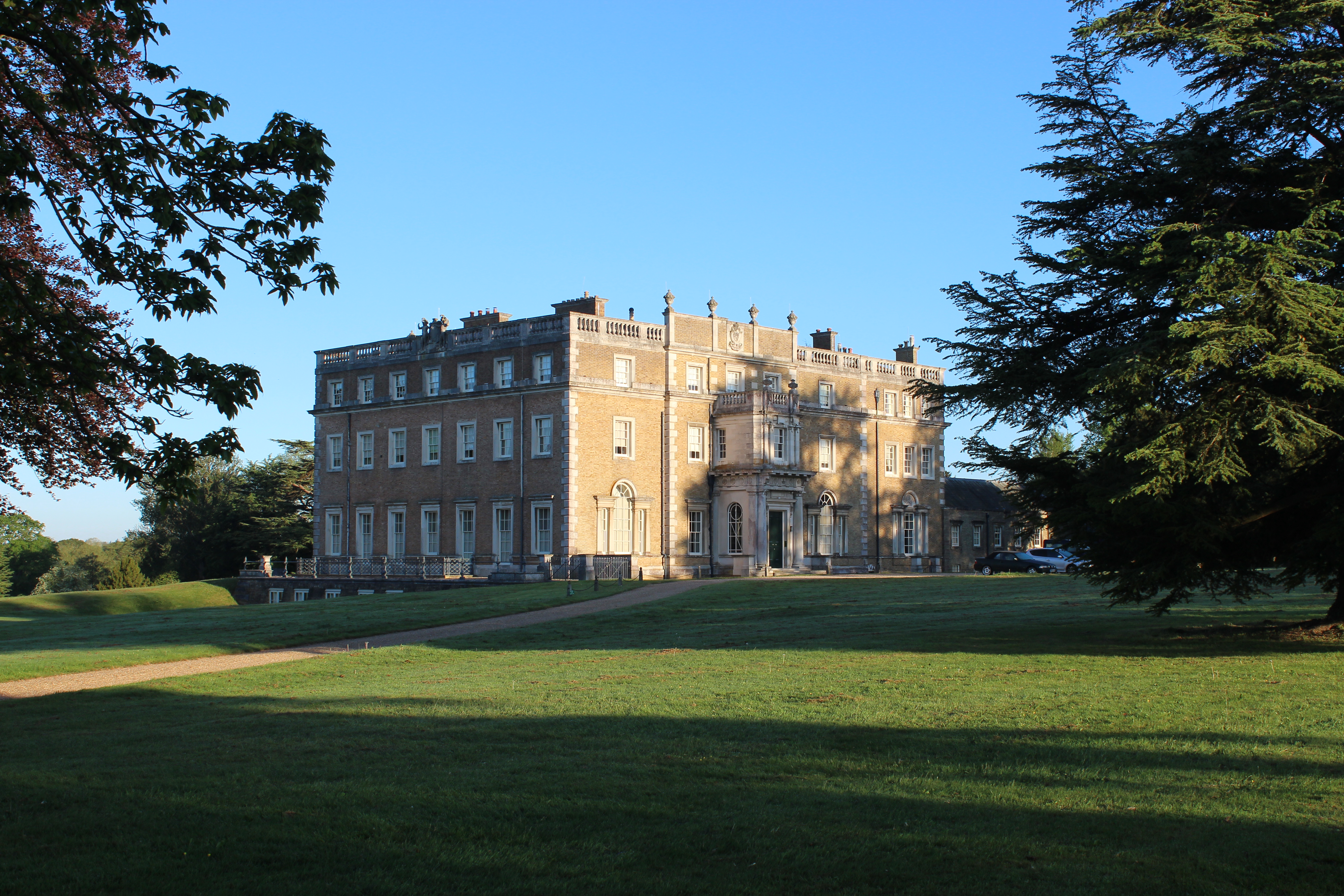
Peper Harrow House, Surrey

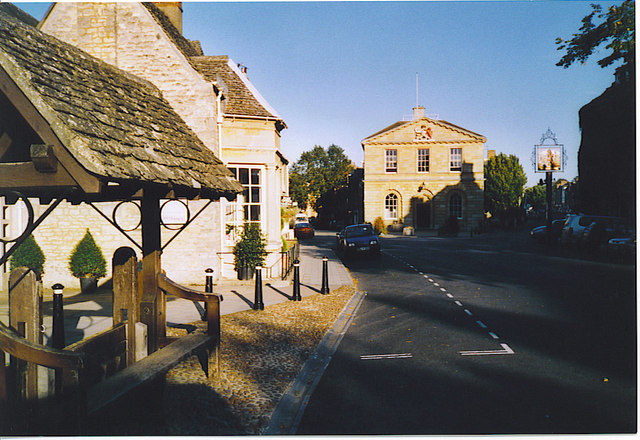
Woodstock Town Hall

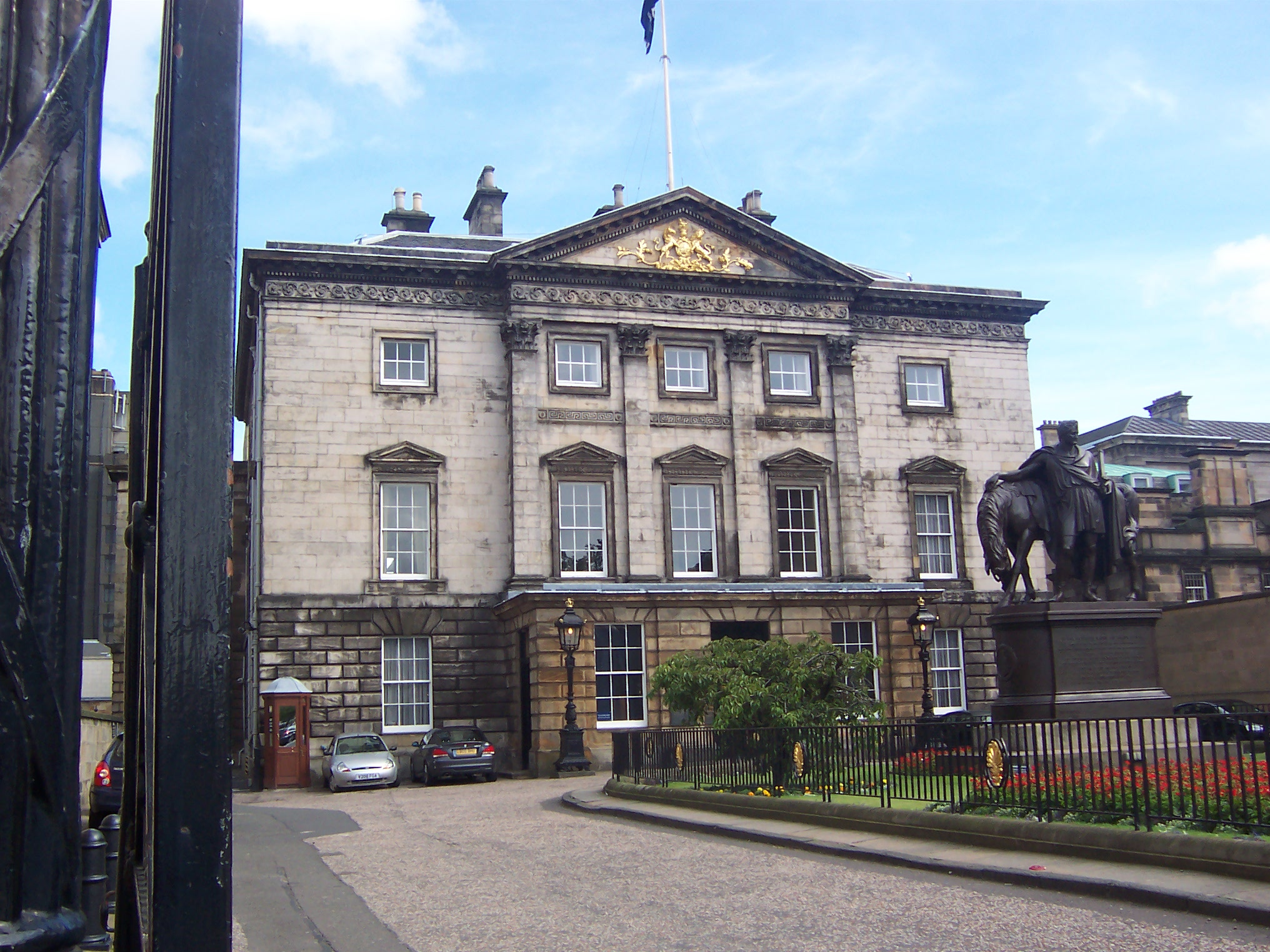
Former Dundas House, Edinburgh

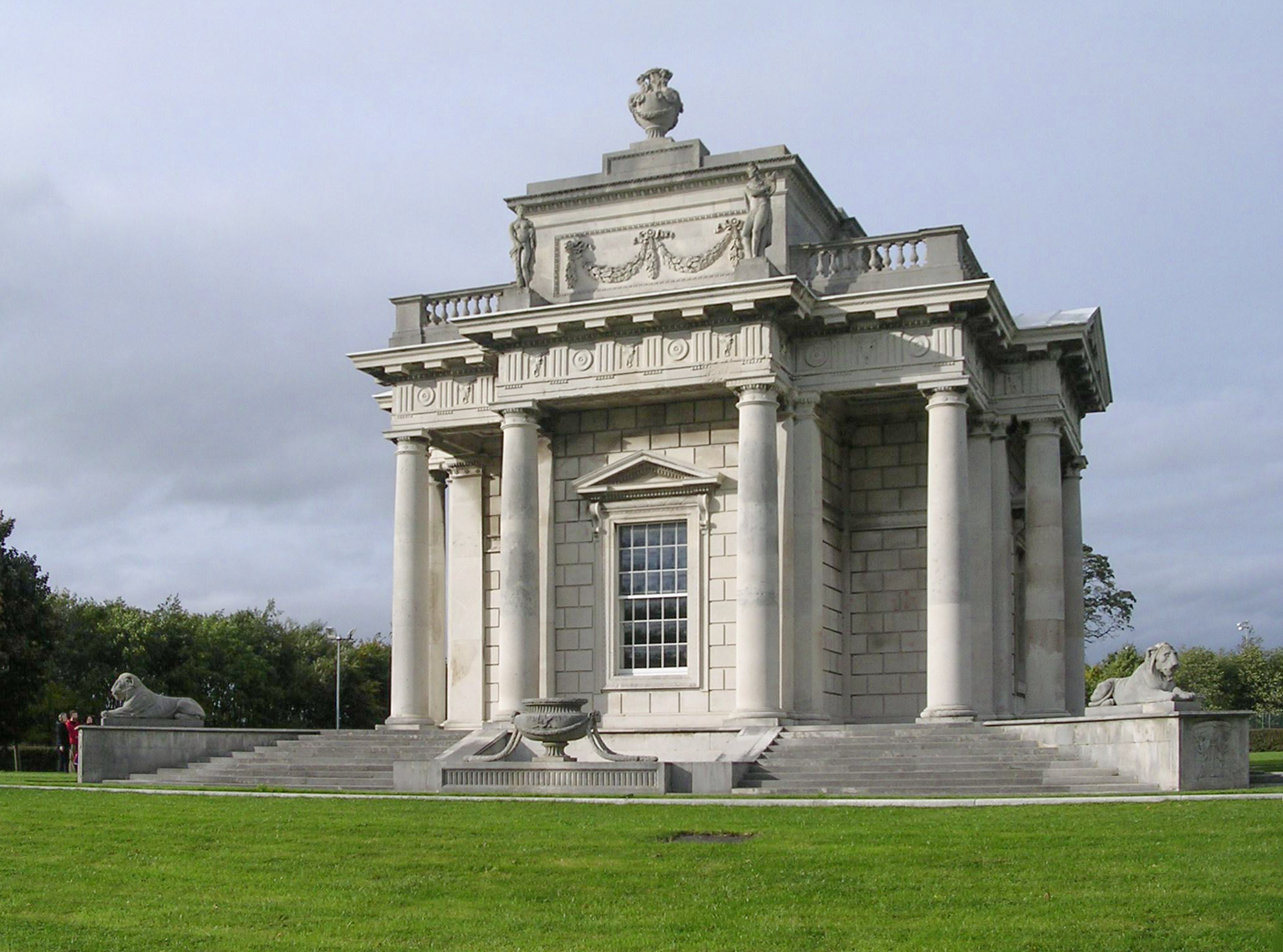
Casino at Marino, Dublin

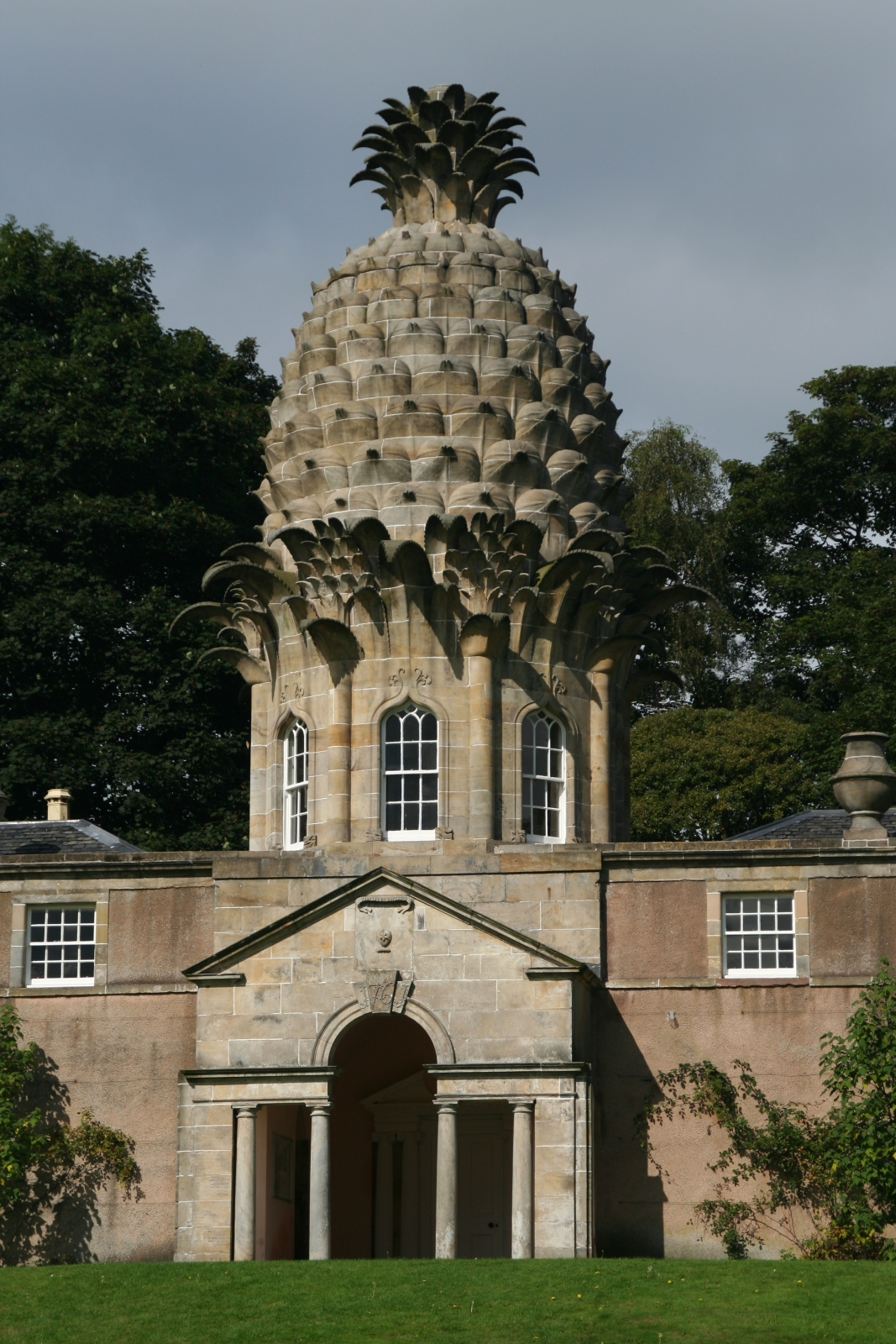
Dunmore Pineapple, Falkirk, Scotland

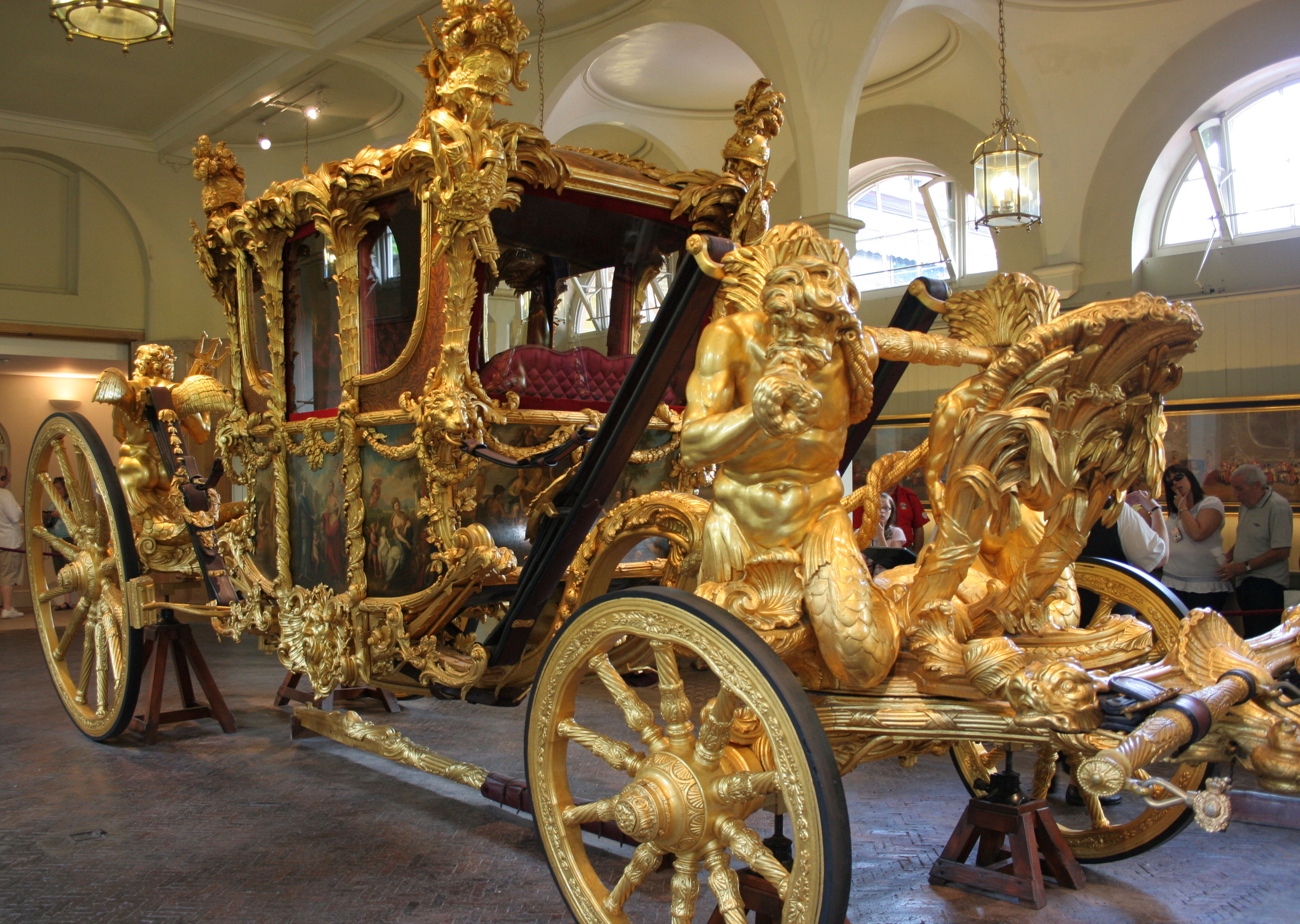
The State Coach, Royal Mews, London

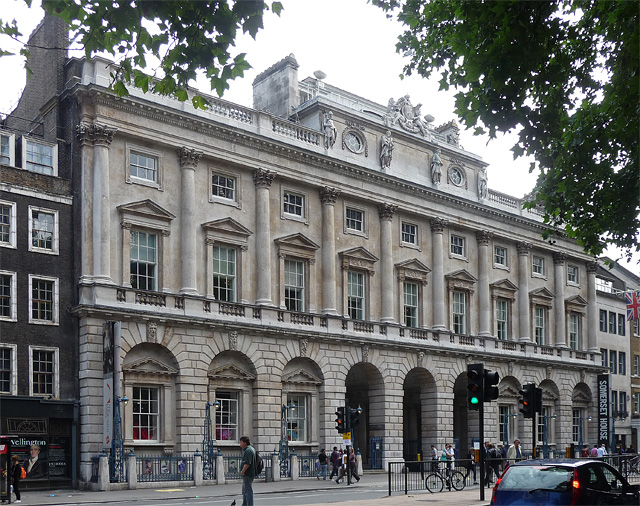
Strand front, Somerset House, London

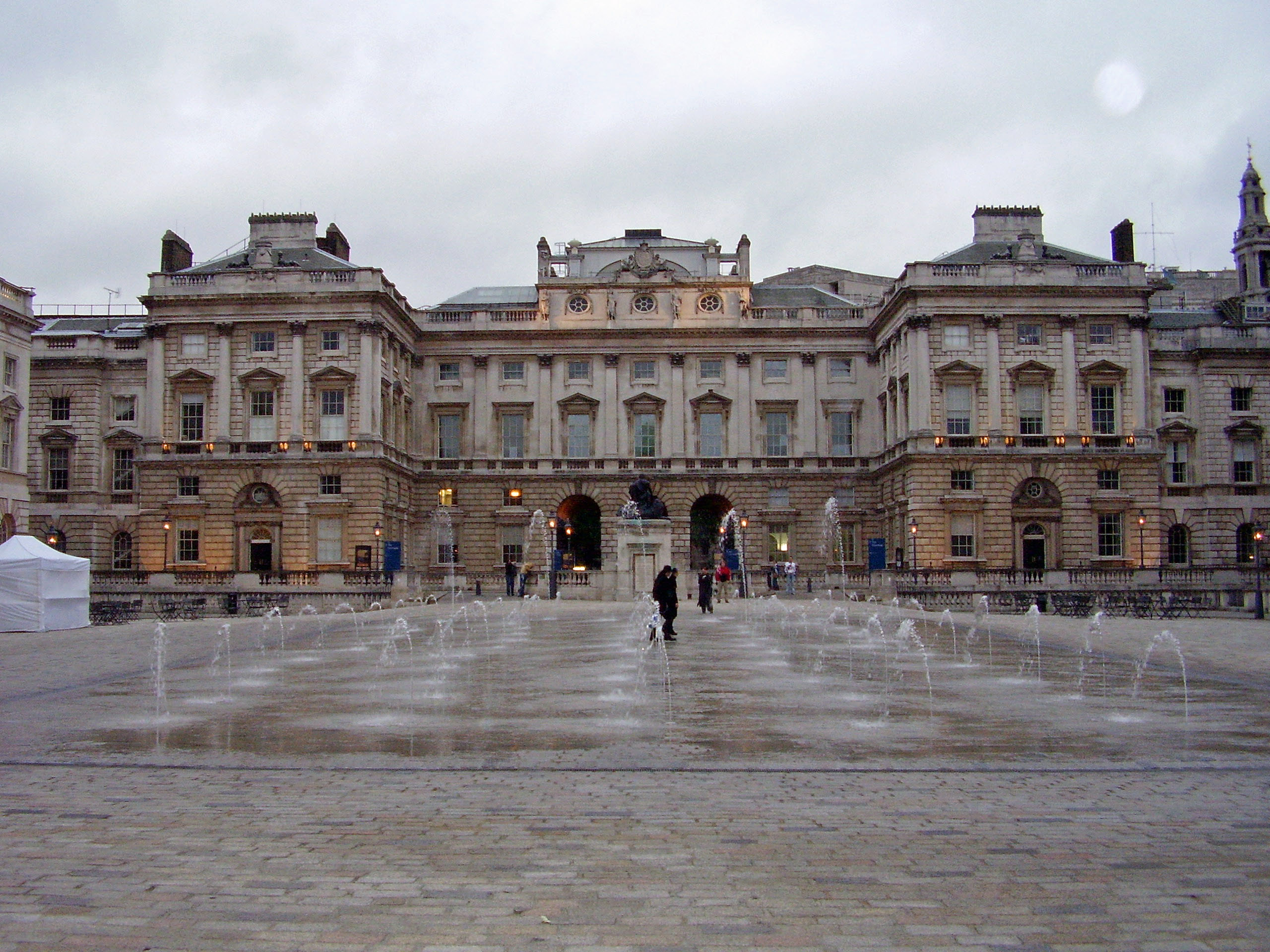
Strand block from courtyard, Somerset House, London

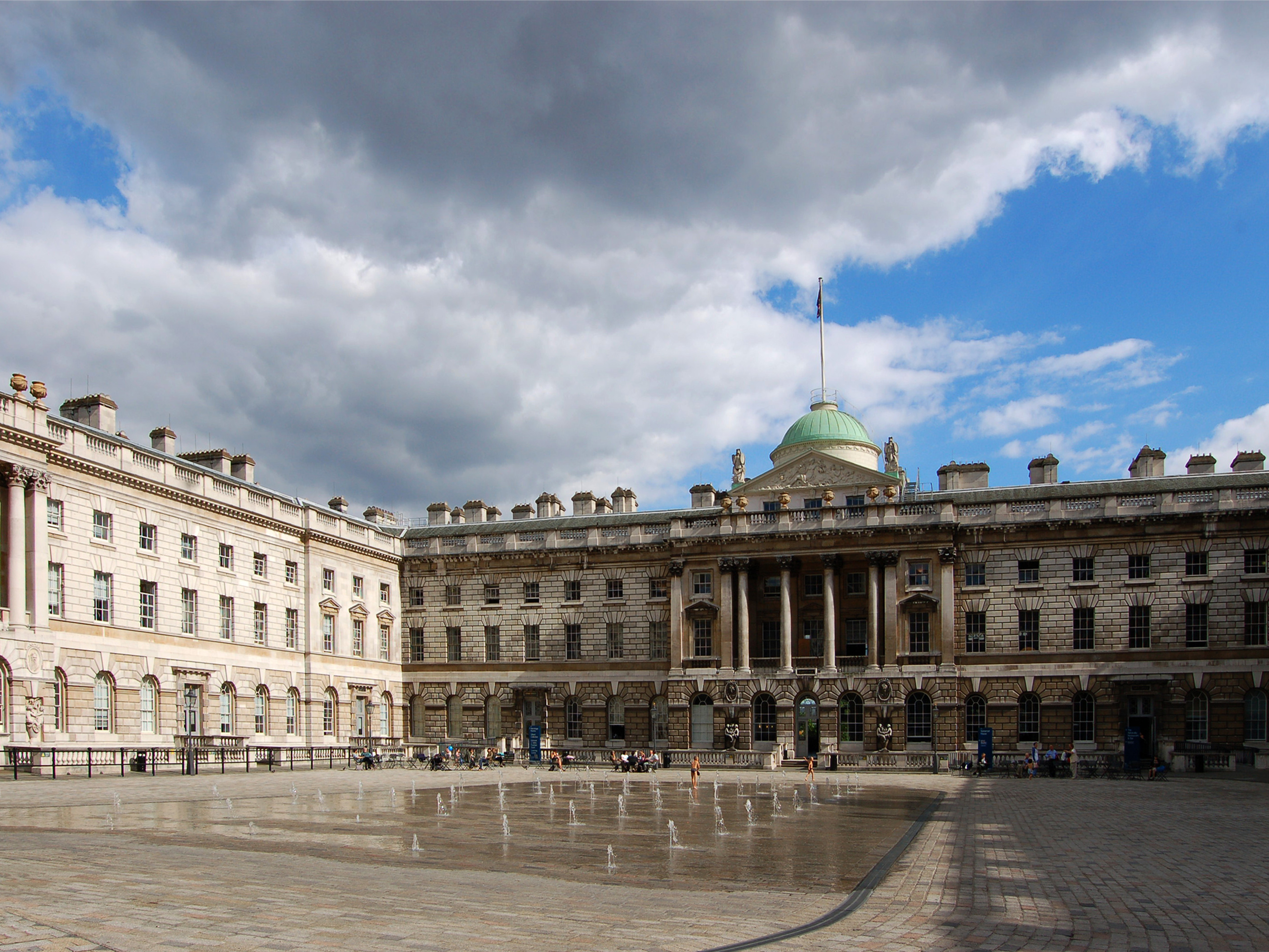
Courtyard, Somerset House, London

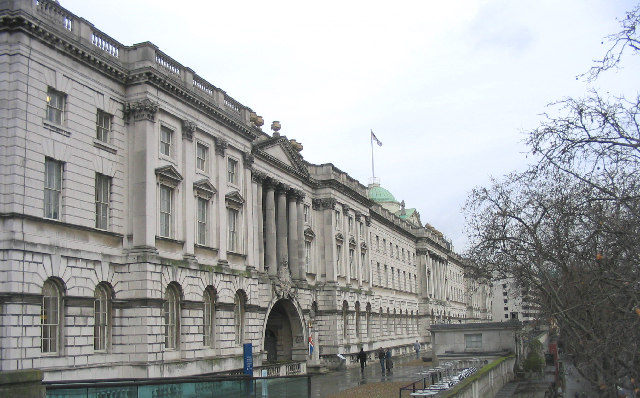
Thames front, Somerset House, London

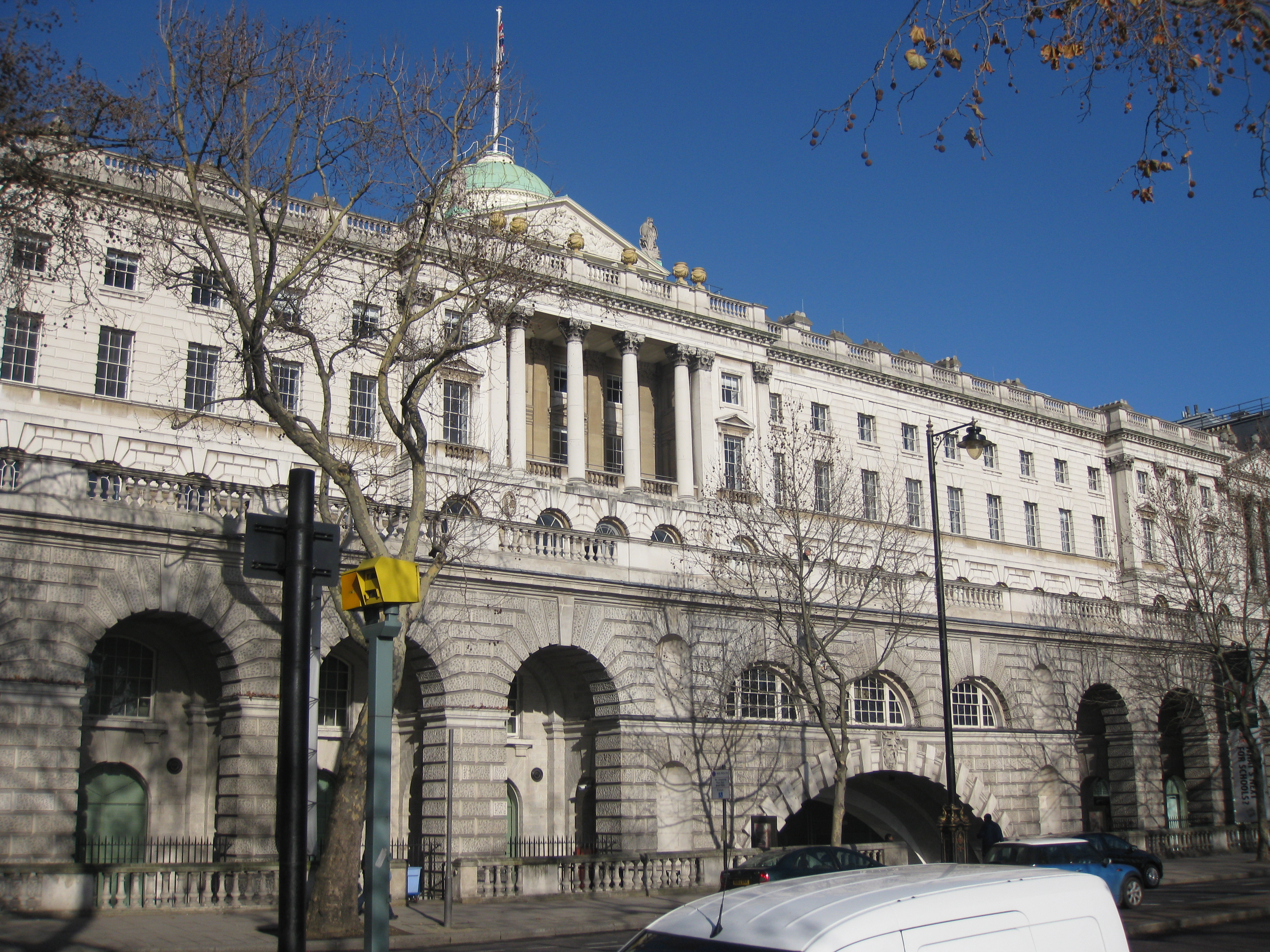
Centre of Thames front, Somerset House, London

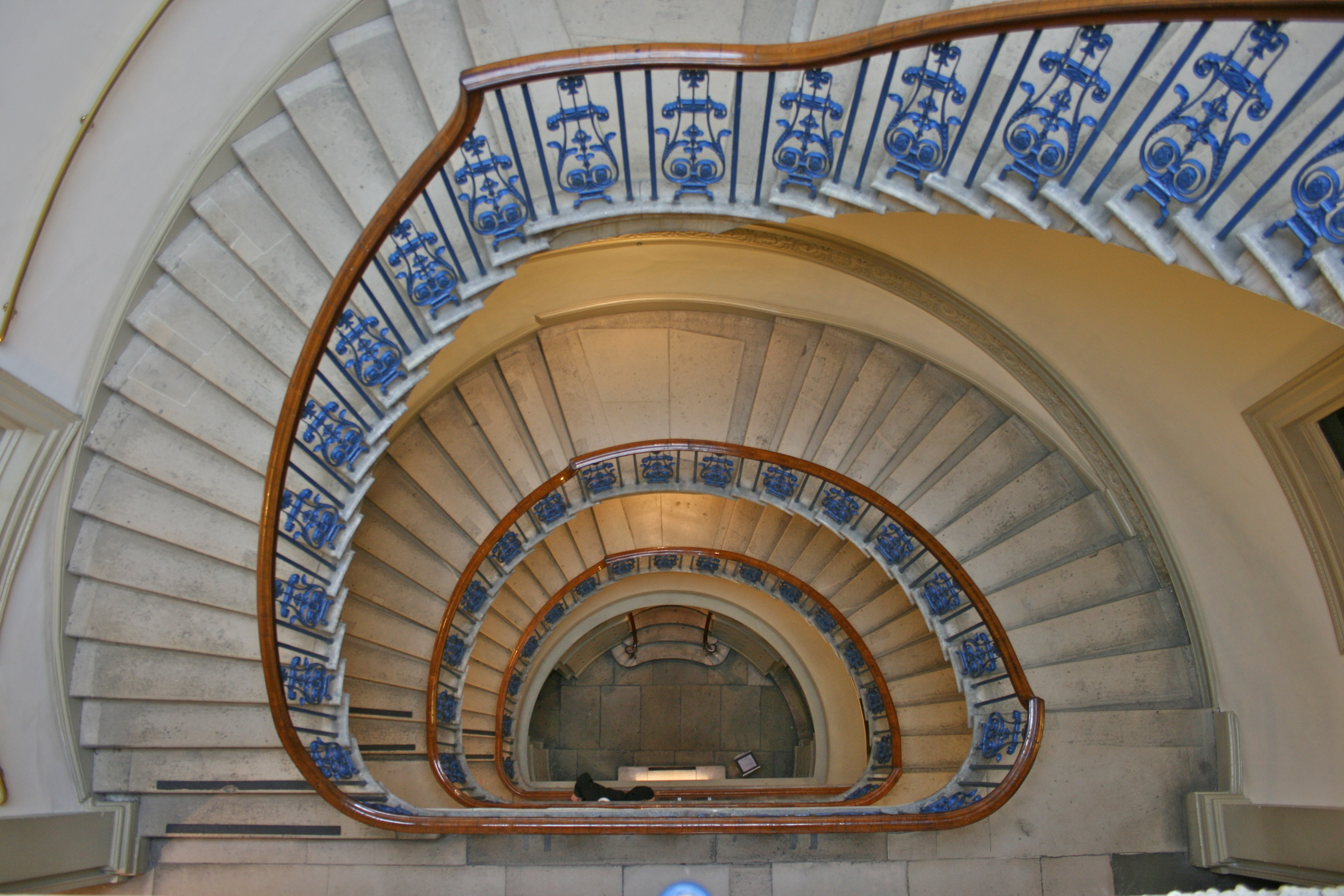
Staircase in Strand Block, Somerset House, London

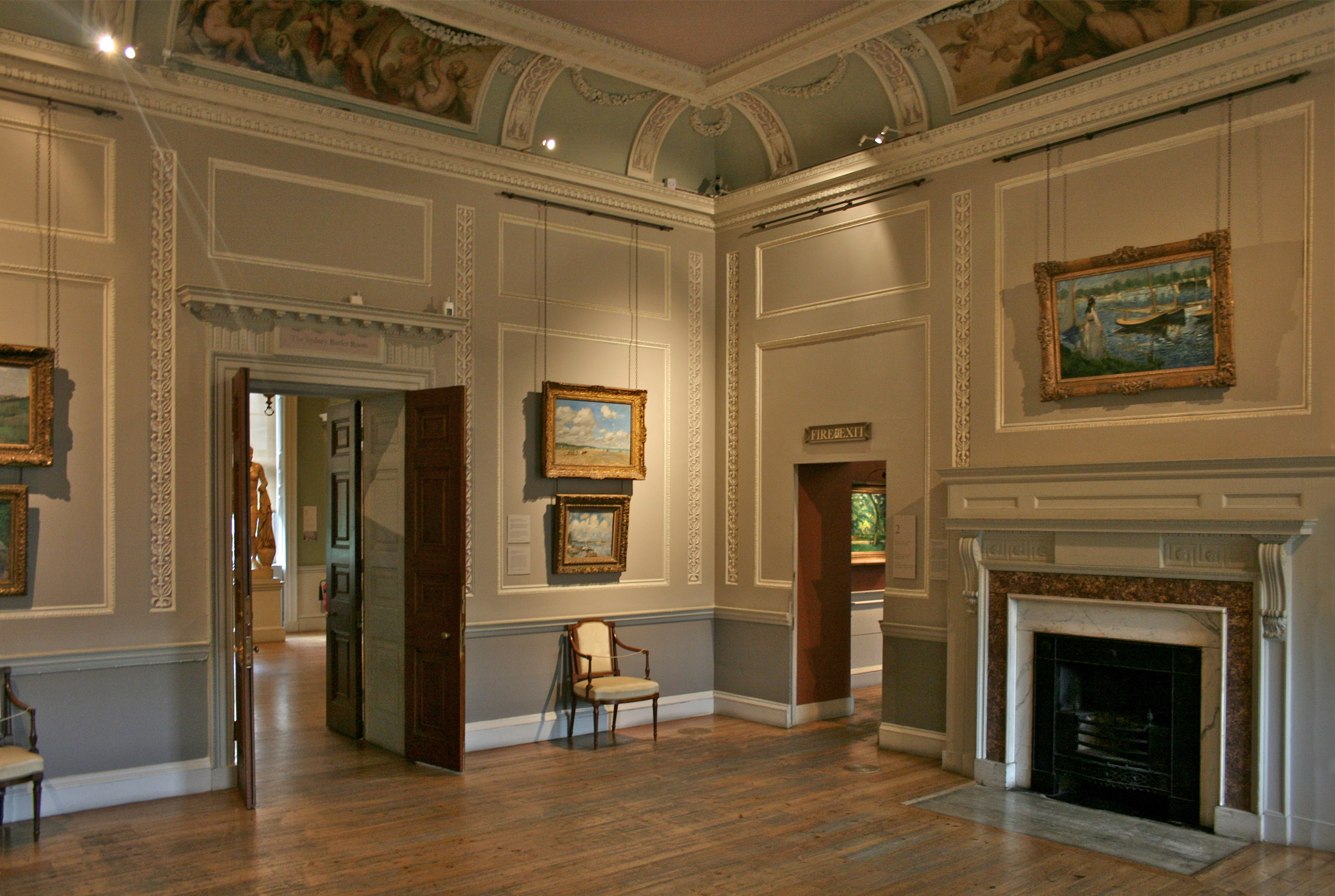
Room in Strand Block, Somerset House, London

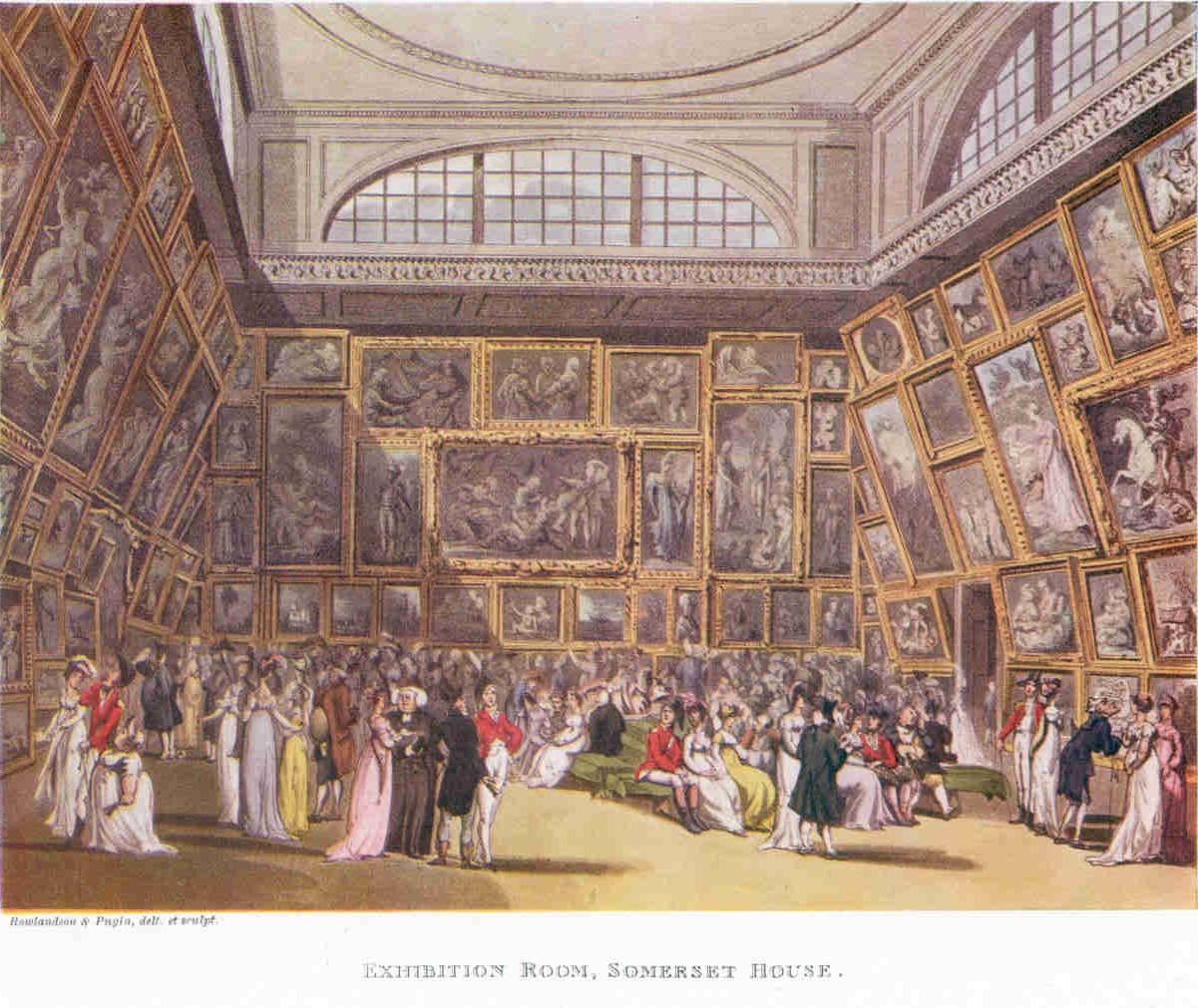
The Exhibition Room, former Royal Academy, Somerset House, London

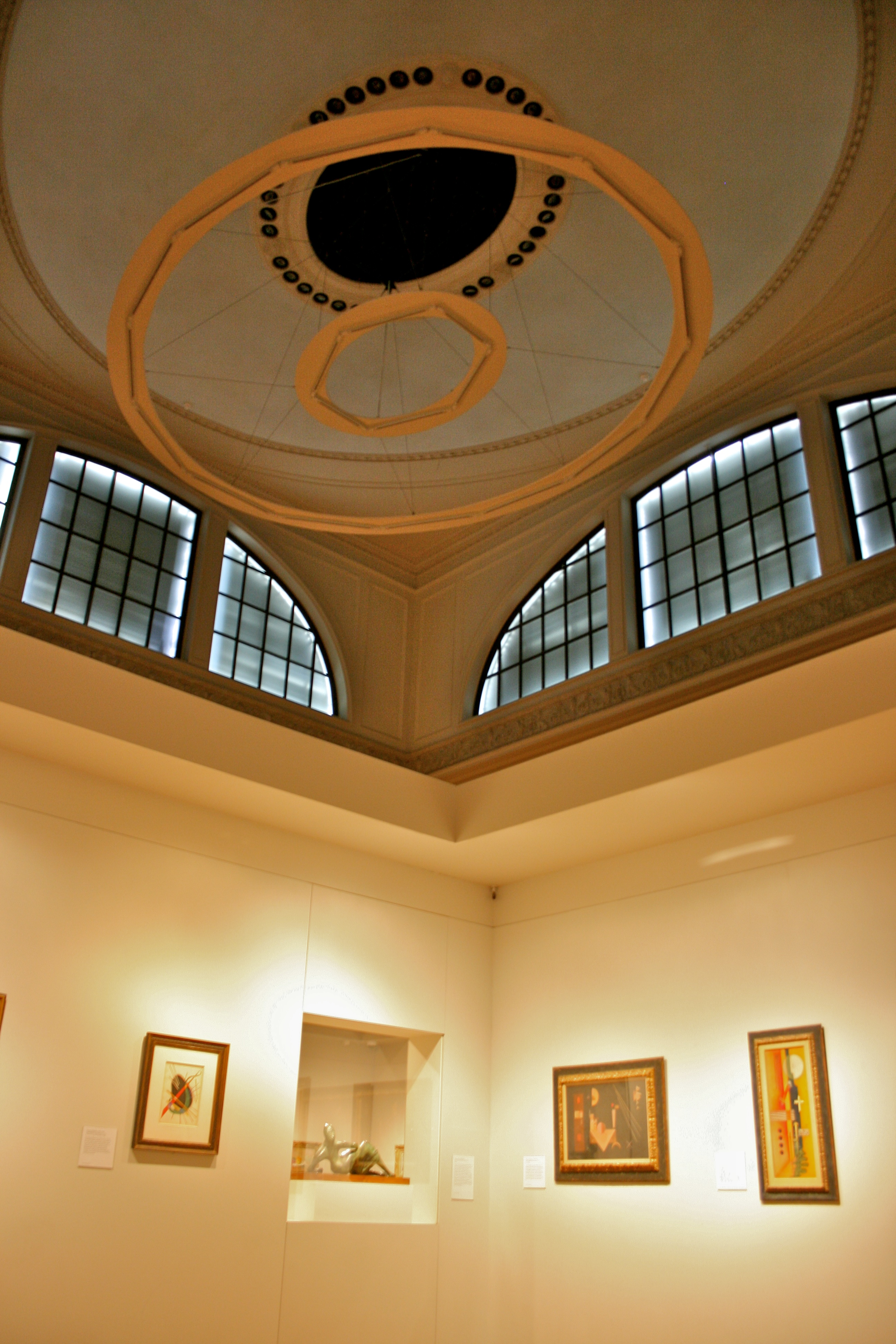
Former Exhibition Room (Now part of Courtauld Galleries), Somerset House, London

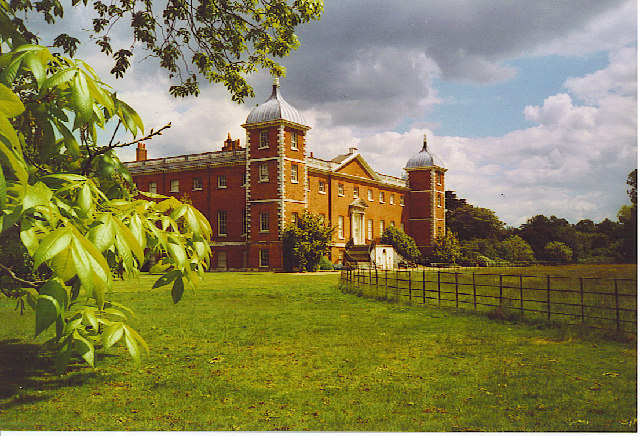
West front, Osterley House, rest of building by Robert Adam

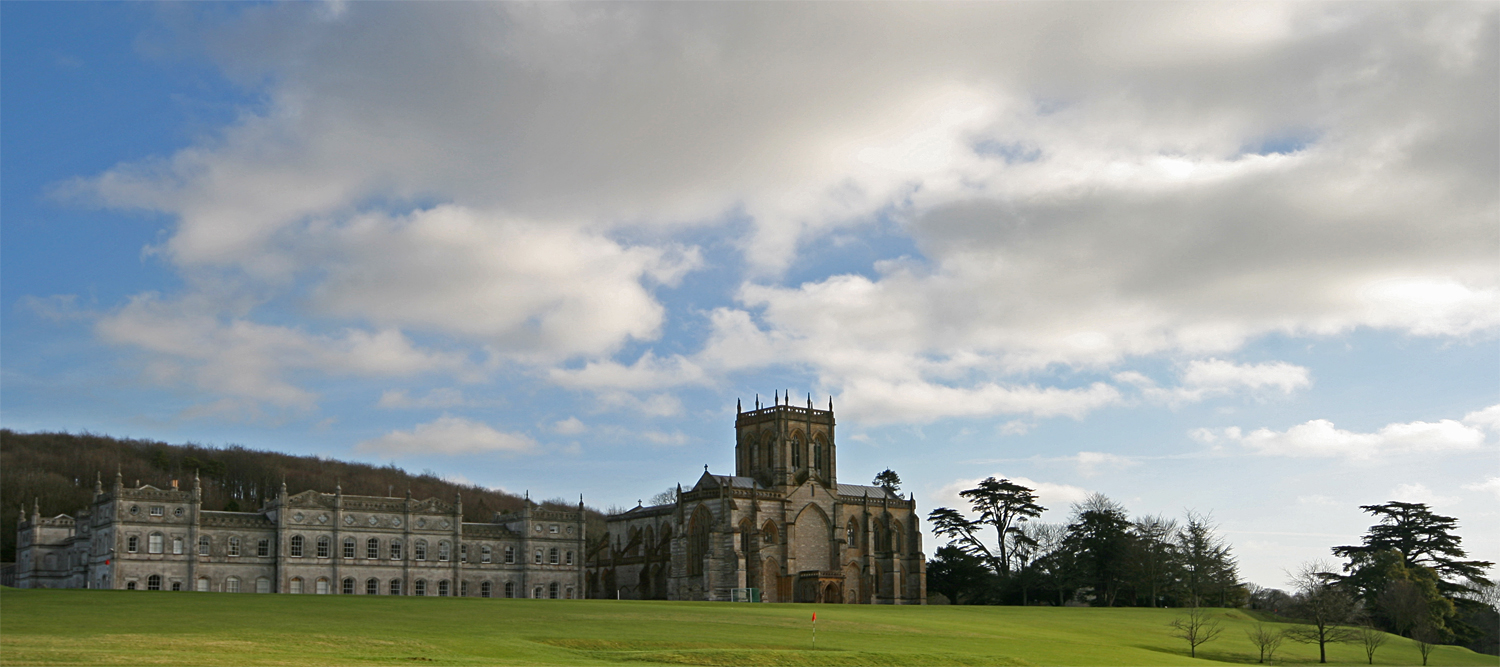
Milton Abbey, Dorset, Chamber's house to left of church

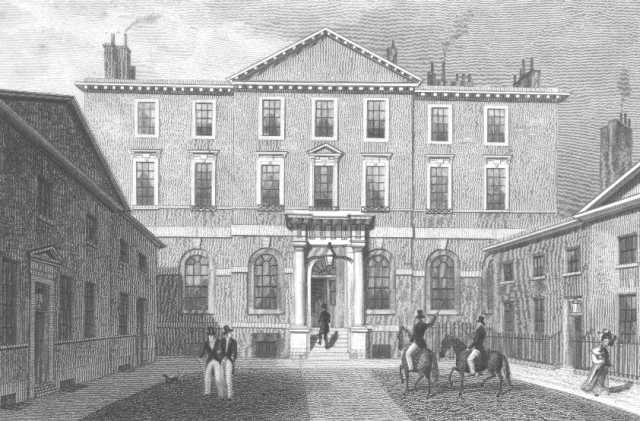
Melbourne House (Later Albany), London

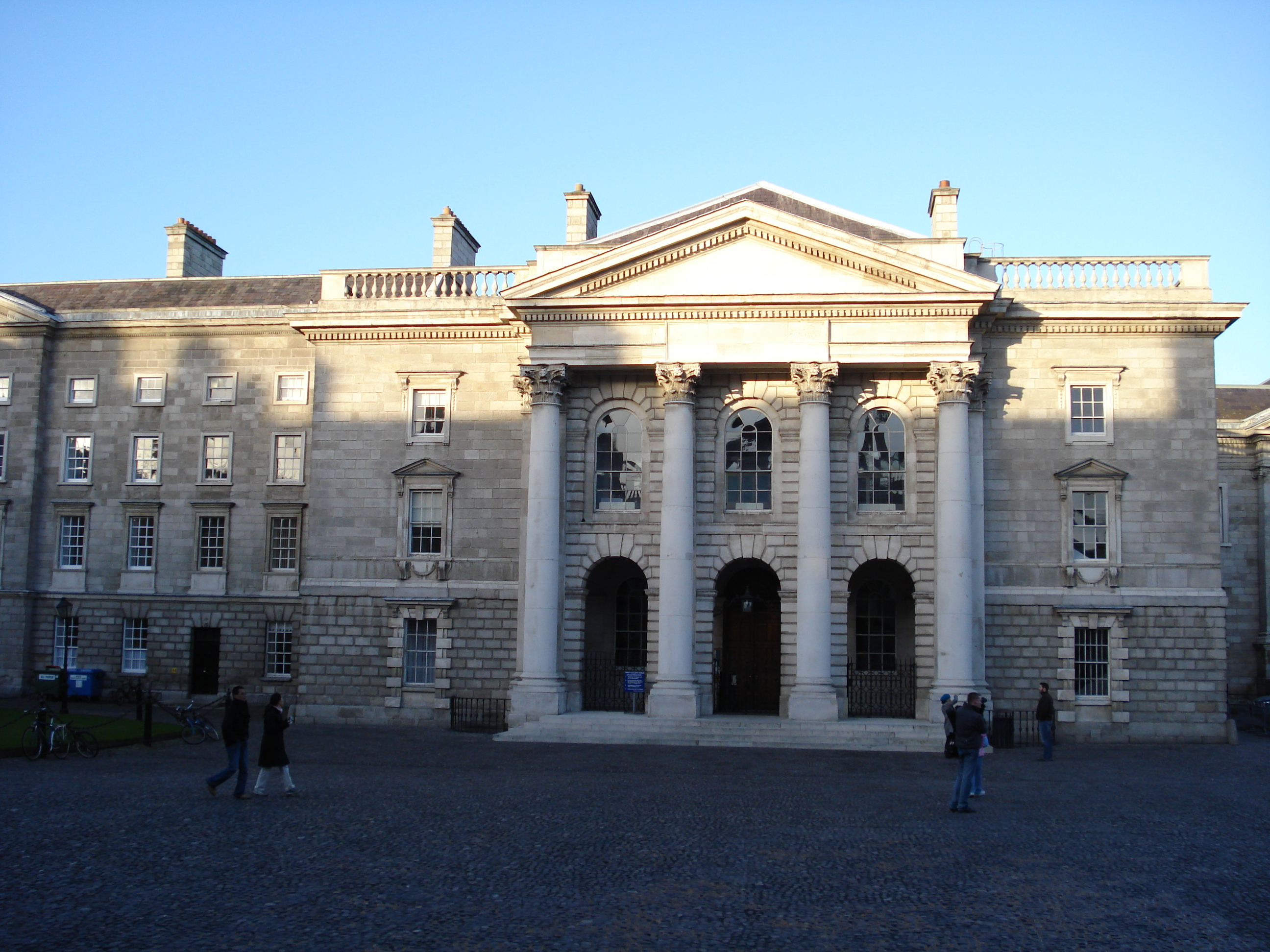
the Chapel, Trinity College, Dublin

== Notes ==
Court offices
Preceded by Henry Flitcroft	Comptroller of the King's Works; 1769–1782	Succeeded by (post merged)

Court offices
Preceded by (new position)	Surveyor-General and Comptroller; 1782–1796	Succeeded by James Wyatt
