= North Moreton =

Village in Oxfordshire, England

Coordinates: 51.602°N 1.192°W

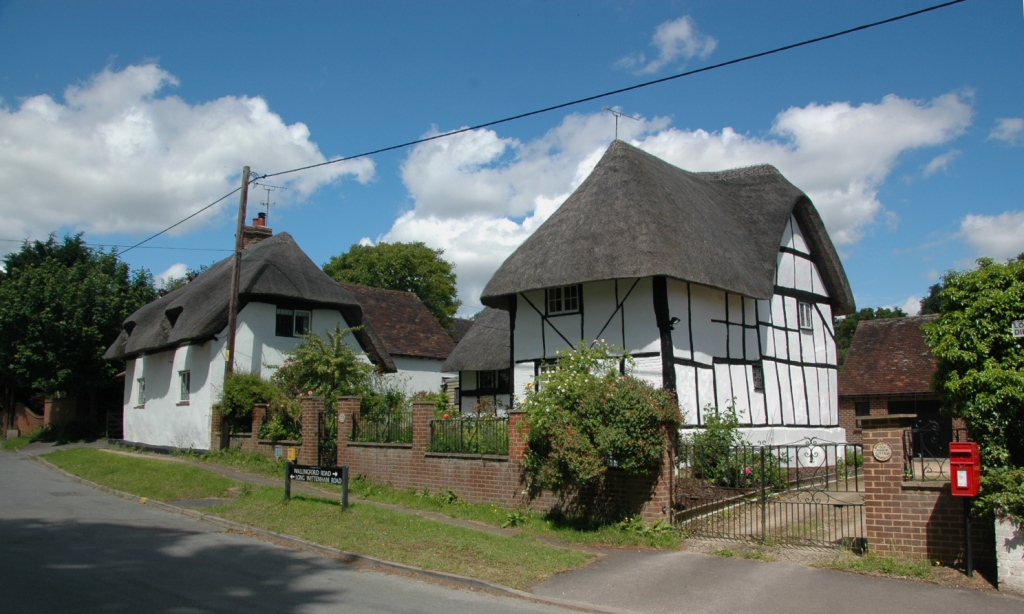
- Thatched cottages in Church Street

- Location within Oxfordshire
- Area: 4.45 km^{2} (1.72 sq mi)
- Population: 328 (2011 Census)
  - Density: 74/km^{2} (190/sq mi)
- OS grid reference: SU560895
- Civil parish: North Moreton
- District: South Oxfordshire
- Shire county: Oxfordshire
- Region: South East
- Country: England
- Sovereign state: United Kingdom
- Post town: Didcot
- Postcode district: OX11
- Dialling code: 01235
- Police: Thames Valley
- Fire: Oxfordshire
- Ambulance: South Central
- UK Parliament: Didcot and Wantage
- Website: North Moreton

North Moreton is a village and civil parish about 2 miles (3 km) east of Didcot. It was part of Wallingford Rural District in Berkshire until the 1974 boundary changes transferred it to the new South Oxfordshire District of Oxfordshire. The 2011 Census recorded the parish's population as 328.

== Parish church ==
The Church of England parish church of All Saints was built in the 13th century and the chantry chapel of the Stapleton family was added in the 14th century. This has geometrical tracery, carving outside, and an east window filled with 14th century stained glass showing the Passion of Christ and incidents in the lives of the Virgin Mary, Saint Peter, Saint Paul and Saint Nicholas. All Saints' is a Grade I listed building.

The west tower has a ring of five bells. The fourth bell was cast at Wokingham, Berkshire, in about 1350. Joseph Carter of the Whitechapel Bell Foundry cast the tenor bell in 1591. Ellis I Knight of Reading cast the treble bell in 1641. Richard Keene of Woodstock cast the third bell in 1684. Thomas II Mears of the Whitechapel Bell Foundry cast the second bell in 1817. All Saints' also has a Sanctus bell cast by Lester and Pack of the Whitechapel Bell Foundry in 1757. All Saints' parish is part of the Churn benefice.

== Case of Anne Gunter ==
Brian Gunter leased the rectory at North Moreton, living there with his family. In 1598 he caused fatal injuries to two brothers of the Gregory family during a brawl at a football match. In 1604 his daughter, Anne Gunter, suffering from vomiting and fits, complained of witchcraft initiated by the Gregory family. A Star Chamber case later found that Brian Gunter had persuaded his daughter to pretend that she was possessed.

== Amenities ==
North Moreton has a pub, the Bear Inn. Thames Travel route 94 provides a limited service to North Moreton from Mondays to Fridays, linking the village with Didcot town and with Didcot Parkway railway station. Buses run only during school terms, and there is no Saturday or Sunday service.

== Sources ==
- Betjeman, John, ed. (1968). The South. Collins Pocket Guide to English Parish Churches. London: Collins. p. 114.
- Howat, Gerald (2000). A History of North Moreton. North Moreton: North Moreton Press. ISBN 0-9506957-4-2.
- Page, W.H.; Ditchfield, P.H., eds. (1923). A History of the County of Berkshire. Victoria County History. Vol. 3. assisted by John Hautenville Cope. London: The St Katherine Press. pp. 492–498.
- Pevsner, Nikolaus (1966). Berkshire. The Buildings of England. Harmondsworth: Penguin Books. pp. 186–187.
