= Ludovick Grant of Grant =

Scottish politician and soldier

Ludovick Grant, 1st of Grant and 8th of Freuchie (1641–1717) was a Scottish politician and soldier. He was the 19th Chief of Clan Grant and referred to as the "Highland King".

Arms of Grant of Grant

== Biography ==
Grant was born at Freuchie Castle c. 1641, the eldest son of James Grant, 7th of Freuchie and Lady Mary Stewart, the daughter of James Stewart, 3rd Earl of Moray and Lady Anne Gordon, the daughter of George Gordon, 1st Marquess of Huntly. His brother was Patrick Grant of Wester Elchies, progenitor of that clan branch. After his father died, he was raised under the guardianship of his uncle Patrick Grant, who thus became known as the 'Tutor of Grant'. On 23 May 1665, he was retoured heir to his father in all the lands of Freuchie, Mulben, Urquhart, and others, in accordance with the Royal precept.

Grant was an active parliamentarian who sat as Member of Parliament for Elginshire from 1681 onwards. On one occasion at parliament he insisted that his dissatisfaction with an Act of Parliament be noted for the record. The Duke of York was said to have remarked sarcastically: "Let his Highland Majesty's protest be marked." From then onwards, Grant was referred to as the "Highland King". Charles II intended to make Grant the 'Earl of Strathspey', but this never materialized.

In 1671 he married Janet, the daughter of Alexander Brodie, 2nd of Lethen (died 1688). His eldest son Brigadier General Alexander Grant, 2nd of Grant died in 1719. He was thus succeeded by the second eldest son Sir James Grant, 6th Baronet. His younger sons were Major George Grant of Culbin who was governor of Fort George and Colonel Ludovick Grant who was a planter and slave owner in Jamaica. His daughter Margaret was married to Simon 'the Fox' Fraser, 11th Lord Lovat. His daughter Janet was married to Sir Roderick Mackenzie, 2nd Baronet and 5th of Scatwell.

Grant led his clan during the 1689 Rising and raised a regiment on the side of the Williamite government, commanding a force of around 700 men. At the Battle of Cromdale on 30 April 1690 the Jacobites were defeated by Sir Thomas Livingstone. Grant later supported the Hanoverian succession. On 28 February 1694 he was awarded by William III with a royal charter for the 'regality of Grant', which was centered on the renamed and rebuilt Castle Grant, thus becoming Ludovic Grant, 1st of Grant – the 'Highland King'.

== Sources ==
- Fraser, William (1883). The Chiefs of Grant. Histories of Scottish families. Vol. 1.
- Mackenzie, Alexander (1894). History of the Mackenzies with Genealogies of the Principal Families of the Name. Inverness: A. & W. Mackenzie.
