= James Grant of Freuchie =

Scottish landowner

James Grant, 7th of Freuchie (1616–1663) was a Scottish landowner, the seventh Laird of Freuchie. He was the 18th Chief of Clan Grant.

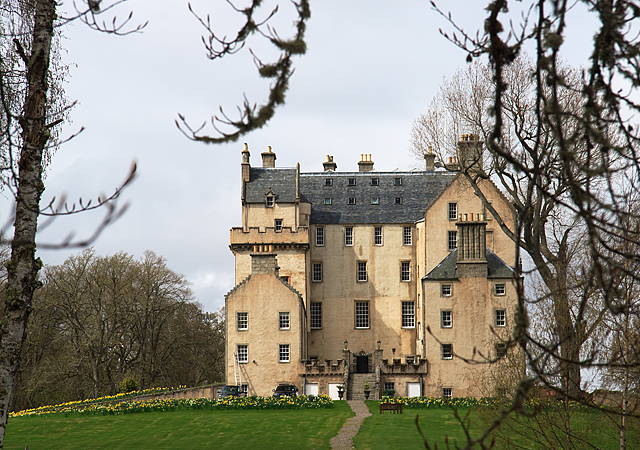
Freuchie Castle, or Ballachastell, renamed, in 1694, Castle Grant

== Career ==
He was a son of John Grant of Freuchie and Mary, daughter of Walter Ogilvie of Findlater. A note written by his grandmother, Lilias Murray, indicates he was born on 24 June 1616. He became Laird of Freuchie on the death of his father in 1637.

Grant signed the Scottish Covenant and bought blue ribbons for himself and his followers in Aberdeen in 1639 to show his support.

His father, John Grant of Freuchie, had employed John Anderson to paint the gallery of Castle Grant with "fine colours" and gild the "storm" or dormer windows in 1635. James Grant employed two masons in 1649, Robert Torrie and James Mason, to rebuild and heighten two smoking chimneys at Castle Grant and improve the leaking battlements of the two old towers. Grant employed a fowler, John Innes, to hunt to hunt water-fowl and partridges with dogs for his table. Music at Castle Grant was provided by Alexander Cumming, a piper and viola player. His wife, Mary Stewart, Lady Grant, was supplied with flour and aqua vitae by John Paterson and William Farquhar, burgesses of Forres.

After the Restoration of Charles II, the Laird of Freuchie was obliged to send workmen with tools and wheelbarrows to help demolish the fortified citadel or sconce of Inverness. The workforce was led by John Grant of Craggan.

Many letters and documents from the Grant family papers were printed by William Fraser in the Chiefs of Grant in 1883. The family archive is now held by the National Records of Scotland.

== Portraits, witchcraft, and coral beads ==
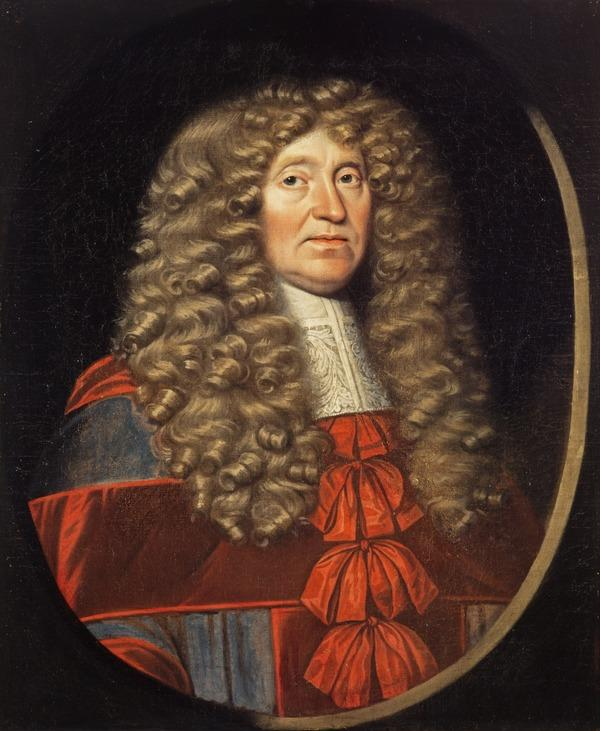
The Clerk of the Privy Council, Peter Wedderburn, helped James Grant organise a witch trial

In 1658 and 1661 he and his family went to Edinburgh and had portraits made by David Scougall. They visited Donibristle House in Fife. Travel involved a "sedan chair" and a "chariot" for his wife, Mary, Lady Grant, who seems to have had a disability. The visit to Edinburgh in 1661 also concerned legal arrangements for a witchcraft trial. James Grant had employed a witch pricker to extract confessions from suspects. He sought advice from Sir Peter Wedderburn (1616–1679, later Lord Gosford), and went to the Privy Council in October to obtain a commission for a witch trial. Mary, Lady Grant, is said to have believed that witches were intending to harm her children. Alexander Brodie, Laird of Brodie had recorded her fear of witchcraft in 1655 in his diary.

On 3 October 1661, a commission for trying Issobell Munro and Mary Burges, two women described as "vagabonds", for witchcraft in "Strathspey and Murrayland" was issued. They had already confessed to having made a "paction with the devil", and may have been among those suspected of witchcraft by Lady Grant.

James Grant died in 1663 at Edinburgh, where he was helping a relative, Allan Grant of Tulloch, who was on trial for manslaughter. He was buried at Holyrood Abbey. The portraits (dated 1658) are now held by the National Museums of Scotland. Lady Grant holds an apple pomander and wears bracelets of beads of coral, amber, or red cornelian. These were perhaps an amulet offering magical protection against accident, disease or death.

== Marriage and children ==
James Grant broke off an engagement with Lady Jane Fleming, a daughter of the Earl of Wigtown. Around the 24 April 1640, he married Lady Mary Stuart (died 1662), a daughter of James Stuart, 3rd Earl of Moray and Anne Gordon, Countess of Moray. She was usually noted as "Lady Mary" in household accounts. There was some opposition to the marriage, and Grant married her in Elgin, where she was staying at the Moray family lodging, in the absence of her brother James Stuart, 4th Earl of Moray and family. The minister who celebrated the wedding, Gilbert Marshall, was suspended for three weeks for not making a proclamation giving notice of this wedding.

Their children included:

- Ludovick Grant, 1st of Grant, who married (1) Janet Brodie (died 1697), a daughter of Alexander Brodie of Lethen, and (2) Jean Houston, a daughter of John Houston, and widow of Richard Lockhart of Lee. His heir was Alexander Grant.
- Patrick Grant of Wester Elchies
- Anna Grant, who married Patrick Ogilvie of Boyne
- Mary Grant, who married Alexander Hamilton of Haggs
- Margaret Grant, who married Roderick MacKenzie of Redcastle
