= Clan Grant =

Highland Scottish clan

- Clann Grannd
- Crest: An image of a burning hill.
- Motto: Stand Fast
- Slogan: "Craig Elachie!"

Profile
- District: Strathspey, Glen Urquhart, Glenmoriston and Loch Ness.
- Plant badge: Pine
- Pipe music: Stand fast Craigellachie

Chief
- The Rt. Hon. Michael Grant of Grant
- The 7th Lord Strathspey
- Historic seat: Castle Grant
Clan branches
Grant of Grant (chiefs)
Grant of Glenmoriston (senior cadets)
Grant of Wester Elchies
Grant of Kinchirdie, Gellovie, Knockando, Gartinbeg
Grant of Easter Elchies
Grant of Lurg in Abernethy
Grant of Rothiemurchus
Grant (second) of Ballindalloch
Grant of Monymusk
Grant of Arndilly
Grant of Corriemony in Glenurquhart
Grant of Sheuglie
Grant of Tullochgorm
Grant (first) of Ballindalloch and Dalvey
Grant of Carron
Grant of Wester Elchies (Glenmoriston)
Grant of Gartinbeg, Kinveachy, Dalrachnie, Inverlaidnan, Dalvey
Grant of Kilgraston
See also:
Grant baronets
Allied clans
Clan Gordon
Clan MacGregor
Clan Fraser of Lovat
Clan Campbell
Rival clans
Clan Cameron
Clan Chisholm
Clan Comyn

Clan Grant is a Highland Scottish clan, with one main branch, Grant of Grant, and several cadet branches, such as Grant of Glenmoriston.

== History ==
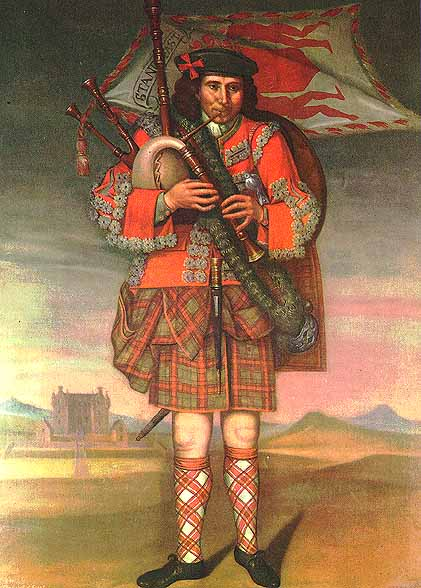
Clan Grant piper, 1714

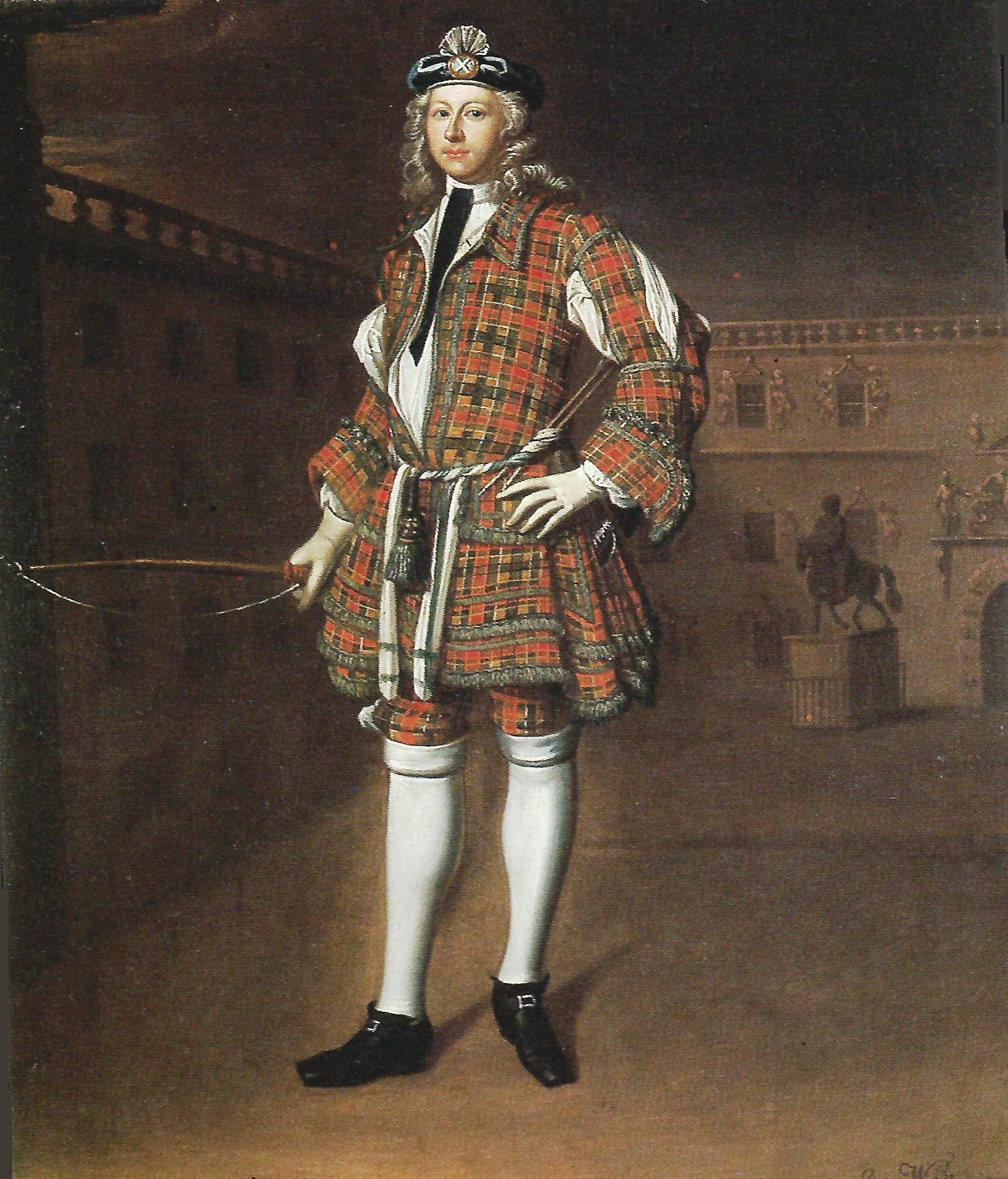
A Grant officer of the Royal Company of Archers, 1715

=== Origins ===
The Chiefs of Clan Grant descended from Normans who arrived in Scotland during the medieval period, bearing the French name le Grand ('the tall', 'large'). The first Grants to appear in Scotland are recorded in the 13th century when they acquired the lands of Stratherrick. Sir Laurence le Grant, son of Gregory le Grant, was Sheriff of Inverness.

=== Wars of Scottish Independence ===
During the Wars of Scottish Independence, Clan Grant were supporters of William Wallace, and John and Randolph Grant were captured at the Battle of Dunbar (1296). The Clan Grant later supported Robert the Bruce in competition for the Scottish Crown. The victory of Robert the Bruce confirmed the Grants in their lands of Strathspey, where they became established Highland chiefs.

The acquisition of Castle Grant occurred during the 14th century. Originally a Clan Comyn stronghold, tradition holds that the castle was taken from the Comyns by a combined force of Grants and MacGregors.

=== 15th and 16th centuries ===
The next available reference is of Duncan le Grant in 1434, and later, Sir Duncan Grant of Freuchie (Castle Grant), who inherited land in Dulnain valley in upper Speyside from his mother, Matilda of Glencarnie. Her family had partially owned it since 1180, when the Crown gave Kinveachy (approximately ten miles southwest of Castle Grant) to Gille Brigte, Earl of Strathearn.

By the 16th century the clan and its chief had become powerful enough to play a part in national politics. Their main allies being the Clan Gordon, whose chief was the powerful Earl of Huntly.

In 1535 James Grant, 3rd Laird of Freuchie was made responsible for the policing of Strathspey.

In 1580 Robert Grant, champion of the Grants, defeated an English champion at a jousting tournament while on an embassy in England. Towards the end of the 16th century the Grants began to quarrel with their old allies the Gordons, over religion. The Grants being Protestant and the Gordons being Catholic.

In 1586 the Earl of Huntly allied with the Clan MacDonald and Clan Cameron who both had a history of raiding the Grant's lands. The Grants responded by bringing in the Clan Gregor but they came off worse in a clash at Ballindalloch. By the late 16th century, Clan Grant had become an important clan in the Scottish Highlands. During this period, the clan's actions resulted in the murder of the Earl of Moray and the defeat of the Earl of Argyll at the Battle of Glenlivet in 1594. The Chief of Clan Grant ordered his men to retreat as soon as the action began. This treacherous move led to the defeat of Clan Campbell of Argyll.

=== 17th century and Civil War ===
In 1613 King James VI of Scotland wrote to John Grant of Freuchie chief of Clan Grant complaining that he was sheltering outlaws from the Clan MacGregor. The chief responded by sending the notorious Alistair MacAllister MacGregor to Edinburgh. However, the King was not satisfied and in 1615 fined Grant 16,000 merks for protecting the MacGregors.

James Grant of Carron was an outlaw of the early 17th century because of an internal feud within the Clan Grant.

During the 1639–1651 Wars of the Three Kingdoms, Captain David Grant led his forces in support of the Covenanter forces against the Royalist forces at the Battle of Tippermuir in 1644. In October 1645, Clan Cameron raided the lands of the Clan Grant. The Grants gave chase catching the Camerons in the Battle of the Braes of Strathdearn, where the Cameron men were defeated and many clansmen were slain.

In 1651 James Grant, 7th of Freuchie, 18th Chief, led the clan as a Covenanter and suffered much as a result. He later supported the Marquis of Montrose. Also, an alliance between Grant and the Earl of Huntly led to the annihilation of the Clan Farquharson.

==== 1689 rising ====
In 1689 Ludovic Grant, 8th of Freuchie, 19th Chief, referred to as the "Highland King", was a supporter of William of Orange and later also supported the Hanoverian succession. Led by their Chief, the majority of the Clan were steadfast Loyalists. The Grants of Glenmoriston however were committed Jacobites throughout the period, notably fighting at the Battle of Killiecrankie in July 1689. Clan Grant provided the bulk of the Williamite force under Sir Thomas Livingstone, that defeated the Jacobites at the Battle of Cromdale in May 1690.

=== 18th century and Jacobite uprisings ===
==== 1715 rising ====
During the Jacobite rising of 1715 the main part of the Clan Grant supported the British Government. In 1715 the Laird of Grant withdrew his forces which led to the defeat of government forces at the Skirmish of Alness. However, soon after the Clan Grant helped retake Inverness from the Jacobites during Siege of Inverness (1715). In 1715 the fighting force of the Clan Grant was given as 850 men by General George Wade. At the Battle of Sheriffmuir in 1715, Grants fought on both sides. The British government forces won the battle with many of the Jacobites surrendering to General Alexander Grant, 2nd of Grant, 20th Chief.

==== Black Watch ====
General Wade's report on the Highlands in 1724, estimated the clan strength at 800 men. In 1725, six Independent Highland Companies (Black Watch) were formed to support the Government. One from Clan Grant, one from Clan Fraser of Lovat, one from Clan Munro and three from Clan Campbell. In 1739, ten Independent Highland Companies were formed into the 43rd Highlanders (Black Watch) regiment.

==== 1745 rising ====
During the Jacobite rising of 1745 the Chief of Clan Grant again supported the British Government, as did most of the Clan. However once again he withdrew his troops which again led to the defeat of government forces, this time at the Battle of Inverurie (1745).

One branch of the Clan Grant, the Grants of Glenmoriston, sided with the Jacobites during the '45. They fought at the Battle of Prestonpans in 1745 and are credited with winning the day due to their timely reinforcement. The Grant of Glenmoriston branch also fought as Jacobites at the Battle of Culloden in 1746 under the command of the Duke of Perth. Eighty-four Grants of Glenmoriston were captured at Culloden and were transported to Barbados, in violation of their terms of surrender, where they were sold as indentured servants.

At the Siege of Inverness (1746) the commander of the British-Hanoverian Government forces was Major George Grant, whilst amongst the Jacobite commanders was Colonel James Grant.

=== Highland clearances ===
Clan Grant was one of the few clans not to be affected by the Highland Clearances. The "Good Sir James" Grant (Clan Chief from 1773 to 1811) built the town of Grantown-on-Spey for the express purpose of providing for his clansmen to keep them from having to emigrate. While other Highlanders were emigrating in the face of the changes that were sweeping away the old Highland way of life, Sir James Grant was busy building an entire town, building schools, mills, factories, a hospital, an orphanage, etc. to provide for his Clan. Grantown-on-Spey is a monument to Sir James's loyalty to his clansmen.

=== British Army Regiments ===
During the later part of the 18th century two regiments were raised from the Clan Grant. Firstly the "Strathspey Fencibles" (otherwise known as the "Grant Fencibles") in 1793 and the "97th Regiment of Foot (Inverness-shire Highlanders)" (or "Strathspey Regiment") in 1794. The first was disbanded in 1799 and the second was used as marines on board Lord Howe's fleet and later drafted into other regiments in 1795.

=== President Grant ===
On his world tour in 1877, Ulysses S. Grant came to Scotland and he was accepted as a returning member of Clan Grant.

=== 21st century ===
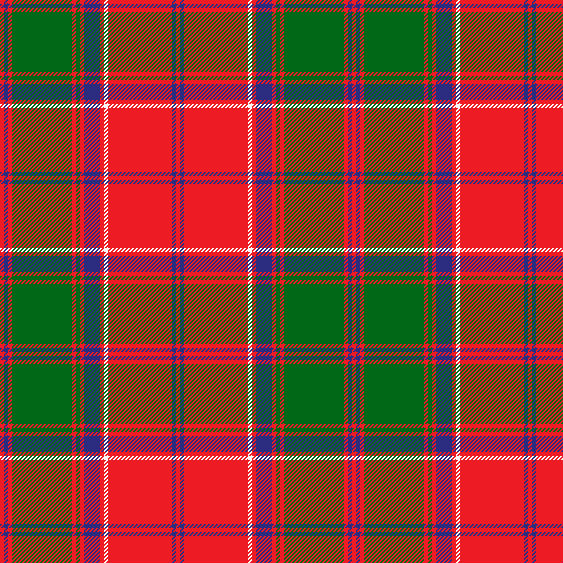
Clan Grant tartan.

Duthil Old Parish Church and Churchyard, which lies just outside the village of Duthil, Inverness-shire, now serves as a Clan Grant Centre. The site includes many memorials to clan members, such as Field Marshal Sir Patrick Grant, GCB GCMG (1804–1895), as well as a mausoleum of the Earls of Seafield.

During a visit to Winnipeg, Canada in July 2012, the chief of Clan Grant declared that Métis leader Cuthbert Grant was a member of the clan. This created a new sept of Clan Grant in Canada. Visitors came from as far away as Scotland as well as from the Yukon, Montana and Manitoba where Grant descendants settled to take part in events arranged for Lord Strathspey's time in Canada.

== Castles ==
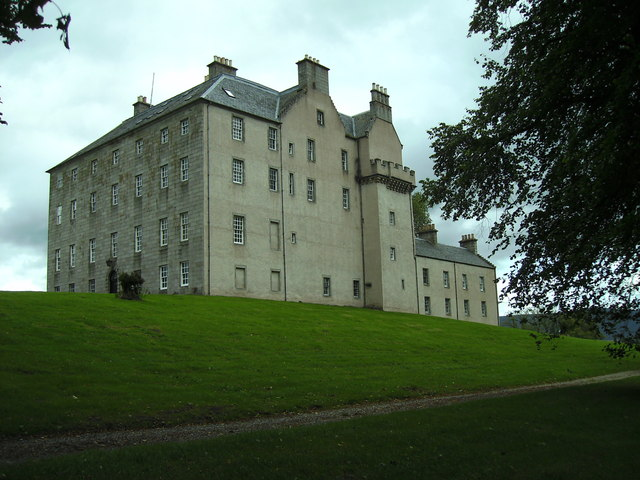
Castle Grant, former seat of the chief of Clan Grant

- Castle Grant was the seat of the Chief of Clan Grant.
- Muckrach Castle was the seat of the Grants of Rothiemurchus.
- Urquhart Castle owned by the Clan Grant from 1509, to 1912.
- Ballindalloch Castle was owned by the Grants from 1499 onwards.
- Loch an Eilein Castle, near Aviemore came into the possession of the Grants in 1567. It was attacked by Jacobites after their defeat at the Battle of Cromdale in 1690, but was successfully defended.

== Chief ==
Coat of arms of Lord Strathspey, Chief of Clan Grant, with the badge of a baronet of Nova Scotia

The current Chief of Clan Grant is the Rt Hon The Lord Strathspey (Sir Michael Grant of Grant, Bt, 7th Baron Strathspey, 34th hereditary Clan chief of Clan Grant).

| No. | Name | Died | Details |
|---|---|---|---|
| X | Sir John Roy Grant | 1434 | Son of IX. Married Matilda de Glencarnie. Sheriff of Inverness. |
| XI | Sir Duncan Grant, 1st of Freuchie | 1495 | Son of X. Married Muriel Mackintosh, daughter of Malcolm Mackintosh of Mackintosh. |
| XIII | John Grant, 2nd of Freuchie | 1528 | Son of XII. Married Margaret Ogilvie, daughter of Sir James Ogilvie of Deskford. |
| XIV | James Grant, 3rd of Freuchie | 1553 | Son of XIII. Married Elizabeth Forbes, daughter of the 6th Lord Forbes. |
| XV | John Grant, 4th of Freuchie | 1585 | Son of XV. Married Lady Margaret Stewart, daughter of the 3rd Earl of Atholl. |
| XVI | John Grant, 5th of Freuchie | 1622 | Grandson of XV. Married Lady Lilias Murray, daughter of the 1st Earl of Tullibardine. |
| XVII | Sir John Grant, 6th of Freuchie | 1637 | Son of XVI. Married Mary Ogilvie, daughter of the 1st Lord Ogilvie of Deskford. |
| XVIII | James Grant, 7th of Freuchie | 1663 | Son of XVII. Married Lady Mary Stuart, daughter of the 3rd Earl of Moray. |
| XIX | Ludovic Grant of Grant | 1717 | Son of XVIII. Married Janet Brodie, daughter of Alexander Brodie of Lethuen. Known as the “Highland King”. |
| XX | Gen. Alexander Grant of Grant | 1719 | Son of XIX. Died without issue. |
| XXI | Sir James Grant of Grant, 6th Baronet | 1747 | Son of XIX. Married Anne Colquhoun, daughter of Sir Humphrey Colquhoun, 5th Baronet. |
| XXII | Sir Ludovic Grant of Grant, 7th Baronet | 1773 | Son of XXI. Married Lady Margaret Ogilvie, daughter of the 2nd Earl of Seafield. |
| XXIII | Sir James Grant of Grant, 8th Baronet | 1810 | Son of XXII. Married Jean Duff, granddaughter of the 1st Earl Fife. Known as the “Good Sir James”, he founded Grantown-on-Spey. |
| XXIV | Lewis Alexander Ogilvie-Grant, 5th Earl of Seafield | 1840 | Son of XXIII. Died unmarried. |
| XXV | Col. Francis William Ogilvie-Grant, 6th Earl of Seafield | 1853 | Son of XXIII. Married, firstly, Mary Anne Dunn, daughter of John Dunn; secondly, Louisa Maunsell, of Limerick. |
| XXVI | John Charles Ogilvie-Grant, 7th Earl of Seafield KT | 1881 | Son of XXV. Married Hon. Caroline Stuart, daughter of the 11th Lord Blantyre. |
| XXVII | Ian Charles Ogilvie-Grant, 8th Earl of Seafield | 1884 | Son of XXVI. Died unmarried. |
| XXVIII | Lt.-Col. James Ogilvie-Grant, 9th Earl of Seafield | 1888 | Son of XXV. Married, firstly, Caroline Evans, daughter of Eyre Evans, MP of Limerick; secondly, Constance Abercromby, daughter of Sir Robert Abercromby, 5th Baronet; and, thirdly, Georgina Forestier-Walker, sister of Gen. Edward Forestier-Walker. |
| XXIX | Francis William Ogilvie-Grant, 10th Earl of Seafield | 1888 | Son of XXVIII. Married his cousin Anne Evans, daughter of Maj. George Evans, of Oamaru, New Zealand. |
| XXX | Capt. James Ogilvie-Grant, 11th Earl of Seafield | 1915 | Son of XXIX. Married Nina Townend, daughter of Dr. Joseph Townend, of Christchurch, New Zealand. He was killed during World War I serving with the Queen's Own Cameron Highlanders. His daughter Nina inherited the Seafield title and estate. |
| XXXI | Trevor Ogilvie-Grant, 4th Baron Strathspey | 1948 | Son of XXIX. Married Alice Hardy-Johnston, daughter of Thomas Hardy-Johnston, of Christchurch, New Zealand. |
| XXXII | Patrick Trevor Grant of Grant, 5th Baron Strathspey | 1992 | Son of XXXI. |
| XXXIII | James Patrick Trevor Grant of Grant, 6th Baron Strathspey | 2023 | Son of XXXII. |
| XXXIV | Michael Francis Trevor Grant of Grant, 7th Baron Strathspey | | Son of XXXII. Current clan chief. Heir presumptive is his cousin, The Rt.-Hon. Earl of Seafield (assuming there is no contest and Seafield adopts the style Grant of Grant). |

== Crest and arms ==
The burning hill crest represents "Craig Elachie", the rallying point for the Grants. When signal fires were lit upon the summit of Craig Elachie, or "The Rock of Alarm", members of the clan would gather there in order to organise for an attack or defence.

The arms of Baron Strathspey as matriculated by the 32nd Chief in 1950 are shown above : Gules three antique crowns Or in the dexter canton Argent a saltire Azure surmounted of an inescutcheon Or charged with a lion rampant within a double tressure flory counter flory being the addition of a Nova Scotia as a baronet.

== In fiction ==
Clan Grant featured heavily in the 2025 TV series Outlander: Blood of My Blood.
