= Craigellachie National Nature Reserve =

Nature reserve in Scotland

- IUCN category IV (habitat/species management area)
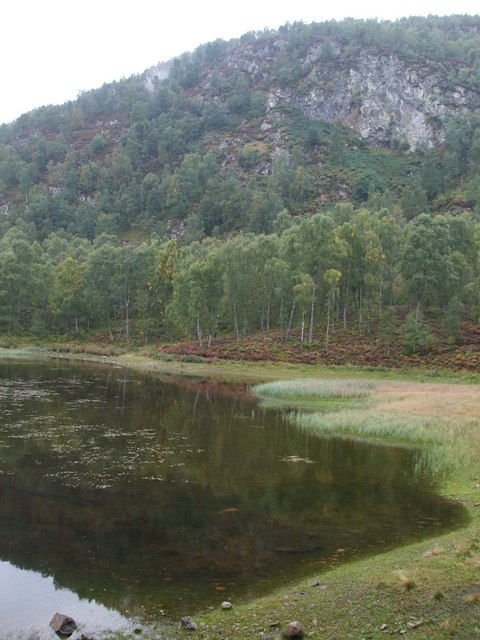
- Lochan and woodland at Craigellachie

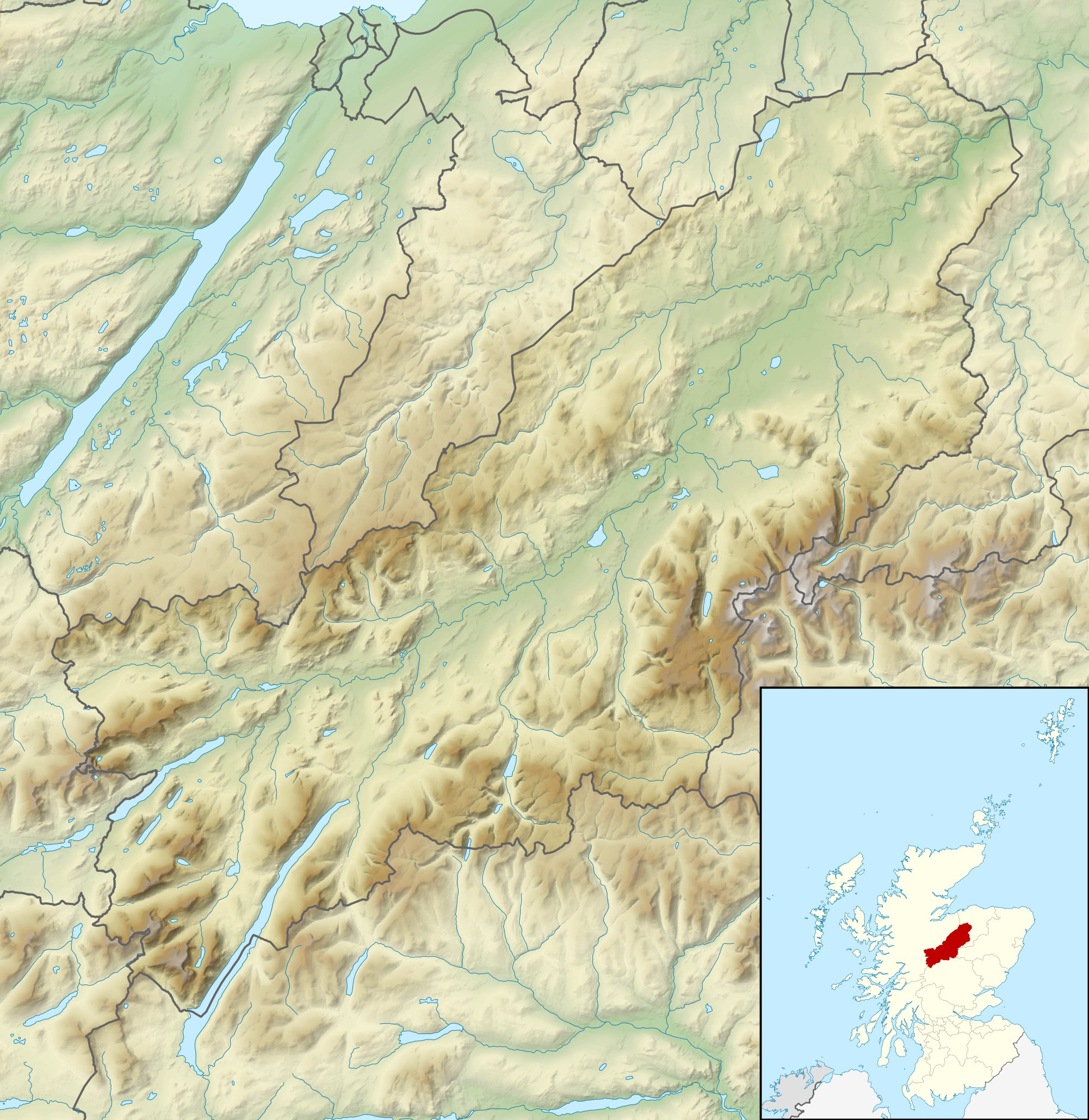
- Location within Badenoch and Strathspey
- Location: Near Aviemore, Scotland
- Coordinates: 57.188948°N 3.848020°W
- Area: 257 ha (640 acres)
- Established: 1961
- Governing body: NatureScot
- Website: Craigellachie National Nature Reserve

Craigellachie (Scottish Gaelic: Chreag Eileachaidh) is a hill lying to the west of the village of Aviemore in Strathspey, in the central Highlands of Scotland. Craigellachie was declared a national nature reserve (NNR) in 1961, and is managed by NatureScot through a lease from Reidhaven Estate. The reserve covers 257 hectares on the eastern slopes of the Monadhliath range of hills, lying between 225 and 535 m above sea level. It is dominated by birkwood (birch woodland), being one of the largest remaining areas of this type of habitat on Speyside, and is also of national importance due to the variety of moths present on the reserve. In addition to the birkwoods, the reserve encompasses a variety of other habitats, such as rocky crags, lochans and open heath with blaeberry.

By tradition Craigellachie was an important place for Clan Grant, being used as a vantage point and as the site for signal fires to gather the clan. Craigellachie appears on the clan's crest, and the clan's Slogan is "Stand fast Craig Elachie!".

== Flora and fauna ==
The birkwood at Craigellachie NNR can be described as "semi-natural", having arisen before the middle of the eighteenth century: the earliest known reference to it was made by mapmaker William Roy in 1750. Many of the birch trees are around 100 years old, and are almost entirely silver birch, although some downy birch is found in areas with poorly drained, peaty soils. Other tree found at the reserve include aspen, rowan, hazel, bird cherry, eared willow, grey willow, Scots pine and juniper.

The range of habitats supports a diverse range of plant communities, with over 385 flowering-plant types being recorded at the reserve, including nationally-scarce species such as least waterlily, serrated wintergreen, dwarf birch, and bog hair grass. 71 species of fungi and 22 lichen species have been recorded at the reserve, owing to the birchwood habitat.

The reserve provides an ideal habitat for invertebrate species and is home to a number of nationally important moth species, 13 of which are UK Biodiversity Action Plan (UKBAP) species. Of particular note are the Kentish glory and Rannoch sprawler, the larvae of which favour young birch saplings as a food source. Woodland butterflies at Craigellachie NNR include Scotch argus and orange tip, as well as the pearl-bordered fritillary, which is also a UKBAP species.

Around 50 bird species are present, including a number of UKBAP species, such as spotted flycatcher, song thrush, bullfinch, lesser redpoll, tree pipit, red grouse and black grouse. Furthermore, a pair of peregrine falcons nest on the crags, which can be viewed through a webcam in the visitor centre section of the Aviemore Youth Hostel. Mammal species found at Craigellachie include red and roe deer, pipistrelle bats, and occasional sightings of pine marten.

== Visitors ==
Around 8500 people each year visit the reserve, which is linked to the centre of Aviemore via an underpass beneath the A9. There are four marked trails, three of which provide circular routes of between 0.7 and 1.8 km. The fourth trail, which is 4.4 km long, continues up to the summit of Craigellachie. In 2007 a ‘Mobitour’ system was trialled, whereby visitors could access information about specific parts of the reserve via a mobile phone. The system proved popular with visitors, and has since been extended to cover all four of the marked trails.

== Other designations ==
The national nature reserve forms part of the Craigellachie Site of Special Scientific Interest (SSSI), which covers a larger area (380 ha). The site lies entirely within the Cairngorms National Park, and is designated a Category IV protected area by the International Union for Conservation of Nature.
