= Lilias Grant =

Lilias Murray, Lady Grant
- Died: 1643 or 1644
- Spouse: John Grant of Freuchie (d. 1622)

Lady Lilias Grant (née Murray d. 1643/4) was a Scottish letter-writer and matriarch of the Grant clan of Freuchie.

== Family background ==
Lady Lilias Murray was the second daughter of Sir John Murray of Tullibardine, Master of the King's Household, who in 1606 was created Earl of Tullibardine, and his wife, Catherine Drummond, daughter of David Lord Drummond. According to the titles of poems by James VI, her sister Anne Murray was the king's mistress.

== Wedding at Tullibardine ==
The marriage contract of Lilias Murray and John Grant Laird of Freuchie was dated at Gask on 15 April 1591. An eighteenth-century author Lachlan Shaw stated that King James the Sixth and his Queen consort, Anne of Denmark, attended the marriage. James attended and performed in a masque with his valet, probably John Wemyss of Logie. They wore Venetian carnival masks and helmets with red and pink taffeta costumes, made by the Edinburgh tailor Alexander Miller. James had taken dancing lessons in 1580. James returned to Edinburgh, and Anne of Denmark went on to Perth alone, where on 29 June she made a ceremonial entry to the town. While the king was at the wedding on 21 and 22 June at Tullibardine Castle, Francis Stewart, 5th Earl of Bothwell escaped from Edinburgh Castle.

In early modern Scotland married women did not usually adopt their husband's surnames. She continued to be called "Lilias Murray" after her marriage. One of her brothers was killed at battle of Glenlivet in 1594.

== Life at Castle Grant ==
Lady Lilias lived at Castle Grant, then called Freuchie castle, or at Ballachastell, near Inverness. From the evidence of the Grant muniments, she seems to have been a lady of much vigour of character. She took an active interest in the affairs of the Grant family, and was greatly respected by her family and neighbours. Taylor the Water-Poet visited Lady Lilias and her husband at Ballachastell in 1618 and was much pleased with her, and he records that she was, both inwardly and outwardly, plentifully endowed with the gifts of grace and nature. He makes no mention of any poetical works.

That Lady Lilias was a reader, and had a collection of books, is proved by two lists of her own library given under her own hand. In one list, St. Augustine, and the "Imitation of Christ" occupy a place.

Two poems survive in the Grant papers, and are attributed to Lilias Murray, although whether original or copies in her own hand is not clear. The two poems, a lyric about a maid overheard complaining of the pangs of love, and a complaint against Cupid mentioning a "mumchance", a masque or guising, are known in other manuscripts.

She bought sugar in Elgin for her household, and when there was a shortage in 1640 due to the Wars of the Three Kingdoms, she wrote, "the succour [sugar] is growin skaircer nor itt wes befoir, for thair is no traffect [traffic] be sea now as wes befoir to Scotland quhilk god send better".

She survived her husband for twenty-one years, dying in the end of 1643 or the beginning of the following year. Her testament and latter will is dated on 30 December 1643. She also survived her son, Sir John Grant, who died in 1637.
