= Anne Gordon, Countess of Moray =

Scottish aristocrat

Anne Gordon, Countess of Moray (1590–1640) was a Scottish aristocrat.

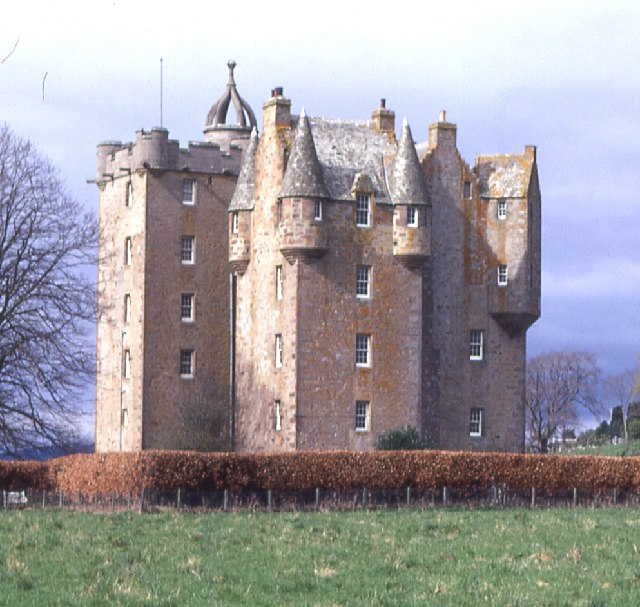
Anne Gordon managed the construction of Castle Stuart

She was a daughter of George Gordon, 1st Marquess of Huntly and Henrietta Stewart.

In 1607 she married James Stuart, 3rd Earl of Moray (died 1638). Her father had been implicated in the murder of his father, James Stewart, 2nd Earl of Moray. The marriage was planned by James VI of Scotland in February 1603 as an act of reconciliation.

As Lady Moray, she lived at Darnaway Castle, and at nearby Castle Stuart (or "Castle Stewart") which she and her husband built. She argued with a neighbouring landowner over rights to lime for the building works in 1618. She also resided at the Moray family lodgings in Elgin and Leith. Anne Gordon was a friend of Margaret Seton, Countess of Seaforth, her neighbour at the Chanonry, and she frequently visited her relations at the Bog o'Gight, now known as Gordon Castle. Some details of her expenditure can be found in the papers of Earls of Moray.

John Taylor the Water Poet visited the Earl and Countess at Darnaway in 1618, enjoying four days of "good cheere in all variety".

She died at Elgin on 19 January 1640.

Her children included:

- James Stuart, 4th Earl of Moray.
- Margaret or Mary Stuart (died 1662), who married on 24 April 1640, James Grant of Freuchie (1616-1663)
- George Stuart
