= Grant of Glenmoriston =

The Grants of Glenmoriston were a Scottish noble family and branch of Clan Grant (senior cadets). Based at Invermoriston, their lands revolved around the River Moriston, near Loch Ness. In Scottish Gaelic they were known as Clann Phàdraig.

== History ==
=== Origins ===
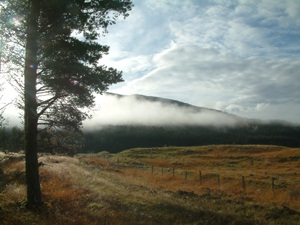
Glenmoriston: the first Grant laird received a charter for the barony of Glenmoriston in 1509

The Grants of Glenmoriston, also known as the Grants of Invermoriston, bear an illustrious history; indeed as Isabel Frances Grant states: "the Grants of Glenmoriston have constantly been alluded to in the general history of the Clan". Tradition holds that the Clan Grant was of royal Nordic or Gaelic extraction, though in reality most likely descended from Anglo-Normans. The Grant motto is 'Stand fast'.

This branch of Clan Grant descends from John Mor Grant, 1st of Glenmoriston (died 1548), the illegitimate son of John Grant, 2nd of Freuchie, Chief of Clan Grant (died 1528). He married Agnes Fraser, daughter of Lord Lovat, and was the father of Patrick Grant, 2nd of Glenmoriston, who may be considered the more actual progenitor of the Grants of Glenmoriston. It is from him that the Glenmoriston chieftains derive their distinctive patronymic Mac Phadruick.

=== Jacobite era ===
Unlike their kinsmen in Strathspey, the Grants of Glenmoriston were strong supporters of the Jacobite cause and fought in every major Jacobite uprising.

John Grant, 6th of Glenmoriston (who married a daughter of Sir Ewen Cameron of Lochiel – a union which formed close ties between the families) was a committed Jacobite and fought at the Battle of Killiecrankie in 1689. The Grants of Glenmoriston also fought on the Jacobite side during the 1715 Rising and 1719 Rising, and the laird was attainted for his part. During the 1745 Rising, Patrick Grant, 8th of Glenmoriston raised over 100 hundred men for Prince Charles Edward Stuart and led his men during the campaign, notably at the Battle of Prestonpans in September 1745. Following the decisive Battle of Culloden in April 1746, it is believed that 80 Grants of Glenmoriston were captured and enslaved in Barbados. The "Seven men of Glenmoriston", led by one Peter Dubh Grant, became notorious outlaws in the aftermath of Culloden.

The Grants suffered severe reprisal in the aftermath of the rising. Glenmoriston was pillaged and their seat Invermoriston House was burned down. Patrick Grant of Glenmoriston was only pardoned, and had his lands returned, by the good grace of his prominent relative, Sir Ludovick Grant of Grant, Chief of Clan Grant, who put in a good word with Lord President Forbes.

=== Later history ===
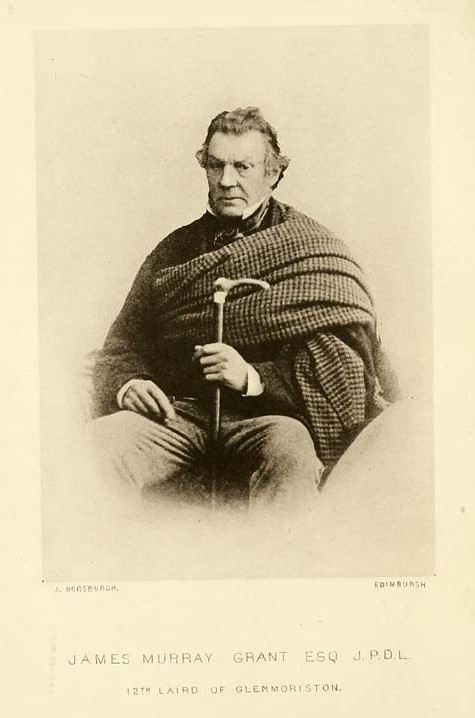
James Grant, 12th Laird of Glenmoriston was succeeded by his grandson, the 13th Laird, who was the last chieftain of the Grants of Glenmoriston.

Lt. Col. John Grant, 10th of Glenmoriston was an officer in the 42nd Highlanders and saw distinguished service in India. His elder son died in his youth and so he was succeeded by his second son, James Murray Grant, who was a prominent landowner and perhaps the last of the great Glenmoriston chieftains.

== Lairds of Glenmoriston ==
- John Mor Grant, 1st of Glenmoriston (died 1548)
- Patrick Grant, 2nd of Glenmoriston (died 1581)
- John Grant, 3rd of Glenmoriston (1576–1637)
- Patrick Og Grant, 4th of Glenmoriston (1598–1643)
- John Doun Grant, 5th of Glenmoriston (1635–1703)
- John Grant, 6th of Glenmoriston (1657–1736)
- John Grant, 7th of Glenmoriston (died 1734)
- Patrick Grant, 8th of Glenmoriston (1700–1786)
- Patrick Grant, 9th of Glenmoriston (1732–1793)
- Lt.-Col. John Grant, 10th of Glenmoriston (1762–1801)
- Patrick Grant, 11th of Glenmoriston (1790–1808)
- James Murray Grant, 12th of Glenmoriston (1792–1868)
- Iain Robert James Murray Grant, 13th of Glenmoriston (1860–1953)

== Notable descendants ==
- Alexander Grant (1734-1813), Administrator of Upper Canada and Royal Navy officer
- Heathcoat Salusbury Grant (1864–1938), Royal Navy officer
- Hugh Grant (born 1960), English actor
- The Barons Walsingham

== See also ==
- Clan Grant
- Siol Alpin
- Baron Strathspey
