= John Grant of Freuchie (d. 1622) =

Scottish landowner (c. 1568–1622)

John Grant of Freuchie (c. 1568 – 1622) was a Scottish landowner.

John was the fifth laird of Freuchie, now called Castle Grant, a mile north of Grantown-on-Spey. His other property was Ballachastell, near Inverness.

He was the eldest son of Duncan Grant (died 1582) and Margaret Mackintosh. John Grant became head of the family when his grandfather, also John Grant, died in 1585.

== Feud ==
Freuchie joined in a feud between the Earl of Huntly and the Earl of Moray, over the marriage of John Gordon, son of the laird of Cluny, to the widow of the Grant of Ballindalloch. One of Gordon's servants was killed by John Grant, former Tutor of Ballindaloch, the administrator of the estate. The Earl of Huntly went to Ballindalloch in November 1590 to arrest the Tutor. John Grant of Freuchie promised to deliver the Tutor and his accomplices, accused of murder and other crimes, to Huntly Castle. However, Freuchie joined with the Tutor's men and the Earl of Moray, and came to Forres and Darnaway Castle, and there shot pistols at Huntly's officers and cannon from the castle, and killed John Gordon of Birsmoir, brother of the Laird of Cluny.

Freuchie was pursued in law by the Earl of Huntly for the killing of John Gordon of Birsmoir, as treason, but the Privy Council suspended the matter. Freuchie then claimed Huntly was "stirred up" against him and caused "trouble and unquietness" in the north of Scotland.

== Wedding masque at Tullibardine ==
He married Lilias Murray, a daughter of Sir John Murray of Tullibardine in 1591. The marriage contract was signed on the 15 April, and James VI of Scotland and probably his wife Anne of Denmark rode from Linlithgow Palace to attend the wedding itself at Tullibardine on 21 June 1591. At the wedding King James and his valet John Wemyss of Logie performed a masque in costume. The outfits were made by the Edinburgh tailor Alexander Miller. Anne of Denmark went on to Perth where she made a ceremonial entry to the town a few days later.

== Later career ==
Grant of Freuchie was a powerful landlord with a large following. In February 1596 he made a muster of his whole kin, friends, and servants, able to fight for King James and the Sheriff of Moray, totalling 500 men. 300 were armed and able to go to war, of these 40 had habergeons, two handled swords, and helmets, another 40 had bows, helmets, swords, and targes, "according to the Highland custom".

In December 1601 Alexander Falconer of Halkerton wrote to Grant saying he had not yet found him a greyhound, the plague was evil in Edinburgh, and the official narrative of the Gowrie House conspiracy was just printed.

In 1608 he plotted with his brother-in-law William, Master of Tullibardine and Mr James Stewart, Commissary of Dunkeld, to help the Earl of Atholl escape from Edinburgh Castle.

In March 1613 James VI and I ordered him to pursue Allester MacAllester Vreik and Duncan McVcEandowy of the Clan Gregor and their followers. In August 1613 Grant found Allester McAllester in his territory, and captured him, and on the same day his men tried to take Duncan McVcEandowy, but he escaped.

In 1617 John Grant of Freuchie was asked to provide capercailzies and ptarmigan, for the royal visit. In 1618 John Taylor, the London Water Poet, visited the Grants at Ballachastell on his pilgrimage in Scotland. They entertained him lavishly for four days with other house guests including four earls, a lord, and several knights and their retainers.

Grant was sometimes an ally of the Earl of Huntly; in 1592 he was a cautioner for one of the earl's debts, and his wife, Henrietta Stewart, Marchioness of Huntly wrote to him about a business bond in 1610.

John Grant died on 20 September 1622. His son John became the sixth laird of Freuchie.

== Family ==
John Grant and Lilias Murray had the following children:

- John Grant, later Laird of Freuchie (1596–1637), who married Mary Ogilvie of Deskford. Their children included James Grant (1616–1663), later Laird of Freuchie.
- Annas or Agnes Grant (c. 1594 – c. 1622), she married (1) Lachlan Mackintosh of Dunachton in 1611, (2) William Mackintosh.
- Jean or Janet Grant (born 1597), married William Sutherland, 10th of Duffus and later Thomas Mackenzie of Pluscarden.
- Lilias Grant (born 1599), married Sir William Innes of Balveny.
- Katherine Grant (born 1604), married Alexander Ogilvie of Kempcairn.
