= Francis Stuart (sailor) =

Sir Francis Stuart (1589 – 1635) was a Scottish sailor, aristocrat, member of Parliament and courtier. King James I wrote his name as "Frank Stewart".

== Early years ==
He was born at Donibristle in Fife, Scotland, the son of James Stewart, 2nd Earl of Moray and Elizabeth Stuart, 2nd Countess of Moray. Francis Stuart was educated at Christ Church, Oxford with an annuity of £200 from King James.

== Anne Gunter ==
At Oxford he was involved in the investigation of Anne Gunter's accusations of witchcraft against Elizabeth Gregory. He gave evidence in February 1606 in the Star Chamber of witnessing Anne loosen her clothing for dramatic effect. Stuart was asked if Gunter's breath smelled unusual, and he answered that "he did always observe in her fits that her breath had a very strange smell, as if she had taken compound drinks."

In 1603 his sister Margaret married the Admiral Charles Howard, Earl of Nottingham. Francis was knighted in 1610, at the creation of Prince Henry as Prince of Wales. He joined the navy. In 1614 William Cavendish recommended his full naturalization in Parliament.

In October 1615 he was involved in an affair which displeased the king. Sir Thomas Howard, Master of Prince Henry's Horse, sent him a letter bordering on sedition, which was delivered by Stuart and William Ramsay, a servant of the king's bedchamber, to Viscount Haddington.

At the funeral of Anne of Denmark in May 1619 Stuart carried the banner of the Goths.

== Spanish Match ==
He was sent to Spain in May 1623 during the Spanish Match to carry the patent to make George Villiers Duke of Buckingham and Earl of Coventry. Stuart received £200 for this voyage. He sailed in the St George and the Antelope. Stewart made an account of his expenses in this voyage.

He brought a parcel of jewels for Prince Charles, many of which had belonged to Anne of Denmark. These included; the jewelled sword given to Prince Henry during the masque Tethys' Festival; the "Portugal diamond"; the "Cobham pearl"; jewelled head attires; and a ring with a diamond frog and a ruby set in its head. King James had second thoughts about sending this jewellery. He wrote to Buckingham that Stuart was bringing a box of jewels including a pearl necklace that he had given to "poor fool Kaite". Four head dresses brought by "Franke Stewarte" would be too precious and were "not fit for a subject", and they should give one to the Queen of Spain, or bring all of these pieces "hoame again". The "Portugal diamond" was returned to England.

== Court and the Navy ==
Stuart was present at the private burial of King James at midnight on 5 May 1625 with the Earl of Kellie and Robert Gordon of Gordonstoun.

In July 1625 he sailed to the Mediterranean with the Lion and Rainbow to combat Turkish pirates. On 2 July 1625 he wrote to Sir John Coke to address the problem of deserters. It was a risk to send men ashore for fresh water. Sir James Bagg of Saltram House, an admiralty official at Plymouth resented his apparent influence at court, and said he was a "demi-god" aboard the Lion.

In April 1626 Charles I discharged Francis from court. The Earl of Pembroke was asked to give him the news but spoke in his favour to the king, saying that King James had loved him as well as any in the court of England. An incident in July 1627 near the Azores where Francis avoided a Spanish fleet in conditions of poor visibility was widely reported. That same year (and undoubtedly part of the same voyage) Stewart commanded the ship Hector as part of the Earl of Warwick's privateering mission to the Spanish West Indies.

There is evidence of his interest in science. According to John Aubrey, Sir Robert Moray presented observations on comets to the Royal Society made by Thomas Harriot, which he had heard from Sir Francis.

John Cleland dedicated a section of his conduct book Ero-paideia (1607) to Francis and John Stuart, a son of the Duke of Lennox.

Ben Jonson dedicated the 1619 edition of the play Epicœne, or The silent woman to Francis, who had defended the play from charges of libel brought by Arbella Stuart in 1610. It had been suggested that a reference to a Prince of Moldavia in the play reflected on her plans for marriage to an imposter.

Francis Stuart died unmarried in Chelsea in 1635. His house was leased from his sister, the Countess of Nottingham. He had borrowed £600 from Agrippina Gilborne, the wife of Sir Richard Bingley (d. 1626), Surveyor of the King's Ships.

According to his will, he had a daughter, Frances, with Mrs Cecily Reyman. Cecily Reyman was perhaps a daughter of Devenish Rayman or Ryman of Apuldram and his wife Anne Cox, who was the daughter of John Cox, a steward to the Earl of Nottingham. Cecily Ryman later married Bryan Bickley of Chidham, Sussex.
