= Elizabeth Stuart, 2nd Countess of Moray =

Scottish countess

Elizabeth Stuart, 2nd Countess of Moray suo jure (1565 – 18 November 1591), was a Scottish noblewoman and cousin of King James VI.

== Life ==
The Countess of Moray was the eldest daughter of James Stewart, 1st Earl of Moray, the illegitimate son of King James V and Regent of Scotland, and Lady Agnes Keith. She was born at St Andrews while her father was in exile in England following the Chaseabout Raid, a rebellion against Mary, Queen of Scots. After her father was assassinated, her mother married Colin Campbell, 6th Earl of Argyll.

On 23 January 1581 she married James Stewart, son of James Stewart, 1st Lord Doune. The match may have been intended to build stronger relations between the Earl of Argyll and Doune.

The wedding was celebrated on 31 January in Fife with a tournament of "running at the ring". James VI of Scotland took part. The King's masque costume was made of white satin dressed with silken ribbons. Two days later, the party came to Leith, where a water pageant culminated in an assault on a pasteboard Papal Castel Sant'Angelo, built on boats on the Water of Leith. Some of her father's friends and relatives thought that Lord Doune's son was not of sufficient status to marry her.

She died in childbirth in November 1591.

== Family ==
Her children included:

- Grizel Stewart, who married Robert Innes, 1st Baronet Innes (died 1655)
- Margaret Stewart (1591 – 4 August 1639), who married
  - first (as his second wife), Charles Howard, 1st Earl of Nottingham; and
  - second, William Monson, Viscount Monson
- James Stewart, 3rd Earl of Moray (before 1591 – 6 August 1638), who married Lady Anne Gordon (died 1640). Their children included James Stewart, 4th Earl of Moray
- Elizabeth Stewart, married John Abernethy, 8th Lord Abernethy of Saltoun, son of Alexander Abernethy, 6th Lord Saltoun
- Francis Stewart, Knight of the Order of the Bath, who was involved in the Anne Gunter witchcraft case.

== Material culture ==
An inventory of a selection of the best of the goods belonging to Elizabeth Stuart made after her death includes some of her jewellery and clothing, and the furnishings of Darnaway Castle. Her jewels included; a pair of "garnishings" of gold with red enamel (worn as a headdress), weighing five ounces and valued at £200 Scots; a gold necklace enamelled black and white; a gold chain; three dozen pairs of gold horns (a kind of aglet or aiguillette) enamelled white; a "hinger" or bodkin for her hair set with a diamond and seven emeralds, worth £100 Scots; bracelets, enamelled black and white; a "carcat" (a collar) set with emeralds and pearls; and a "tablet" (locket) set with five diamonds and five emeralds with a chain of gold.

Garnishings for a headdress, known as biliments in England, were sometimes given as wedding presents by James VI. The countess's clothes included; a night gown of black velvet with gold passementerie, worth £400 Scots; a skirt and doublet of cloth of gold figured on blue velvet, worth £400 Scots; a "wastryn" or vasquine skirt of cloth of gold valued at £600 Scots; and a cloak of grosgrain taffeta furred with grey rabbit skins worth £100. The cloak was described in the Scots language as "her best clok of growgrain taffetie furrit with gray cunningis". Possibly, some these clothes had belonged to her mother Agnes or Annas Keith, an inventory of Darnaway made in 1575 included a coffer containing her seven long-tailed gowns.

The Earl's best bed had valances of red velvet and cloth of gold, and curtains of red Spanish taffeta trimmed with gold, valued at £1000 Scots. A turned wooden mazer bound with silver was valued at £20 Scots. There was tapestry in his bedchamber and in the great and little hall. Darnaway Castle was equipped with spears, halberds, muskets, and an iron rod with ten shackles for prisoners. These goods had been taken from Darnaway by the Earl of Atholl, an ally of her husband.

Peerage of Scotland
Preceded by James Stewart	Countess of Moray; 1570–1591	Succeeded by James Stewart
