= Castle Stuart =

Castle in Highland, Scotland

- Petty, Inverness, Scotland
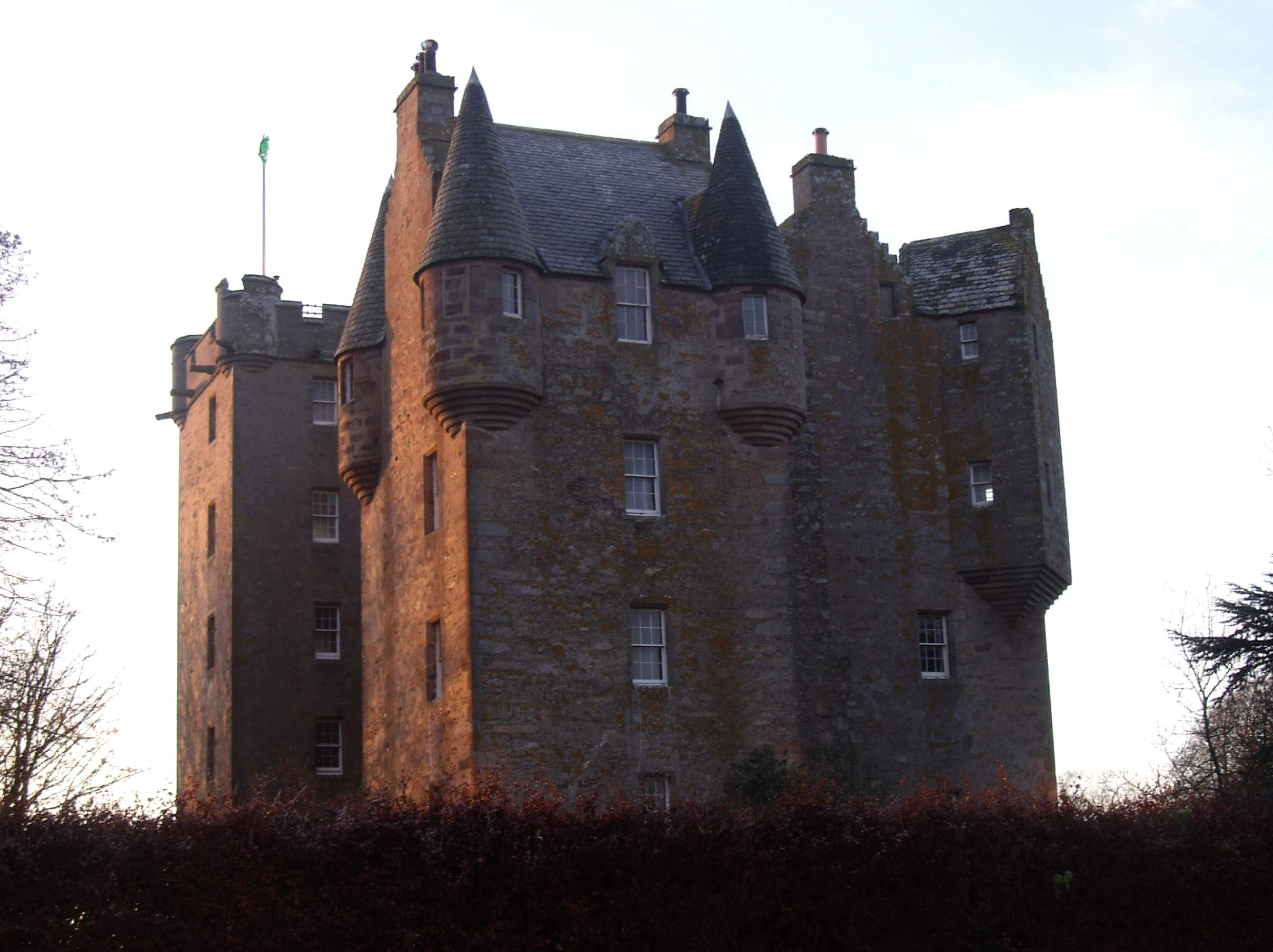
- Castle Stuart in 2009

Site information
- Type: Tower house
- Owner: Private
- Condition: Restored

Location
- Location within Highland
- Coordinates: 57.528°N 4.106°W
- Grid reference: grid reference NH744494

Site history
- Built: between 1619 and 1625
- Built by: The 3rd Earl of Moray
- In use: 17th century; 20th and 21st centuries

Castle Stuart is a restored tower house on the banks of the Moray Firth, about 6.5 miles (10 km) northeast of Inverness.

The land the castle was built on was granted to the 1st Earl of Moray by his half-sister, Mary, Queen of Scots, following her return to Scotland in 1561. The successive murders of Lord Moray and his son-in-law, the 2nd Earl of Moray, meant that the castle was finally completed by his grandson, the 3rd Earl of Moray, in 1625.

Though the castle initially flourished, it fell into disuse as the fortunes of the House of Stuart sank during the English Civil War and King Charles I's execution in 1649. The castle lay derelict for 300 years before being restored; it is currently used as a luxury hotel.

== Golf Links ==
The seaside links golf course at Castle Stuart along Moray Firth opened in 2009, co-designed by managing partner Mark Parsinen and architect Gil Hanse. It was voted as the Best New Golf Course by Golf magazine.

The course hosted the Scottish Open in 2011, 2012, 2013, and 2016.

=== Scorecard ===
Castle Stuart Golf Links
Tee	Rating/Slope	1	2	3	4	5	6	7	8	9	Out	10	11	12	13	14	15	16	17	18	In	Total
Par		4	5	4	3	4	5	4	3	4	36	4	3	5	4	4	4	4	3	5	36	72
Black		464	550	305	191	447	560	461	218	364	3530	405	144	528	441	386	421	335	224	595	3479	7009
White		360	530	290	176	430	522	451	208	350	3317	360	130	518	416	360	409	325	210	508	3236	6553
Green		330	486	266	161	401	505	429	192	330	3100	341	115	504	363	347	388	310	195	490	3053	6153
Blue		330	486	266	161	332	411	359	192	330	2867	341	115	504	303	347	314	310	133	490	2857	5724
Red		299	400	236	151	332	411	359	166	226	2580	315	91	414	303	318	314	260	133	420	2568	5148
SI	Men's	9	5	13	17	7	3	1	15	11		14	16	2	4	10	8	18	6	12
