= John Scougal =

Scottish painter (1645–1730)

John Scougal (1645–1730) was a Scottish painter.

== Life ==
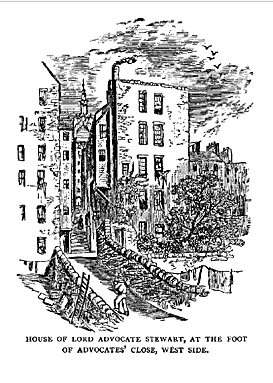
The house of John Scougal (left) at the foot of Advocates Close

He was a cousin to Patrick Scougal (died 1682), Bishop of Aberdeen and to Patrick's brother John Scougal, Lord Whitekirk. John Scougal is said to have been born at Leith, where his father David had a residence, and where several of his works were still in the Town Hall in the nineteenth century.

In the latter part of the seventeenth century, one of the resorts of the fashion and beauty in Edinburgh was on the east side of the Advocates' Close, where John Scougal the painter rented or owned a house, to which he had added an upper story arranged as a studio. It stood opposite the house of Sir James Stewart.

Scougal had a very extensive practice, which latterly led him into some hasty work, said to be observable in the portrait of George Heriot, which he copied in 1698 from the now lost original by Paul van Somer. The portrait hangs in the council room of George Heriot's School.

In the City of Glasgow collection are three full-lengths of William III, Queen Mary, and Queen Anne. Of these, Queen Mary is by far the best – well drawn, good in colour, and suggestive of the influence of Van Dyke's work. From the Glasgow Town Council Minutes of 12 March 1708, it is ascertained that the purchase by the Provost of the William and Mary from "Mr Scougal, limner (painter) in Edinburgh," for £27 sterling, was approved. Payment for the Queen Anne was ordered to be made on 2 August 1712, to "John Scougal, elder, painter, fifteen pounds sterling."

The Glasgow Council entries indicate he had a son of the same name; Andrew Bell, the engraver, who had several of Scougal's works in his possession, married his granddaughter.

John Scougal died at Prestonpans in 1730, in his eighty-fifth year.

== Works ==
- Elizabeth Lauder, wife of Charles Maitland, 3rd Earl of Lauderdale (1669) (now in Thirlestane Castle)
- Richard Lauder, Laird of Haltoun, Chief of the Lauders (1669) (in Thirlestane Castle)
- Archibald Primrose, Lord Carrington, Lord Justice Clerk (1670) (in the collection of Lord Rosebery)
- Sir Thomas Steuart of Kirkfield and Coltness, Bart, MP, (1631–1698) c.1685 (University of Edinburgh Art Collection)
- John Leslie, 8th Earl of Rothes (two separate portraits in the Clan Leslie Charitable Trust)
- George Heriot (1698)
- Two paintings of ancestors of the Clerks of Penicuik
- Isabel, daughter of Charles Maitland, 3rd Earl of Lauderdale (1706) (family collection)
- King William III (1707–08) (in the Glasgow collection)
- Queen Mary (1707–08) (in the Glasgow collection)
- Queen Anne (1712) (in the Glasgow collection)
