= Mumchance =

Dice game

Mumchance or momchaunce was a 16th-century dice or card game involving betting.

The game involved silence or bluff (the first syllable, "mum", is related to the phrase "keep mum"). A version played with cards was sometimes identified as "mumchance-at-cards". The word can also mean mummery.

Mumchance was played at the court of Henry VIII of England. In October 1518 Henry VIII and Cardinal Wolsey played mumchance with French diplomats at Westminster Palace after a banquet and a masque. In January 1527, Henry VIII came to the hall at Hampton Court, in a company disguised as French noblemen in costumes of satin and gold resembling shepherd's clothing, requesting a game of mumchance with the "excellent fair dames". According to George Cavendish, Wolsey's guests cast or threw dice to win gold crown coins. James VI of Scotland played mumchance in 1590 during his trip to Denmark.

Allusions to the game, usually referring to exposure to foolish risk, appear in plays and correspondence. Francis Beaumont of Bedworth wrote to Anne Newdigate, that he "having before more unadvisedlie than wiselie haszarded so worthy a Ladies favoure upon a mum chaunce, my diseased soule ... could finde no rest". A poem attributed to Lilias Murray, Lady Grant includes a complaint against Cupid and mentions a "mumchance".
