= Heathcoat Salusbury Grant =

Royal Navy Admiral (1864–1938)

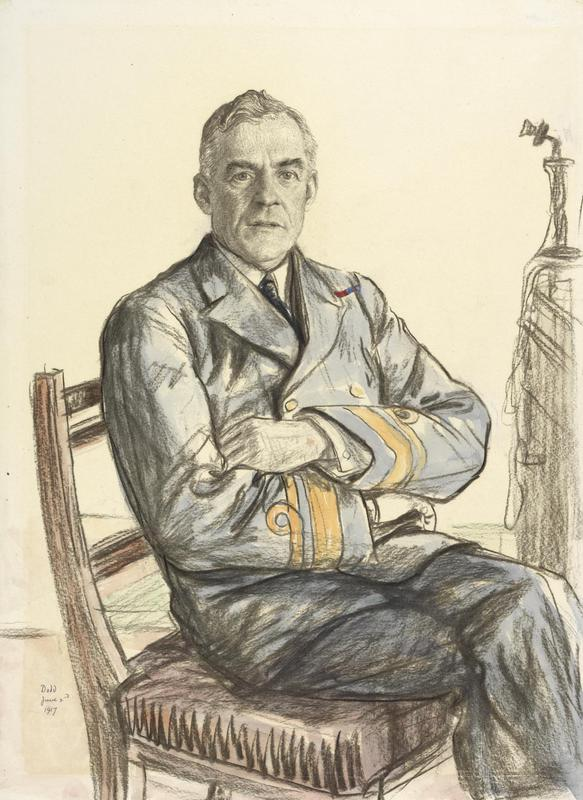

Admiral Sir Heathcoat Salusbury Grant KCMG CB (13 February 1864 – 25 September 1938) was a Royal Navy officer who served during the First World War, most notably as the captain of HMS Canopus.

== Biography ==
=== Early life and career ===
Heathcoat Grant was born on 13 February 1864, the son of Capt. John Grant, and a scion of the Grants of Glenmoriston. He entered HMS Britannia as a cadet in July 1877, placing thirty-seventh out forty-six successful candidates. He was promoted to lieutenant in 1887, commander in 1899, and captain in 1904. He was naval attaché in Washington, D.C. from 1912 to 1914.

=== First World War ===
At the outbreak of the First World War, Grant was appointed in command of the pre-dreadnought battleship HMS Canopus, which was sent to the Falkland Islands to reinforce Rear Admiral Christopher Cradock's squadron. Cradock had initially intended to take Canopus with his squadron, but left her behind due to her slow speed and need for overhaul; an order from the First Sea Lord that Cradock should not risk engaging Maximilian von Spee's squadron without Canopus arrived after Cradock had already sailed.

After Cradock's squadron was destroyed at the Battle of Coronel by von Spee, Canopus was assigned to defend Stanley Harbour, and fired the first shots at the Battle of the Falkland Islands, when von Spee's squadron was destroyed.

In 1915, Canopus took part in the Dardanelles Campaign, for which Grant was appointed a CB.

Grant remained in the Canopus until 1916

=== Retirement and later life ===
Grant was promoted to vice-admiral on 25 March 1920 and was retired the following day. In 1923, he published his recollections of his time in command of Canopus in The Naval Review. He was promoted to admiral on the retired list on 8 May 1925.
