= James Grant, 12th of Glenmoriston =

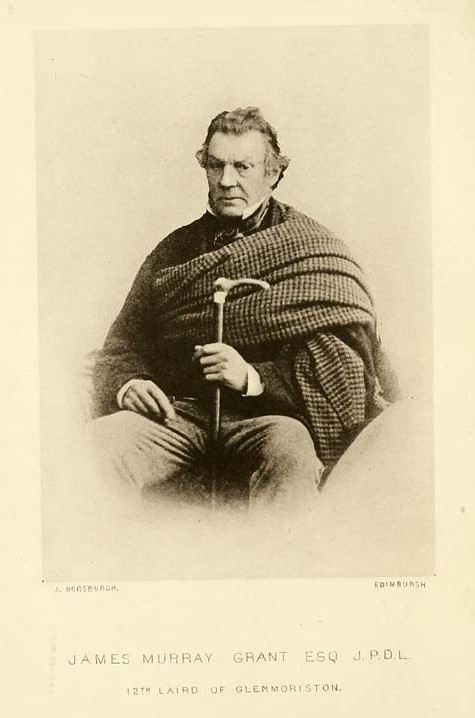
James Murray Grant of Glenmoriston, by John Horsburgh

James Murray Grant, 12th of Glenmoriston, JP, DL (1792–1868) was a Scottish Highland chieftain and laird of Glenmoriston. The son of Lt.-Col. John Grant, 10th of Glenmoriston (1762–1801) and Elizabeth Townsend Grant (1765–1814), he succeeded his brother Patrick as chieftain of the Grants of Glenmoriston in 1808.

Grant married his cousin Henrietta Cameron (1788–1871), daughter of Ewen Cameron, 13th of Glen Nevis and Helen Grant (daughter of the 9th laird of Glenmoriston), on 5 October 1813. They had four children.

He held the office of Deputy lieutenant for Inverness-shire, and was also a Justice of the peace. He inherited the Moy estate on the death of his cousin, Hugh Grant of Moy. He died on 8 August 1868 at Urquhart, Inverness-shire, Scotland. He was succeeded by his grandson, Iain Robert James Murray Grant, 13th of Glenmoriston (1860–1953).

== See also ==
- Grant of Glenmoriston
