= James Stewart, 1st Lord Doune =

Scottish landowner

James Stewart, 1st Lord Doune (1529–1590) was a Scottish landowner.

== Career ==
James Stewart was the son of Sir James Stewart of Beith (d. 1547), Constable of Doune Castle, who was the third son of Andrew Stewart, 1st Lord Avondale, and Margaret Lindsay, who was a daughter of John Lindsay, 3rd Lord Lindsay of the Byres, widow of Richard Stewart, Lord Innermeath. His sister Margaret Stewart was a maid of honour in the household of Mary of Guise and married James Ogilvie of Balfour in 1554.

His father was killed at Dunblane in 1547 by Edmondstone of Duntreath and his followers, in a quarrel over the office of Steward of Menteith. Mary of Guise wrote from Stirling Castle to his mother Lady Innermeath, counselling patience and offering support.

Stewart was Constable of Doune Castle, and Commendator of Inchcolm Abbey. He was often called "St Colme" in contemporary letters. When Lord Darnley was made Lord of Ardmanoch and Earl of Ross at Stirling Castle on 15 May 1565, Stewart was one of 15 men who were made knights. He was created Lord Doune on 24 November 1581.

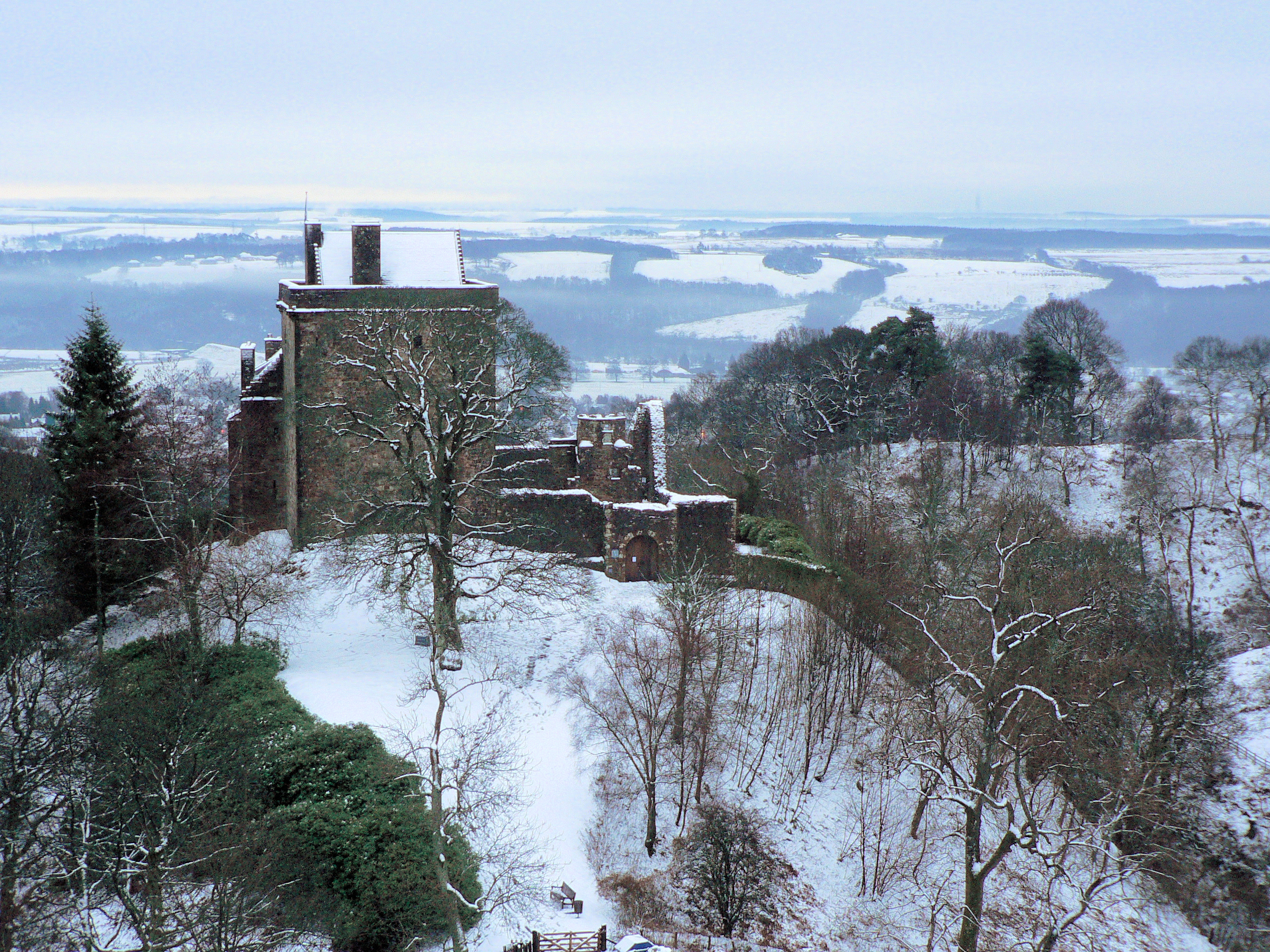
Wedding celebrations at Castle Campbell on 10 January 1563 included a Masque of Shepherds.

In 1560 he was one of Lords of the Articles at the Scottish Reformation Parliament. In August 1561 he was in France, and wrote to Lord James, the queen's half-brother, that Mary, Queen of Scots was determined to come back to Scotland. She told him to make it known she would not take offers from Scottish lords for their loyalty. He brought Mary's letters to Queen Elizabeth at Heveningham in Suffolk on 16 August, where he gave her excuses for not ratifying the Treaty of Edinburgh and confirmed that Mary was returning to Scotland. He returned to Scotland 4 days after Mary's arrival with her safe-conduct document from Elizabeth.

In November 1561, Stewart was sent to France, and travelled down the Great North Road to London in six days. While he was in London he took ferry boats over the Thames several times, costing 6 shillings and 4 pence. He then went to Dover to get a boat for France. On his return to England in January 1562, Elizabeth gave him a letter for Mary Queen of Scots, in which she apologised for not sending her portrait because the artist was unwell. Mary, Queen of Scots mentioned to the ambassador Thomas Randolph that she would send Elizabeth a ring with a diamond made like a heart by the envoy who brought the portrait. Stewart was sent to England again in May 1562 in connection with plans for the interview of the two queens.

== Wedding and masque at Castle Campbell ==
He married Margaret Campbell (d. 1592), sister of Archibald Campbell, 5th Earl of Argyll at Castle Campbell on 10 January 1563. There was a masque involving courtiers and musicians playing lutes dressed in white taffeta as shepherds. However, both Mary, Queen of Scots and her half brother James Stewart, 1st Earl of Moray became ill during their stay at Castle Campbell.

The costumes for the wedding masque used fabrics from the royal wardrobe, some recycled from other garments. The record is in French:

Plus, une aulne et demie de damas blanc pour faire six gibesieres de bergers pour des masques au nopces de Monsieur de Sainct Colme
Plus, j'ay delivre a Jacques le tailleur deux manteaux de masque faictz de taffeta blanc pour faire d'aultre sorte d'habillmentz a ceux qui jouoient du lut pour lesdicts masques
Il a este rompu trois habillementz de taffetas blanc borde de rouge lesquelz servirent a abiller des jouers aux nopces de Monsieur de Sainct Colme.

More, for an ell and a half of white damask to make six satchels for shepherds for the masques at the wedding of the Master of Inchcolm
More, I delivered to Jacques the tailor two masque cloaks of white taffeta to make another sort of costume for the lute players for the said masques.
Three white taffeta costumes with red borders were broken up which served to dress players at the wedding of the Master of Inchcolm.

== Building the Queen's Hunt Hall ==
In August 1563, James Stewart built a new Hunt Hall for Mary, Queen of Scots at Glen Artney in Perthshire, near Comrie, following directions from the Comptroller of Scotland, John Wishart of Pitarrow. He spent 200 merks on the project, but did not receive £32 in complete payment until 1580. A ruined building near Dalclathick Farm may represent the site, although it seems rather small.

== Later life ==
His sister Elizabeth married Robert Crichton of Cluny. In 1568 Mary Queen of Scots wrote to St Colme from Bolton Castle asking him to write more often, in cipher, and send Crichton to her. His brother Archibald Stewart married Helen Acheson, whose family owned Acheson's Haven near Prestongrange.

In January 1581 his eldest son James Stewart married Elizabeth Stuart, 2nd Countess of Moray, who was the elder daughter and successor of Regent Moray. The wedding was celebrated on 31 January in Fife with a tournament of "running at the ring" and James VI of Scotland took part. the King's masque costume was of white satin with silken ribbons. Two days after the party came to Leith, where a water pageant culminated with a theatrical assault on a Papal Castel Sant'Angelo, built on boats on the water of Leith. Some of her relatives and father's friends thought the Lord Doune's son was not of sufficient status to marry her.

In June 1581 James VI rewarded Sir James Stewart of Doune for his expenses keeping the former Regent Morton a prisoner, with the unpaid rents and duties of the lands of Aberdour.

In April 1583 the English diplomat Robert Bowes thought James VI had employed Lord Doune to hasten his departure from Scotland. Lord Doune was trying to get the Jesuit William Holt released from Edinburgh Castle so he could go to France. In May 1583 Esmé Stewart, Duke of Lennox wrote to him from Paris, asking him to take care of his son Ludovic and help him recover his former possessions in Scotland for his benefit.

When Sir James Balfour appeared to forgiven for any involvement in the murder of Lord Darnley in February 1584, Doune protested and said to James VI, "God forbid that the King shall so little regard his father's murder." James VI answered that Doune had forgiven his father's murder.

In 1587 he seized the houses of Carnock and Bannockburn, and a townhouse in Stirling belonging to Robert Drummond of Carnock, which were forfeit due to a failed property transaction.

He died in 1590.

It was said that his widow, Margaret Campbell, Lady Doune, died in April 1592, from grief at not being allowed to bury her son, the murdered Earl of Moray, in Edinburgh. She left a note requesting the king take action against his murderers.

== Family ==
The children of James Stewart and Margaret Campbell included:

- James Stewart, 2nd Earl of Moray (d. 1592), he married Elizabeth Stuart, 2nd Countess of Moray, and became the subject of a popular ballad, The Bonnie Earl of Moray.
- Henry or Harry Stewart, later Lord St Colm, and Tutor of James Stewart, 3rd Earl of Moray.
- Archibald Stewart
- John Stewart, (d. Dec 1609)
- Alexander Stewart
- Mary Stewart, married Sir John Wemyss of Wemyss (d. 1622) in 1581. Their eldest son was John Wemyss, 1st Earl of Wemyss.
- Margaret Stewart, who was betrothed to John Stewart, Master of Orkney, but died c. 1599.
- Jean Stewart (d. 1 Jul 1622), a lady in waiting to Anne of Denmark who married in 1596 Simon Fraser, 6th Lord Lovat. He was the son of Hugh Fraser, 5th Lord Lovat and Elizabeth Stewart, later Countess of Arran.
