= David Scougall =

Scottish portrait painter (c.1610–c.1680)

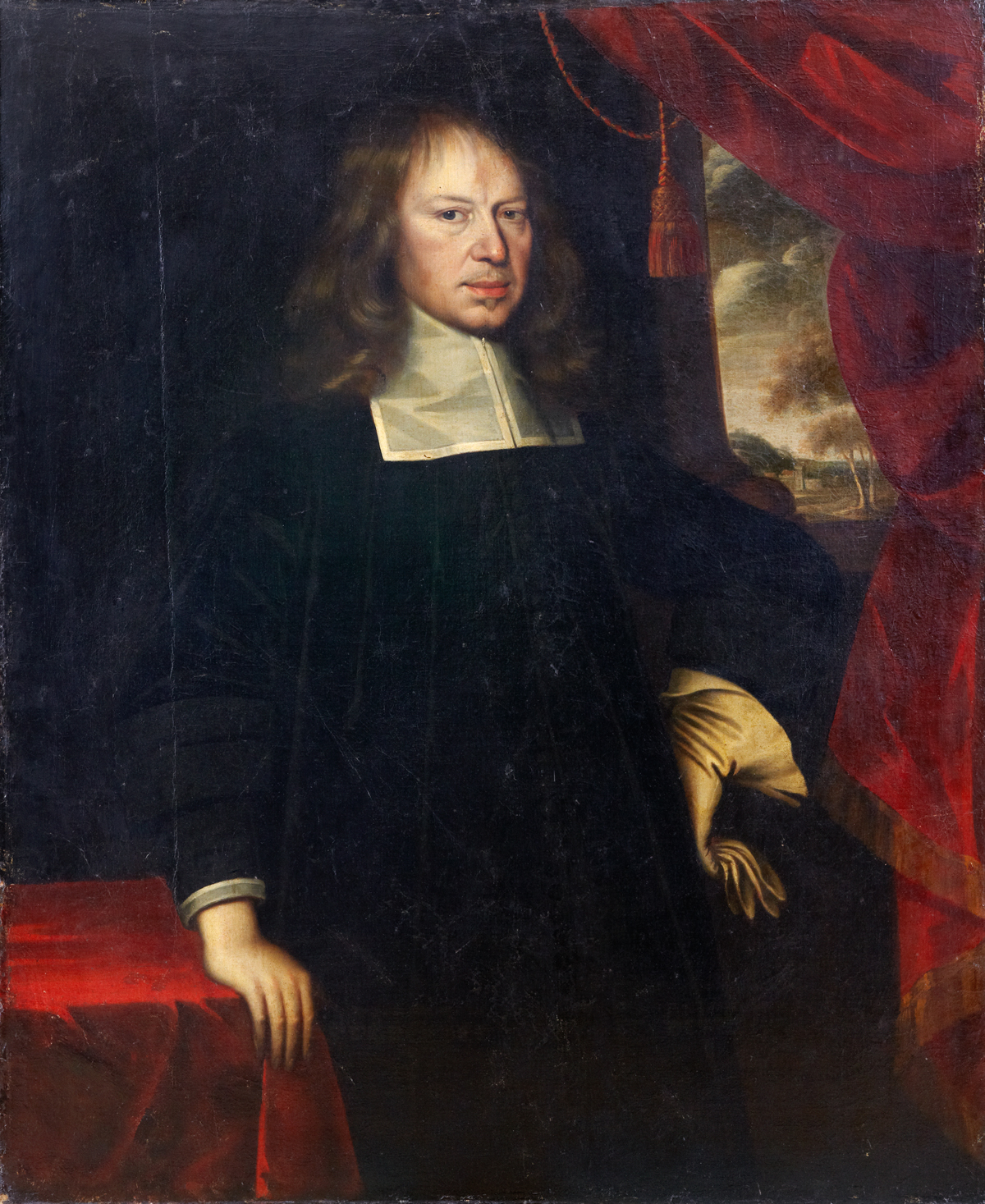
James Steuart of Coltness, attributed to David Scougall

David Scougall or Scougal (c.1610–c.1680) was a Scottish portrait painter.

He is the earliest clearly recorded member of a family of artists, including his son John and grandson George (the latter two often referred to as the "elder" and "younger" Scougall). Other relatives included Patrick Scougal, Bishop of Aberdeen.

== Life ==
Scougall was known to have resided at Leith. Although it has been supposed that there was an earlier portraitist in the family, a John Scougall roughly contemporary with Daniël Mijtens, David is the first for whom concrete records exist, with payments to him recorded in 1672 and portraits signed by him dating from the 1650s, including the Laird of Grant and Lady Mary held by the National Museums of Scotland.

Scougall's style follows in the path of Scotland's first great painter George Jamesone, but was historically said to bear "a great resemblance to that of Sir Peter Lely" and similarly to much of Lely's output, his attributed work consists of formal portraits of the gentry of the time. During the period immediately after the Restoration of Charles II, Scougall dominated the Scottish portrait market, producing many portraits of members of the new Parliament. Amongst better known works attributed to him are portraits of the Marquess of Argyll and of Robert Campbell of Glenlyon.
