= James Stuart, 3rd Earl of Moray =

Scottish noble (1581–1638)

Arms of the Earl of Moray

James Stuart, 3rd Earl of Moray (1581 – 6 August 1638) was a Scottish nobleman, the son of James Stewart, 2nd Lord Doune and Elizabeth Stuart, 2nd Countess of Moray.

== Early years ==
Moray was only around the age of 11 when his father was murdered and within months of the deed, letters were procured from the King superseding all action to be taken against him, as his father's heir, and against his mother for a period of up to two years, which was made law by a ratification of Parliament. At the same time, a ratification was made to him of the charter by his grandfather, James Stewart, 1st Lord Doune, and his wife Margaret Campbell, of the Lordship of Doune, dated 6 January 1587.

In 1595 he obtained a passport to travel abroad, passing through England. However, in June 1595 he wrote a joint letter with his uncle Henry Stewart, Commendator of Inchcolm, explaining he would not travel. He was living at Doune Castle at that time.

On 16 February 1598, he was made charge, along with his tutors and curators, to inter the body of his deceased father, which until that time remained unburied. Whilst still a minor, he was charged with being a rebel for not appearing before the Privy Council on 5 March 1601.

The bitter feud between Moray and Huntly greatly pained the King, who had set out to quell the feud lest it cause serious harm to the realm. So, on 23 February 1603, the two parties were nominally reconciled and the King declared a decree of arbitration on the matter, on 3 May 1604. For reasons which are still unclear, his inheritance of the titles of his ancestors were seen to be not on a satisfactory basis. So on 11 August 1607, just after he came of age, he received from Parliament the ratification needed to bolster his entitlements to those family charters, especially those given to his grandfather James Stewart, 1st Earl of Moray, and to ensure the inheritance of these titles by his own descendants.

== Later career ==
He married Lady Anne Gordon, daughter of George Gordon, 1st Marquess of Huntly and Henrietta Stewart, on 2 October 1607 (contract). This was arranged by the King, James, to heal the ongoing feud between the Stewart and Gordon families.

In 1618 John Taylor, the London Water Poet, visited the Earl and Countess at Darnaway Castle for four days on his pilgrimage in Scotland, after staying four days at Ballachastel with the Grants. The Earl was responsible for completing Castle Stuart on the banks of the Moray Firth.

He died on 6 August 1638, at Darnaway, and was buried with little pomp and ceremony.

== Family and children ==
He was survived by two sons and a daughter, from his marriage to Lady Anne Gordon.

- James Stuart, 4th Earl of Moray, who succeeded as earl on 16 November 1638.
- Lady Mary Stuart, who married on 24 April 1640, James Grant, 7th of Freuchie (24 June 1616 - October 1663), and had issue.
- George Stuart, who died unmarried.

Peerage of Scotland
Preceded by James Stuart	Earl of Moray; 1592–1638	Succeeded by James Stuart
