= Donibristle =

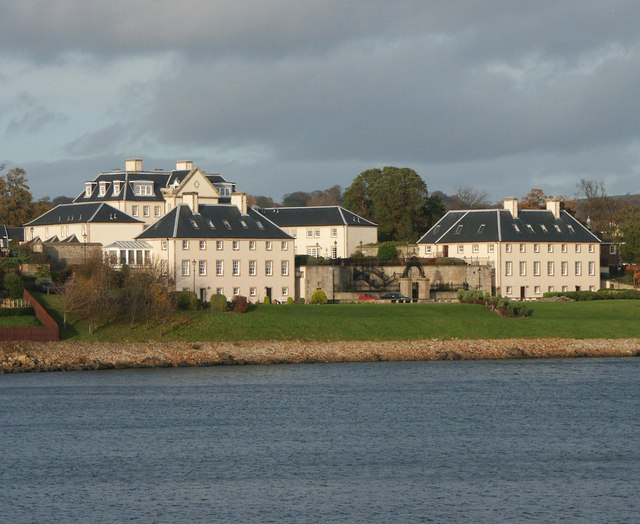
- The modern Donibristle House, with the 18th-century wings in front

- Location within Fife
- 56.0315°N 3.3492°W
- Location: Dalgety Bay, Fife, Scotland

History
- Built: circa 1700–1720
- Built for: Earl of Moray
- Demolished: 1858 after fire
- Rebuilt: 1990s

Site notes
- Architect: Alexander McGill

Listed Building – Category A
- Designated: 24 November 1972
- Reference no.: LB3647

Donibristle (Scots: also Dunibirsle) was a house and estate in Fife, Scotland, on the coast of the Firth of Forth. Only the wings of the house remain, within the modern settlement of Dalgety Bay. They are now protected as a category A listed building. Donibristle was the scene of the killing of James Stewart, 2nd Earl of Moray, in 1592, which is remembered in the ballad "The Bonnie Earl O' Moray".

== History ==
=== The first house ===
Around 1540, James Stewart of Doune was made Commendator of Inchcolm Abbey, which is located on an island in the Firth of Forth. Donibristle was then a property of the abbey, and James used it as a residence. In 1580, his son James was raised to the peerage as Lord Doune. Lord Doune's son James Stewart married, in 1581, Elizabeth Stuart, 2nd Countess of Moray, and assumed, jure uxoris (in right of his wife), the title of the Earl of Moray. Moray quarrelled with George Gordon, 1st Marquess of Huntly, and on 7 February 1592 Huntly attacked and burned Donibristle. Moray attempted to flee but was caught and killed.

=== The second house ===
The old house was refurbished by James Stuart, 4th Earl of Moray between 1632 and 1653. His wife, Margaret Home, had a cabinet room which held a variety of treasures and curiosities, including a miniature bowling game with ivory pins, a painting of a parrot, a loadstone, and telescope bought in London in 1634. Many of the furnishings were bought by her mother Mary, Countess of Home. An inventory of their library includes the L'Astrée and a book by the calligrapher Esther Inglis. Near the house there was a fountain with a bronze figure of winged Mercury posed on a turtle, possibly the work of Hubert Le Sueur. The water jet issued from the mouth of the turtle, as Thomas Kirk described in 1677.

=== The third house ===
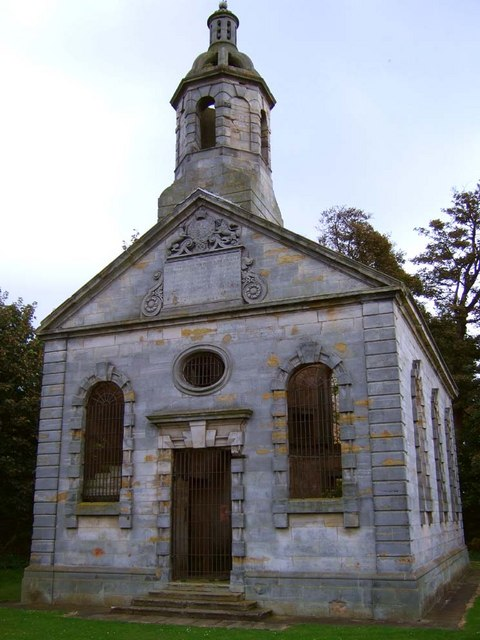
Donibristle Chapel

A new house was constructed around 1700, and around 1720 L-plan wings of three storeys were added, to the designs of Alexander McGill. McGill also designed the mortuary chapel of the Earls of Moray on the estate, which is dated 1731 and is also category A listed. In the late 18th century landscape gardener Thomas White laid out the parkland. James Gillespie Graham prepared plans for Jacobean-style remodelling in the earlier 19th century. The main block of the house burned down in 1858. The surviving wings are linked by a subterranean passage and a decorative wrought-iron screen, said to be the finest early 18th century wrought-iron screen still in existence in Scotland.

=== The fourth house ===
During World War I the estate was used by the Royal Naval Air Service as an airfield, which was expanded during World War II as RNAS Donibristle (HMS Merlin). From 1962 the airfield and the rest of the estate was developed as Dalgety Bay, a privately funded new town. Begun by Copthall Holdings, the site was taken over by the Scottish Homes Investment Company and construction continued into the 1970s. In the late 20th century the wings of Donibristle House and the nearby stable block were restored as housing, and a new apartment building was erected in place of the main block of the house.
