= John Grant (died 1637) =

Scottish landowner

John Grant of Freuchie (1596-1637) was a Scottish landowner.

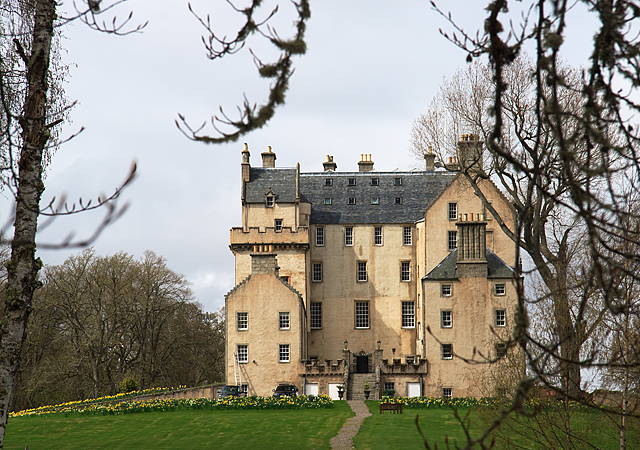
James Grant built or refurbished a long gallery, or Ballachastell, now called Castle Grant

== Career ==
He was a son of John Grant and Lilias Murray, a daughter of John Murray of Tullibardine and Agnes Graham. James VI and I and Anne of Denmark came to their wedding at Tullibardine Castle. The king and his valet John Wemyss of Logie brought masque costumes and danced at the wedding feast.

John Grant was educated by Patrick Inglis, who later became kirk minister of Kirkwall. After his marriage in 1614, he was known as John Grant of Mulben. He seems to have been knighted in 1617 when King James visited Scotland. James requested that the Laird of Grant send ptarmigan and capercaillie as Scottish speciality foods to impress his retinue on their arrival in Newcastle.

John Grant managed the family estates with his father and travelled to Edinburgh in 1620 to meet the lawyers Thomas Hope, Thomas Nicolson, and James Oliphant. Their route took them to Blair Atholl and Huntingtower. The legal dispute concerned teind duties owed to the Marquess of Huntly and John Gordon of Buckie. In Edinburgh, John Grant found that some of his followers were in town to settle a dispute by legal means. Grant was able to settle the matter himself, without using the law courts, which was deemed more to the credit of the chiefs of the clan.

John Grant became the sixth Laird of Grant or Freuchie in 1622. He sold the lands of Lethen to Alexander Brodie of East Grange, as the expenses of managing his estates and visiting Edinburgh were very large. Lethen had belonged to his mother, Lilias Murray, and she also helped by selling some of her lands in Cromdale. Additionally, Lilias Murray took up residence at Castle Grant, and in return made over 1000 merks of her annual income to her son.

In August 1631 he was in London and went to see his uncle Patrick Murray, 1st Earl of Tullibardine at Theobalds.

== Sculpture and decoration at Castle Grant ==
The family home was Freuchie Castle, then known as Ballachastell. The house is now called Castle Grant. John Grant commissioned more than a dozen sculptures of heraldic beasts and animals from Ralph Rawlinson in 1629. Grant objected to two choices of beasts and Rawlinson offered to sculpt a gorgon and a rhinoceros. Rawlinson is chiefly known for his work on a pageant at Edinburgh Castle and Holyrood Palace in 1617. In this entertainment St George fought a dragon and Highland soldiers captured the Castle of Envy. Rawlinson also carved sundials, and worked for the Marquess of Huntly at the Chanonry of Ross in 1633.

In John Grant's time there was a long gallery and he engaged a painter, John Anderson of Aberdeen, to decorate a new wooden ceiling in "fine colours" in 1635. Anderson was also to gild the carved initials or hearaldy of four "storm" or dormer windows which lit the space. Anderson also supplied and decorated four picture frames for portraits.

Many letters and documents from the Grant family papers were printed by William Fraser in the Chiefs of Grant in 1883. The family archive is now held by the National Records of Scotland.

== Marriage and children ==
John Grant married Mary Ogilvie, a daughter of Walter Ogilvie of Deskford and Findlater in 1614. Their children included:

- James Grant (1616-1663), later Laird of Freuchie.
- Patrick Grant of Cluniemor and Cluniebeg, known as the Tutor of Grant, who married Sibilla MacKenzie
- Mary Grant, who married (1) Lord Lewis Gordon, 3rd Marquess of Huntly, and (2), James Ogilvy, 2nd Earl of Airlie
- Lilias Grant, who married John Byres of Coitis
