= James Stuart, 4th Earl of Moray =

Scottish peer (c.1611–1653)

James Stuart, 4th Earl of Moray (c. 1611 – 4 March 1653) was a Scottish nobleman and landowner.

He was the son of James Stuart, 3rd Earl of Moray and Lady Anne Gordon, a daughter of George Gordon, 1st Marquess of Huntly and Henrietta Stewart.

He married Lady Margaret Home, daughter of Alexander Home, 1st Earl of Home and Mary Dudley, on 18 October 1627 (contract). The couple had eight children:

- James Stuart, Lord Doune, who married Katherine Tollemache.
- Alexander Stuart, 5th Earl of Moray, married after 1658 Emilia Balfour (? – January 1683)
- Hon. Francis Stuart of Cullello, Fife
- Hon. Archibald Stuart of Dunearn, Fife (? – February 1688), Governor of Stirling Castle, married in 1669 Anna Henderson, daughter of Sir John Henderson, 5th of Fordell and wife Margaret Menteith, and had:
  - Charles Stuart (?–1732), married Jean Hamilton, daughter of Alexander Hamilton (ancestor of Barons Hamilton) and had issue: James, Jean and Mary
  - Margaret Stuart (? – October 1719), married firstly to Sir Archibald Stewart, 2nd Baronet, of Burray (?–1704), and had issue, and married secondly to David Leslie, 5th Lord Lindores (? – July 1719), without issue
- Lady Margaret Stuart (? – January 1667), married in 1654 Sir Alexander Sutherland, 1st Lord Duffus (c. 1621 – 31 August 1674), and had issue
- Lady Henrietta Stuart, married in 1662 Sir Hugh Campbell of Calder (or of Cawdor), whose daughter, Margaret married Hugh Rose, 15th of Kilravock and was the mother of Hugh Rose, 16th of Kilravock. Their other daughter was Anne (b. abt 1676), who married Murdoch MacLean, 13th of Lochbuie (Abt 1672–1727) in November 1705. This couple had a daughter, Margaret (b. abt 1708), who married Donald Campbell, of Airds (1704–1775) in 1729. They are the great-grandparents of Sir John Campbell, of Airds (1807–1853).
- Lady Anne Stuart (1644 – died young)
- Lady Anne Stuart (1650–1719), married in 1666 David Ross of Balnagowen
- Lady Mary Stuart (Darnaway Castle, Elginshire, 1628 – May 1668), married at Canongate, Edinburgh, Midlothian, on 13 May 1650 Archibald Campbell, 9th Earl of Argyll (Dalkeith, Edinburgh, Midlothian, 26 February 1628/9 – Cross of Edinburgh, Edinburgh, Midlothian, 30 June 1685), and had issue

The Earl and Countess refurbished their house at Donibristle, employing English artisans including painters, Edward Arthur and George Crawford. They installed a fountain with a bronze figure of Mercury. The Countess lived as a widow till 1683, she maintained Moray House in Edinburgh and its gardens, and planted woods at Donibristle.

In 1677 and 1679 there were portraits of "Lord Doune" and Ham House in "Her Grace's Bed Chamber", possibly of this Lord Moray before 1638 as "Lord Doune" or his eldest son, James, also Lord Doune, who married Katherine Tollemache in December 1677. A portrait of Katherine, Lady Doune at Ham was the work of Lodewijk van der Helst. Ham belonged to the earl's brother-in-law, John Maitland, 1st Duke of Lauderdale, whose first wife was Lady Anne Home.

== Sources ==
- Charles Mosley, editor, Burke's Peerage, Baronetage & Knightage, 107th edition, 3 volumes (Wilmington, Delaware, U.S.A.: Burke's Peerage (Genealogical Books) Ltd, 2003), pages 1512 and 1865.
- L. G. Pine, The New Extinct Peerage 1884-1971: Containing Extinct, Abeyant, Dormant and Suspended Peerages With Genealogies and Arms (London, U.K.: Heraldry Today, 1972), page 109.
- G.E. Cokayne; with Vicary Gibbs, H.A. Doubleday, Geoffrey H. White, Duncan Warrand and Lord Howard de Walden, editors, The Complete Peerage of England, Scotland, Ireland, Great Britain and the United Kingdom, Extant, Extinct or Dormant, new ed., 13 volumes in 14 (1910-1959; reprint in 6 volumes, Gloucester, U.K.: Alan Sutton Publishing, 2000), volume I, page 205 and volume VIII, page 4.
- Sir James Balfour Paul, editor, The Scots Peerage : founded on Wood's ed. of Sir Robert Douglas's Peerage of Scotland; containing an historical and genealogical account of the nobility of that kingdom, volume VI, pp. 316–322, (David Douglas, 1909). Archive.org, https://archive.org/details/scotspeeragefoun06pauluoft/page/320/mode/2up

Peerage of Scotland
Preceded by James Stuart	Earl of Moray; 1638–1653	Succeeded by Alexander Stuart
