= The Bonnie Earl o' Moray =

Scottish song and ballad

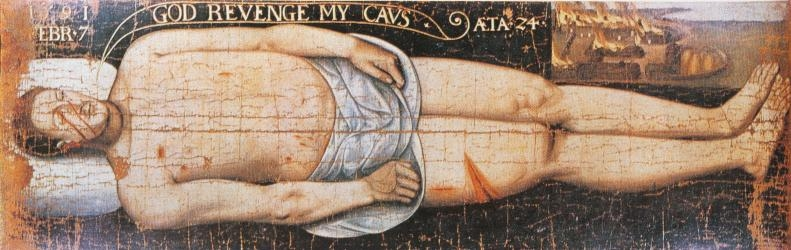
The Bonnie Earl of Moray, anonymous "vendetta portrait" of the murdered James Stewart, 2nd Earl of Moray, 1592

"The Bonnie Earl o' Moray" (Child 181, Roud 334) is a popular Scottish ballad, which may date from as early as the 17th century.

== Background ==
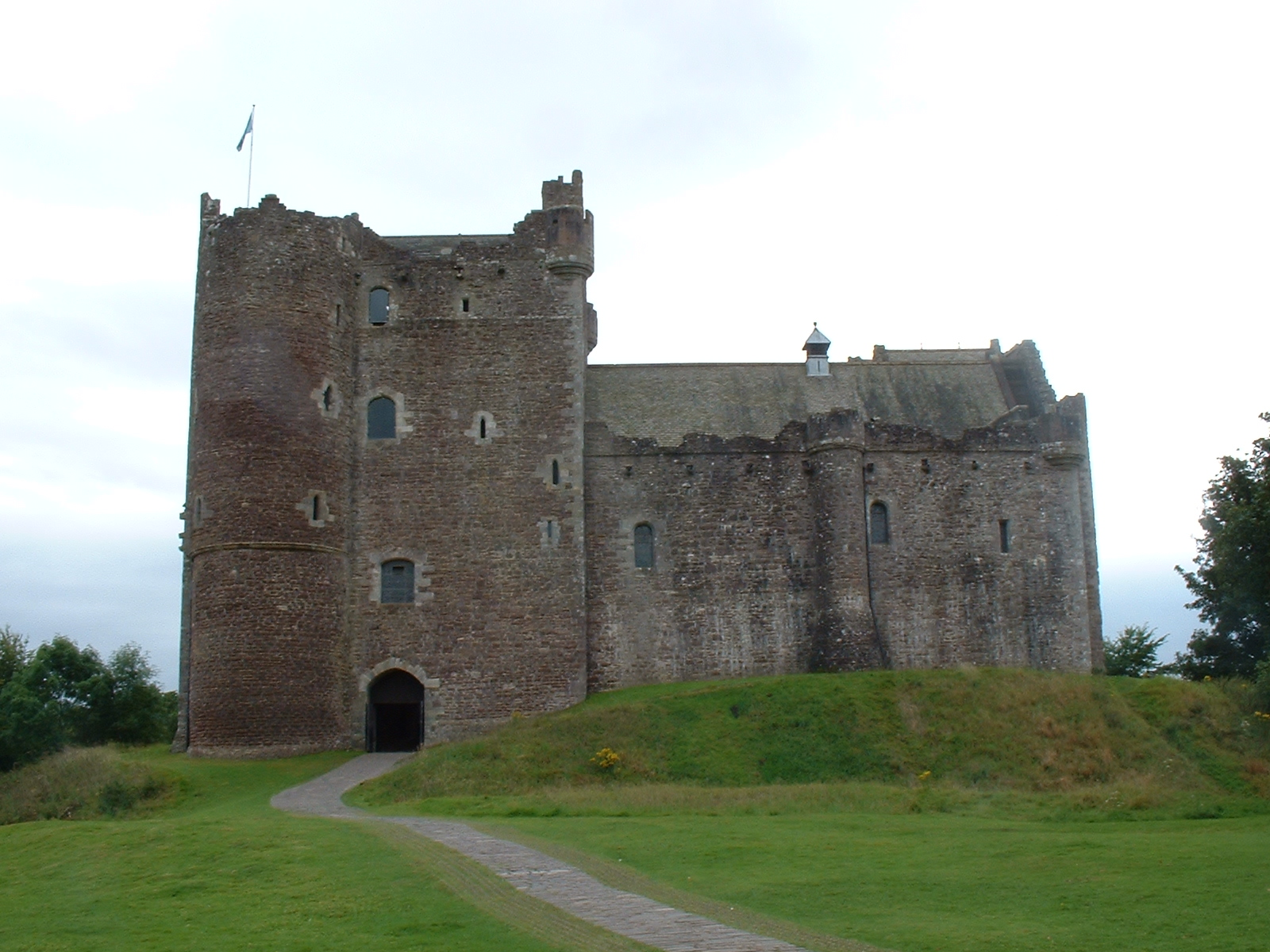
Castle Doune, Moray's family seat in the late 16th century

The ballad touches on a true story stemming from the rivalry of James Stewart, Earl of Moray (pronounced Murray), and the Earl of Huntly (pronounced Huntly), which culminated in Huntly's murder of Moray in 1592. The exact circumstances that led to the murder are not known for certain, but both their families, the Stewarts of Doune (pronounced "doon") and the Gordons of Huntly, had a history of territorial rivalry and competition for royal favour. In his notes on the ballad, Francis James Child relates how Huntly, eager to prove that Moray was plotting with the Earl of Bothwell against King James VI, received a commission to bring Moray to trial. In the attempt to apprehend him, Moray's house at Donibristle in Fife was set on fire and the visiting Sheriff of Moray killed. Moray fled the house, but was chased and killed in its grounds, betrayed, it was said, by the glow of his burning helmet tassel. His last words, according to the (probably apocryphal) story related by Walter Scott, deserve special mention. Huntly slashed him across the face with his sword, and as he lay dying Moray said "Ye hae spilt a better face than yer ain" ("You have spoiled a better face than your own"). The killing was widely condemned. Moray's mother, Margaret Campbell, had a painting made of her son's dead body, as evidence of his multiple wounds, bearing the legend "God Revenge My Caus". Her intention was to show this publicly at the Cross in Edinburgh, but the King ignored her request.

== Lyrics and themes ==
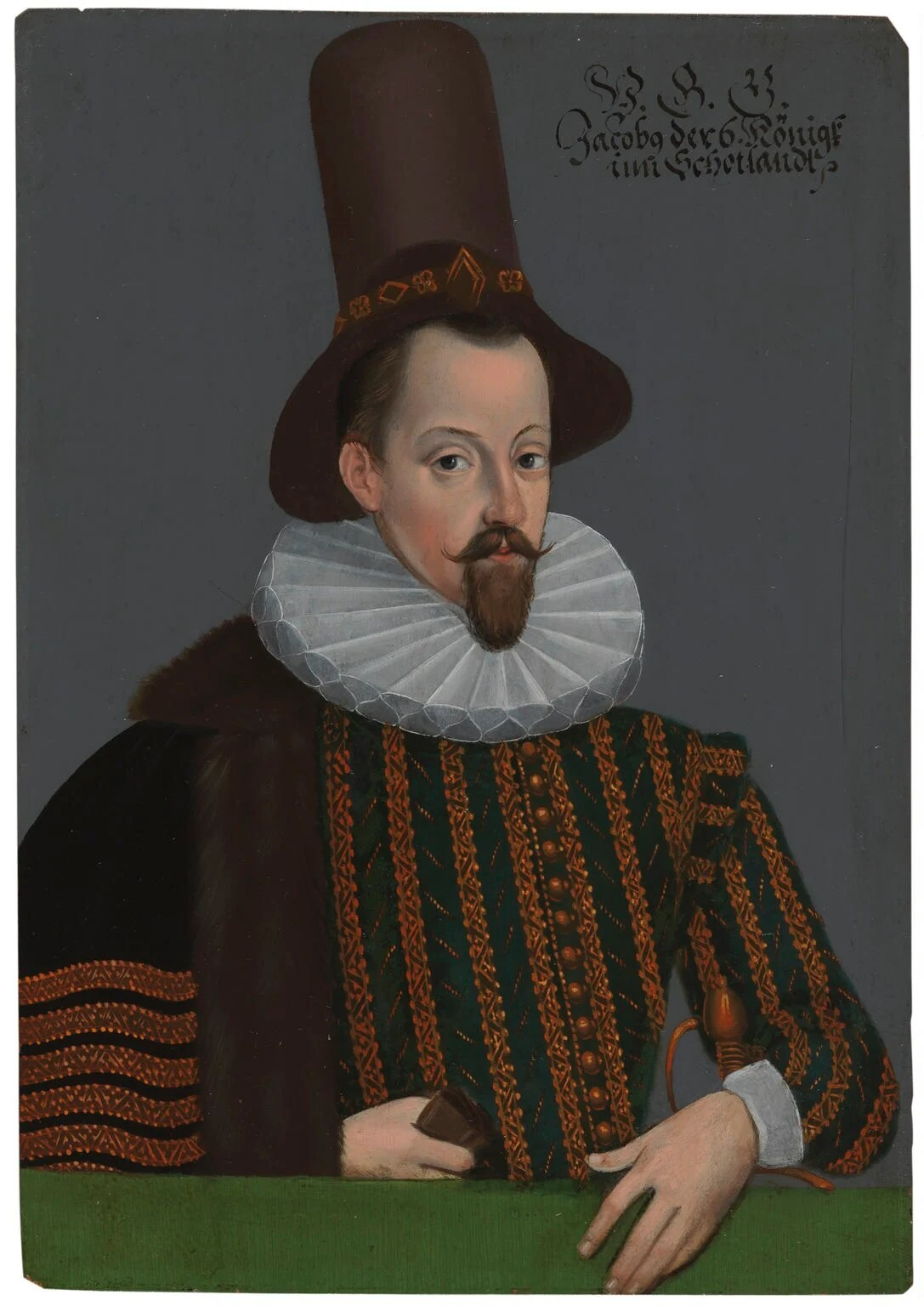
King James VI painted in 1590, two years before the murder

The King's reaction in the ballad is to condemn Huntly's action (in verse 2):

"Now wae be to thee, Huntly!
And wherefore did you sae?
I bade you bring him wi you,
But forbade you him to slay."

Nevertheless, James did not punish Huntly, prompting rumours of his own complicity in the murder. It is possible that the inclusion of the King's clear condemnation of the deed (whether or not it was ever expressed by him) was an effort to prevent the ballad from appearing treasonous. However, we can discount the ballad's claim that Moray was the Queen's lover (hinting at a possible motive for James's complicity). The ballad, which praises Moray as "a braw gallant" (Scots, calland), was most likely composed by one of his supporters. The words "Oh he might have been a king!" should not be taken to imply that he could have become King. More likely, they conveyed the sense that he possessed the required attributes of a king and so could easily have been one.

It is from the first verse of "The Bonnie Earl o' Moray" that the term mondegreen, meaning a misheard lyric, came into popular use among folk musicians.

Ye Highlands and ye Lawlands,
Oh where have you been?
They have slain the Earl o' Moray
And layd him on the green.

When the ballad is sung in Scots, the form is different from the more anglicised version in the Child catalogue. For example, the verses given above are sung with these words:

Ye Hielands an ye Lowlands
O, whaur hae ye been
They hae slain the Earl o' Moray
And lain him on the green.

Now wae betide thee, Huntly
And whaurfor did ye sae?
I hae bade ye bring him wi ye
But forbade ye him tae slay.

A German translation by Johann Gottfried Herder, Murrays Ermordung, published 1778–79, was set to music by Johannes Brahms in 1858. The ballad was also set to music by Hugh S. Roberton and Benjamin Britten.

== Mondegreen ==
The American writer Sylvia Wright coined the term "mondegreen" in an essay "The Death of Lady Mondegreen", which was published in Harper's Magazine in November 1954. In the essay, Wright described how, as a young girl, she misheard the final two lines of the above verse as "they have slain the Earl o' Moray, and Lady Mondegreen." She said that she always imagined the Earl dying beside his faithful lover "Lady Mondegreen", and refused to hear the real words, because they were less romantic than her misheard version. The term "mondegreen" has since been adopted for any misheard song lyric which changes the meaning of the original.

== Recordings ==
Versions of the ballad can be heard on Isla St Clair's album Great Songs and Ballads of Scotland and Irish-American singer Robbie O'Connell's album Close to the Bone. It was also recorded by Robin Hall and Jimmie Macgregor for the album Scottish Choice (1961). Live version recorded by The Corries on their album "Live from Scotland Volume 4" (1977).

English composer Benjamin Britten arranged the song for voice and piano sometime before 11 December 1940, and included it in the first volume of his folk song arrangements.
