= Darnaway Castle =

Castle in Moray, Scotland

Coordinates: 57.5743°N 3.6828°W

Designations

Inventory of Gardens and Designed Landscapes in Scotland
- Official name: Darnaway Castle
- Designated: 30 June 1987
- Reference no.: GDL00133

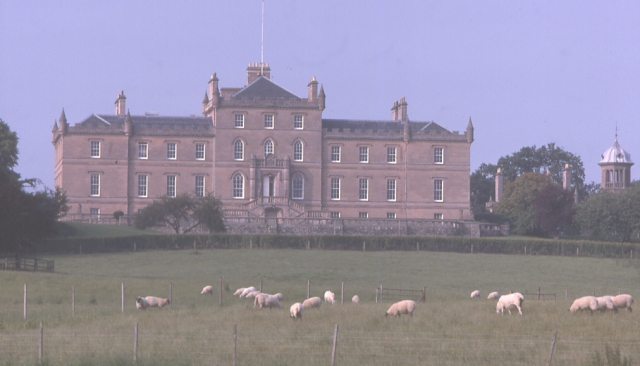
Darnaway Castle

Darnaway Castle, also known as Tarnaway Castle, is located in Darnaway Forest, 3 miles (5 km) southwest of Forres in Moray, Scotland. This was Comyn land, given to Thomas Randolph along with the Earldom of Moray by King Robert I. The castle has remained the seat of the Earls of Moray ever since. Rebuilt in 1810, it retains the old banqueting hall, capable of accommodating 1,000 people.

== Etymology ==
The name Darnaway represents an anglicisation of the Gaelic form Taranaich. Taranaich conserves an early Brittonic form, Taranumagos, derived from the elements taranu meaning "thunder" and magos, "a plain" (Welsh taran-maes).

== Randolphs and Douglases ==
Sir Thomas Randolph probably built the first castle. John, 3rd Earl, died at the Battle of Neville's Cross in 1346 without male heirs, and the earldom went to Patrick Dunbar, who was the husband of one of John's daughters. The male line of the Dunbars failed around 1430, and the earldom went to the Douglases. When Archibald Douglas, Earl of Moray died in battle on 1 May 1455, fighting with his brothers against King James III, who had decided to curb the power wielded by the Douglases, the Moray title and estates were forfeited along with various other Douglas possessions. It now passed to the Murrays, and then to the Stuart family, with whose descendants it remains.

== Medieval great hall ==
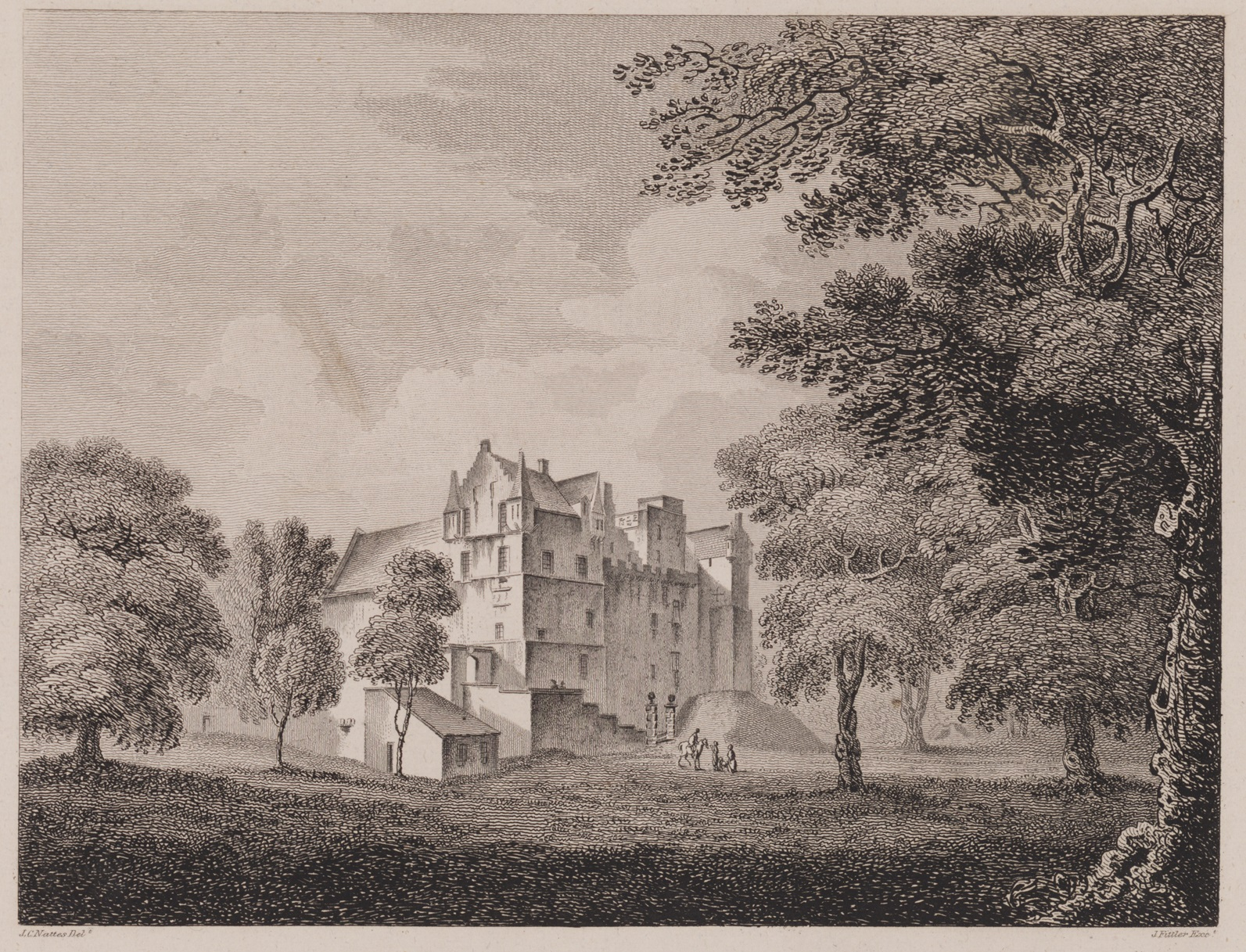
The castle in 1804, before its reconstruction

The banqueting hall is the only remaining portion of the castle that was erected in 1450 by Archibald Douglas, Earl of Moray, and retains its medieval hammerbeam roof, making it one of only two medieval halls in Scotland with its original roof, "a specimen almost unique in Scotland."

The forest of Darnaway was an important source of timber, and in March 1497 King James IV sent a priest David Arnot to supervise carpenters taking "great trees" for the royal artillery. In 1508 and 1509, timber was cut to build the king's ships.

The Great Hall was re-roofed with "spune thak", wooden shingles hewn by a carpenter, at the command of James IV, and on 20 November 1501 the maidens of Forres came to Darnaway to sing for him. James IV kept his mistress Janet Kennedy at Darnaway with their children and her companion Katrine Douglas. In 1502 he sent a lutenist, Adam Dickson, to Darnaway to entertain them. In October 1504 he brought four Italian minstrels and an African drummer, known as the "More taubronar". The maidens of Forres danced for him and the next day, the maidens of Darnaway danced.

On 13 October 1505, James IV played cards at Darnaway. New rushes were strewn in his chamber. On 16 October he watched dancing described as "capers" or "capparis" in the hall. James IV visited Darnaway again in September 1506, and the "maddines in Dernway" sang for him. James IV moved on to Elgin and then to the "Kirk of Logy", where women sang for him.

The hall was already notable in 1562 when an English observer Thomas Randolph described it as, "verie fayer and large builded." Mary, Queen of Scots visited on 10 September 1562, and held a meeting of the Privy Council. She sent an order to John Gordon to surrender the castles of Findlater and Auchindoun.

== Feud ==
Regent Moray was at Darnaway on 24 June 1569 and gave 30 shillings to "certain women that sang". Colin Campbell, 6th Earl of Argyll, the second husband of Agnes Keith, Countess of Moray, died at Darnaway on 10 September 1584. James VI stayed on 14 July 1589.

In 1590 a feud started between the Earl of Huntly and James Stewart, 2nd Earl of Moray, after the widow of the Grant of Ballindalloch married John Gordon, son Thomas Gordon of Cluny. John Grant, former Tutor of Ballindaloch, the administrator of the estate, killed one of John Grant's servants. The Earl of Huntly went to Ballindalloch in November 1590 to arrest the Tutor. The Chief of Grant, John Grant of Freuchie promised to deliver the Tutor and his accomplices, accused of murder and other crimes, to Huntly Castle. However, Freuchie joined with the Tutor's men and the Earl of Moray, and came to Darnaway, and there shot pistols at Huntly's officers and cannon from the castle, and killed John Gordon, brother of the Laird of Cluny.

== Furnishings in 1591 ==
A list of the best goods at Darnaway was made after the deaths of 2nd Earl of Moray and Elizabeth Stuart, 2nd Countess of Moray. The Earl's best bed had valances of red velvet and cloth of gold, and curtains of red Spanish taffeta trimmed with gold, valued at £1000 Scots. A turned wooden mazer bound with silver was valued at £20 Scots. There was tapestry in his bedchamber and in the great hall. There was also a little hall at this time with a high table for dining. Darnaway Castle was equipped with spears, halberds, muskets, and an iron rod with ten shackles for prisoners. The Earl of Atholl removed these furnishings.

== Randolph's leap ==
To the south of the castle, where the River Findhorn rushes through a gorge, Randolph's Leap commemorates the sort of long-jumping usually associated with Rob Roy MacGregor. It was probably not attempted by Earl Randolph, but by his quarry, Alastair Comyn of nearby Dunphail. More can be learnt about the tale of Randolph’s Leap at the River Findhorn Heritage Centre at nearby Logie Steading.

== Planting ==
Between 1767 and 1781 Francis Stuart, 9th Earl of Moray planted the estate with over 8 million pine trees.

== Trivia ==
Darnaway gives its name to Darnaway Street in the Earl of Moray's Edinburgh development, the Moray Estate.
