= Grey willow =

Grey willow or gray willow may refer to:

- Salix atrocinerea, a species of willow native to Europe commonly called grey willow
- Salix cinerea, a species of willow native to Europe and western Asia, also occasionally called grey sallow
- Salix glauca, a species of willow native to northern North America, Europe and Asia
