= James Stewart, 2nd Earl of Moray =

Scottish noble

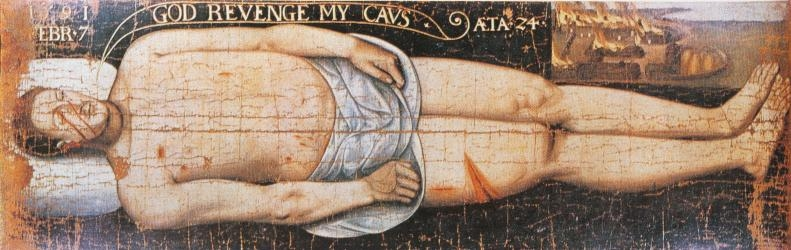
The Bonnie Earl of Moray, the anonymous "vendetta portrait" of the murdered earl, 1592

James Stewart, 2nd Lord Doune, jure uxoris 2nd Earl of Moray (c. 1565 – 7 February 1592), was a Scottish nobleman. He was murdered by George Gordon, Earl of Huntly as the culmination of a vendetta. Known as the Bonnie Earl for his good looks, he became the subject of a popular ballad, "The Bonnie Earl of Moray".

== Biography ==
Stewart was the eldest son of James Stewart, 1st Lord Doune, of Doune Castle, Perthshire, and Lady Margaret Campbell. He was a male-line descendant of Robert II of Scotland through his second son, the Duke of Albany, whose brother was the Earl of Buchan (the "Wolf of Badenoch"). His father was created Lord Doune on 24 November 1581. From his distant relative King James VI, he received in the year 1580 a gift of the ward and marriage of the two daughters of the Regent Moray. In January 1581, he married Elizabeth Stewart, the elder daughter. The wedding was celebrated on 31 January in Fife with a tournament of "running at the ring" and James VI of Scotland took part in costume. Two days later, the party came to Leith, where a water pageant culminated with a theatrical assault on a Papal Castel Sant'Angelo, built on boats on the water of Leith. Some of Elizabeth's relatives thought the Lord Doune's son was not of sufficient status to marry her. He soon after assumed, jure uxoris, the title of the Earl of Moray. Stewart held the office of Collector General, receiving income from the church.

Stewart aimed to make himself the most powerful lord in the north-east at the expense of his neighbour, the Earl of Huntly. On 1 August 1588, he was appointed a commissioner for executing the act against the Spanish Armada, and on 5 March 1590, was commissioned to execute the acts against the Jesuits. He then foolishly entered into an alliance with his wife's famous cousin Francis Stewart, 5th Earl of Bothwell, a notorious conspirator who had repeatedly made attempts on the life of King James VI. In "The Bonnie Earl of Moray" it is also claimed that Stewart "was the Queen's love", which could imply jealousy on the King's part over the affections of his Queen, Anne of Denmark; however, there is no evidence that Stewart was the Queen's lover. In late 1590, he decided, along with the Earl of Atholl, to assist the Laird of Grant when his house was being besieged by Huntly; Huntly retreated to Edinburgh, and on 23 January 1591, presented a supplication against Moray for his "having taken part with the malefactors in the north", both earls were commanded to proceed to Edinburgh and sign bands to keep the peace.

Huntly obtained a special commission to pursue Bothwell and his associates, who James VI feared were planning a rebellion. To prevent Bothwell from obtaining shelter with the Earl of Moray, a distant cousin and ally, Moray was induced by Lord Ochiltree, who was specially deputed by the King, to come south on the condition of receiving a pardon. Moray, in expectation of a summons to the court, had arrived at Donibristle, a house on the Fife coast owned by his mother. On 7 February 1592, Donibristle was suddenly beset by the followers of Huntly, who called on him to surrender. He declined to do so, and Huntly set fire to the house. Moray stayed for a time inside, and, suddenly dashing out, broke through the cordon surrounding the house, and made for the rocks on the seashore. The glow of his burning helmet tassle, however, was said to have betrayed his location and he was killed.

The next day, the corpses of the earl and of Dunbar, Sheriff of Moray, who had also been killed in the attack, were brought to Leith by the earl's mother, the formidable Margaret Campbell of Argyll. Margaret intended to confront James VI and demand that Huntly be brought to justice. While the King proclaimed his innocence in the affair, Margaret Campbell increased the pressure by having her son's body displayed in the Church of St. Giles and refusing to bury him, and by commissioning a gory 'vendetta portrait' showing his wounds. When Margaret died shortly afterwards, James Stewart's body remained on public display for five years, and was only buried when the King ordered his son James to do so. Captain Gordon, one of Huntly's followers, who being wounded was unable to escape to the north, was brought to Edinburgh and executed; but this was not enough to satisfy popular feeling, and the King deemed it prudent to retire from Edinburgh to Glasgow, until Huntly entered himself in ward in Blackness Castle. This Huntly did on 12 March, but on the 20th he was released on giving surety that on six days' notice he would appear and stand his trial whenever called on to do so. The murder remains famous to this day as the earl was just 27 years old at the time of his death and his murderer's punishment was a mere week-long house arrest.

== Family ==
By his wife, Elizabeth Stewart, whom he married between 23 January 1580 and 1581 and who died three months before he did, he had two sons and three daughters:

- Lady Grizel Stuart, married Sir Robert Innes, 1st Baronet Innes, by whom she had issue.
- Lady Margaret Stuart (1591- 4 August 1639), married firstly, as his second wife, Charles Howard, 1st Earl of Nottingham, by whom she had issue; and secondly William Monson, Viscount Monson
- James Stuart, 3rd Earl of Moray (before 1591- 6 August 1638), married Lady Anne Gordon, by whom he had issue, including James Stuart, 4th Earl of Moray
- Lady Elizabeth Stuart, married John Abernethy, 8th Lord Abernethy of Saltoun
- Sir Francis Stewart, who was well known in London literary society, and is said to have frequented the literary meetings at the Mermaid tavern

Peerage of Scotland
Preceded by Elizabeth Stewart	Earl of Moray	Succeeded by James Stuart
