= Castle Grant =

Castle in Highland, Scotland

Coordinates: 57°21′7″N 3°35′41″W

Designations

Inventory of Gardens and Designed Landscapes in Scotland
- Official name: Castle Grant
- Designated: 30 March 2003
- Reference no.: GDL00092

The gate house of Castle Grant

Castle Grant stands a mile north of Grantown-on-Spey and was the former seat of the Clan Grant chiefs of Strathspey in Highlands, Scotland. It was originally named Freuchie Castle but was renamed Grant in 1694. The castle is a Category A listed building and the grounds are included in the Inventory of Gardens and Designed Landscapes in Scotland. The castle was sold by the Grant family in 1983, remaining in private ownership since.

== History ==
=== 15th-16th centuries ===
The castle is a Z-plan tower house that dates from the fifteenth century. The lands had been held by the Clan Comyn but passed to the Grants in the fifteenth century and it became their main stronghold.

The castle was originally named Freuchie (from 'Fraoichaich', Scottish Gaelic descriptor for being of or abounding in, Heather) Castle and James Grant of Freuchie supported James V of Scotland.

=== 17th-18th centuries ===
The sixth laird, John Grant, made some improvements to the building. The castle was decorated with stone heraldic beasts and animals carved by Ralph Rawlinson. The long gallery and the heads of the dormer windows were painted and gilded by John Anderson of Aberdeen. Although the Grants were Protestants, they joined James Graham, 1st Marquess of Montrose during the Scottish Civil War in the 1640s. The name of the castle changed from Freuchie Castle to Castle Grant in 1694 when the lands were made into the regality of Grant.

Ludovick Grant, the eighth laird, supported the Hanoverians against the Stewarts and fought against the Jacobites in both the Jacobite rising of 1715 and the Jacobite rising of 1745. However Castle Grant was occupied by the Jacobites.

In 1787, Robert Burns visited Castle Grant.

=== Modern history ===
Castle Grant from rear

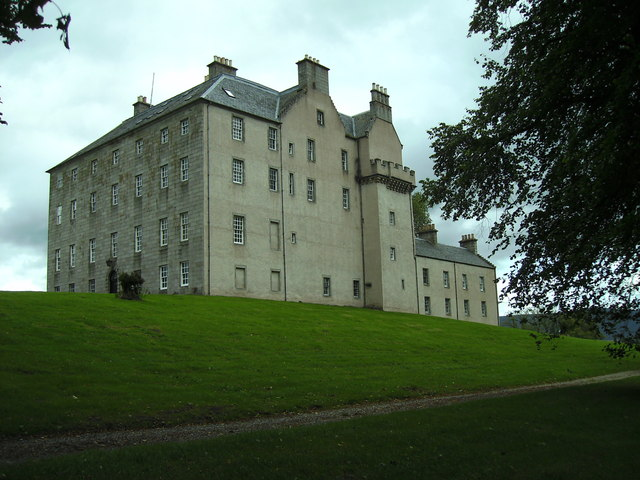
Castle Grant from the front

The castle was restored by Sir Robert Lorimer in 1912.

After being requisitioned by the Army during the Second World War, the Castle was unoccupied for four decades. A fire in August 1982 caused further damage. Its sale to a development company the following year was somewhat of a surprise, with the Clan Grant Society having failed in a bid to buy it. It was derelict, with the costs of renovation being estimated at £400,000 by 1984. The developers ran out of money and it was abandoned again.

Graham Keeler purchased the castle in 1994. Some restoration took place in the 1990s. The property was purchased for £720,000 by businessman Craig Whyte in 2006. Castle Grant was seized by the Bank of Scotland after Whyte, who had led Rangers F.C. into its administration and liquidation in 2012, refused to make mortgage payments. It was sold in September 2014 to ex-CEO of the Russian Author Society, Sergey Fedotov, who was later arrested for fraud.

The current owners purchased the castle in 2022 and it is now being restored as their family home.

== See also ==
- Castles in Scotland
