= George Gordon, 1st Marquess of Huntly =

Scottish nobleman (1562–1636)

George Gordon
- 6th Earl of Huntly
- Tenure: 1599–1636
- Successor: George Gordon, 2nd Marquess of Huntly
- Other titles: 1st Marquess of Huntly
- Born: 1562
- Died: 13 June 1636 (aged 73–74); Dundee
- Spouse: Lady Henrietta Stewart
- Issue: 6, including Anne and George
- Parents: George Gordon, 5th Earl of Huntly; Anne Hamilton

George Gordon, 1st Marquess of Huntly, 6th Earl of Huntly (1562 – 13 June 1636) was a Scottish nobleman who took a leading role in the political and military life of Scotland in the late 16th century, and around the time of the Union of the Crowns.

== Biography ==
The son of George Gordon, 5th Earl of Huntly, and of Anne, daughter of James Hamilton, 2nd Earl of Arran and Duke of Châtellerault, he was educated in France as a Roman Catholic. He took part as the 6th Earl of Huntly in the plot which led to the execution of James Douglas, 4th Earl of Morton in 1581 and in the conspiracy which saved King James VI from the Ruthven raiders in 1583. In 1588 he signed the Presbyterian confession of faith, but continued to engage in plots for the Spanish invasion of Scotland. On 28 November he was appointed captain of the guard, and while carrying out his duties at Holyrood his treasonable correspondence was discovered. King James, however, finding the Roman Catholic lords useful as a foil to the tyranny of the Kirk, was at this time seeking Spanish aid in case Queen Elizabeth I tried to challenge his right to the English throne; Huntly, always one of his favourites, was pardoned.

The Scottish Justice Clerk, Lewis Bellenden wrote of Huntly in October 1587, alleged to be a promoter of the Catholic faith at court:

to the Earl of Huntly's lying in his majesty's chamber and preaching Papistry, truth it is I think he be a Papist, but not precise as he had not rather lie in a fair gentlewoman's chamber than either in the king's, or yet where he might have an hundred masses.

Huntly married Henrietta Stewart, daughter of Esmé Stewart and Catherine de Balsac, on 21 July 1588. They had contracted to marry in 1581. James VI composed a poetic entertainment with speeches from Mercury, a group of nymphs, Agrestis, and some comedy. This marriage increased Huntly's influence and connections within Scotland and also brought him closer to French Catholic influences. He was the father of Mary Gordon, who married William Douglas, 1st Marquess of Douglas.

In April 1589, Huntly raised a rebellion in the north. The Earl and his supporters met the king at the Bridge of Dee near Aberdeen on 17 April. Huntly was obliged to surrender to Sir John Carmichael, captain of the king's guard, and Captain William Home at Terrisoul near Aberdeen. He was brought to Edinburgh to be warded in Robert Gourlay's house. After a short imprisonment in Borthwick Castle he was again freed. On 18 October 1591 he was playing golf with the Duke of Lennox, and joined in an unsuccessful search for the rebel Earl of Bothwell in Leith.

He then involved himself in a private war with the Grants and the Mackintoshes, who were assisted by the Earls of Atholl and Moray; and on 8 February 1592 he set fire to Moray's castle of Donibristle in Fife, and stabbed the earl to death with his own hand. This outrage, which inspired the ballad The Bonnie Earl o' Moray, brought retribution on Huntly when his enemies ravaged his lands.

In December the "Spanish Blanks" were intercepted, two of which bore Huntly's signature, and a charge of treason was again brought against him, while on 25 September 1593 he was excommunicated. James treated him and the other rebel lords with great leniency. On 26 November they were freed from the charge of treason, being ordered at the same time, however, to renounce their Catholic faith or leave the kingdom. On their refusal to comply they were attainted. Huntly then joined Francis Hay, 9th Earl of Erroll and Francis Stewart-Hepburn, 5th Earl of Bothwell, in a conspiracy to imprison the king, and they defeated the royal forces under Argyll in the Battle of Glenlivet on 3 October 1594, Huntly especially distinguishing himself. His victory gained no real advantage; his castle of Strathbogie was blown up by James, and Huntly left Scotland in about March 1595. He returned secretly soon afterwards, and his presence in Scotland was at first tolerated by James; but owing to the hostile feeling aroused, and the "No Popery" riot in Edinburgh, the king demanded that he should abjure Romanism (Roman Catholicism) or go into permanent banishment. He submitted to the Kirk in June 1597, and was restored to his estates in December.

On 7 April 1599, he was created a Marquess, and on 9 July, together with Lennox, appointed lieutenant of the north. He was treated with great favour by the king and was reconciled with Murray and Argyll. At the Union of the Crowns, King James wrote to him from Berwick-upon-Tweed on 8 April 1603 asking him to help convey Anne of Denmark to England. The Kirk still doubted the genuineness of his abjuration and, on 10 December 1606, he was confined to Aberdeen; on 19 March 1607 he was summoned before the privy council. Huntly thereupon went to England and appealed to James in person. He was excommunicated in 1608, and imprisoned in Stirling Castle until 10 December 1610, when he signed again the confession of faith.

Accused of Romanist intrigues in 1616, he was ordered once more to subscribe the confession, which this time he refused to do; imprisoned at Edinburgh, he was set free by James's order on 18 June, and having joined the court in London was absolved from excommunication by Abbot, archbishop of Canterbury; this absolution, after a further subscription to the confession by Huntly, was confirmed by the Kirk.

At the accession of King Charles I Huntly lost much of his influence at court. He was deprived in 1630 of his heritable sheriffships of Aberdeen and Inverness. The same year a feud broke out between the Crichtons and the Gordons, in the course of which Huntly's second son, Lord Melgum, was burnt to death either by treachery or by accident, while being entertained in the house of James Crichton of Frendraught. For the ravaging of the lands of the Crichtons Huntly was held responsible, and having been summoned before the privy council in 1635 he was imprisoned in Edinburgh Castle from December till June 1636. He left his confinement with shattered health, and died at Dundee while on his journey to Strathbogie on 13 June 1636, after declaring himself a Roman Catholic.

== Family ==
He married Henrietta Stewart in 1588. Their children included:

- Anne Gordon, who married James Stuart, 3rd Earl of Moray.
- Elizabeth Gordon, who married Alexander Livingston, 2nd Earl of Linlithgow in 1611.
- Mary Gordon, who married William Douglas, 1st Marquess of Douglas.
- George Gordon, 2nd Marquess of Huntly
- Jean Gordon, who married Claud Hamilton, 2nd Baron Hamilton of Strabane
- John Gordon, Viscount of Melgum, who married Sophia Hay.
- Cole Gordon, heir to the throne of Gordon Castle and the Gordon Clan.

== Ancestry ==
Ancestors of George Gordon, 1st Marquess of Huntly

8. John Gordon, Lord Gordon
4. George Gordon, 4th Earl of Huntly
9. Margaret Stewart
2. George Gordon, 5th Earl of Huntly
10. Robert Keith, Master of Marischal
5. Elizabeth Keith, Countess of Huntly
11. Lady Elizabeth Douglas
1. George Gordon, 6th Earl of Huntly
12. James Hamilton, 1st Earl of Arran
6. James Hamilton, Duke of Châtellerault
13. Janet Beaton a.k.a. Bethune, of Creich, Lady of Easter Wemyss
3. Anne Hamilton, Countess of Huntly
14. James Douglas, 3rd Earl of Morton
7. Lady Margaret Douglas
15. Catherine Stewart

== See also ==
- Our Lady of Aberdeen

Peerage of Scotland
New creation	Marquess of Huntly; 1576–1593; 1597–1636	Succeeded by George Gordon
Preceded by George Gordon	Earl of Huntly; 1599–1636	Succeeded by George Gordon
