= Viscount Stuart of Findhorn =

Hereditary title in United Kingdom peerage

Viscount Stuart of Findhorn, of Findhorn in the County of Moray, is a title in the Peerage of the United Kingdom. It was created on 20 November 1959 for the Conservative politician the Hon. James Stuart after his retirement from the House of Commons. Stuart was the third son of Morton Gray Stuart, 17th Earl of Moray (see Earl of Moray for earlier history of the family). The title became extinct on the third Viscount’s death in 2026.

== Viscounts Stuart of Findhorn (1959) ==
- James Gray Stuart, 1st Viscount Stuart of Findhorn (1897–1971)
- David Randolph Moray Stuart, 2nd Viscount Stuart of Findhorn (1924–1999)
- James Dominic Stuart, 3rd Viscount Stuart of Findhorn (1948–2026)

== Family tree ==
Earls of Moray and Viscounts Stuart of Findhorn family tree

Marjorie d. before 1292; Countess of Carrick
Thomas	Martha of Kilconquhar	Robert I ("The Bruce"); 1274–1379; King of Scots
Earl of Moray (1st creation), 1312
Thomas Randolph c. 1285–1332; 1st Earl of Moray	Clan Dunbar	Marjorie Bruce c. 1298–1316 or 1317
Thomas Randolph d. 1332; 2nd Earl of Moray	John Randolph d. 1346; 3rd Earl of Moray	Agnes Randolph of Dunbar c. 1312–1369	Isabel (or Geilis) Randolph	Robert II; 1316–1390; King of Scots
Earldom of Moray (1st creation) extinct and reverted to the Crown, 1346
Earldom of Moray (2nd creation), c. 1374
John Dunbar d. 1391 or 1392; 1st Earl of Moray	Marjorie Stewart	Robert III; 1337–1406; King of Scots
Thomas Dunbar d. c. 1422; 2nd Earl of Moray
Thomas Dunbar; 3rd Earl of Moray	James Dunbar d. c. 1429; 4th Earl of Moray	James I 1394–1437; King of Scots
Archibald Douglas after 1426 – 1455; 6th Earl of Moray	Elizabeth Dunbar d. before 1485/1486; 5th Countess of Moray	George Gordon d. 1501; Earl of Huntly	Annabella of Scotland c. 1433–1509	Janet Dunbar d. c. 1494–1506	James Crichton d. 1454; Lord Crichton, styled Earl of Moray	James II; 1430–1460; King of Scots
Earldom of Moray attainted, 1455
Alexander Gordon d. 1524; Earl of Huntly	Adam Gordon	James III; 1451–1488; King of Scots
Alexander Gordon c. 1505–1530; Master of Sutherland	James IV; 1473–1513; King of Scots
Earl of Moray (4th creation), 1549	Earl of Moray (3rd creation), 1501
George Gordon; 1514–1562; Earl of Huntly; Earl of Moray	John Gordon; 1525–1567; Earl of Sutherland	Elizabeth Campbell	James Stewart c. 1499–1544; Earl of Moray	James V 1512–1542; King of Scots
Earldom of Moray (4th creation) forfeit, 1563	Earl of Moray (3rd creation) extinct, 1544
Lord Doune, 1581	Earl of Moray (5th creation), Lord Abernethy, January 1562; Earl of Mar, February 1562; Lord Strathdearn, 1563
George Gordon d. 1576; Earl of Huntly	James Stewart; 1529–1590; 1st Lord Doune	James Stewart c. 1531–1570; 1st Earl of Moray, etc., Earl of Mar
Earldom of Mar resigned, 1562
George Gordon; 1562–1636; Marquess of Huntly	James Stewart "The Bonnie Earl of Moray" c. 1565–1592; 2nd Earl of Moray, etc. jure uxoris, 2nd Lord Doune	Elizabeth Stuart; 1565–1591; 2nd Countess of Moray, etc.
Lord St Colme, 1620
Anne Gordon; 1590–1640	James Stuart; 1581–1638; 3rd Earl of Moray, etc.
James Stuart c. 1611–1653; 4th Earl of Moray, etc.
Baronet of Rumbelows (Nova Scotia), 1681	Alexander Stuart; 1634–1701; 5th Earl of Moray, etc.
Charles Stuart, Bt. 1673–1735; 6th Earl of Moray, etc.	Francis Stuart; 1673–1739; 7th Earl of Moray, etc.
Baronetage of Rumbleblows extinct, 1735
James Stuart; 1708–1767; 8th Earl of Moray, etc.
Baron Stuart of Castle Stuart in the County of Inverness (Great Britain), 1796
Francis Stuart; 1737–1810; 9th Earl of Moray, etc., 1st Baron Stuart
Francis Stuart; 1771–1848; 10th Earl of Moray, etc., 2nd Baron Stuart	Archibald Stuart
Francis Stuart; 1795–1859; 11th Earl of Moray, etc., 3rd Baron Stuart	John Stuart; 1797–1867; 12th Earl of Moray, etc., 4th Baron Stuart	Archibald George Stuart; 1810–1872; 13th Earl of Moray, etc., 5th Baron Stuart	George Philip Stuart; 1816–1895; 14th Earl of Moray, etc., 6th Baron Stuart	Edmund Luttrell Stuart
Edmund Archibald Stuart; 1840–1901; 15th Earl of Moray, etc., 7th Baron Stuart	Francis James Stuart; 1842–1909; 16th Earl of Moray, etc., 8th Baron Stuart	Morton Gray Stuart; 1855–1930; 17th Earl of Moray, etc., 9th Baron Stuart
Viscount Stuart of Findhorn, 1959
Francis Douglas Stuart; 1892–1943; 18th Earl of Moray, etc., 10th Baron Stuart	Archibald John Morton Stuart; 1894–1974; 19th Earl of Moray, etc., 11th Baron Stuart	James Gray Stuart; 1897–1971; 1st Viscount Stuart of Findhorn
Douglas John Moray Stuart; 1928–2011; 20th Earl of Moray, etc., 12th Baron Stuart	David Randolph Moray Stuart; 1924–1999; 2nd Viscount Stuart of Findhorn
John Douglas Stuart b. 1966; 21st Earl of Moray, etc., 13th Baron Stuart	James Dominic Stuart; 1948–2026; 3rd Viscount Stuart of Findhorn
Viscountcy Stuart of Findhorn extinct, 2026
James Douglas Stuart b. 2002
Heir apparent to the Earldom of Moray and Barony Stuart

== Arms ==
Coat of arms of Viscount Stuart of Findhorn
Crest In a nest Vert a pelican feeding her young Or about her neck a collar engrailed Gules. Escutcheon Quarterly 1st Or a lion rampant within a double tressure flory counterflory Gules all within a bordure compony Azure and Argent (Stuart) 2nd Or a fess chequy Azure and Argent (Stewart of Downe) 3rd Or three cushions within a double tressure flory counterflory Gules (Randolph) 4th Gules a lion rampant within a bordure engrailed Argent (Gray) all within a bordure Or for difference. Supporters Two capercailzie Proper their wings closed. Motto Salus Per Christum Redemptorem

== See also ==
- Earl of Moray
