= Francis Stuart (disambiguation) =

Francis Stuart (1902–2000) was an Irish writer.

Francis Stuart may also refer to:

- Francis Hamilton Stuart, Australian diplomat (1912–2007)
- Francis Stuart, 7th Earl of Moray ( bef. 1683–1739)
- Francis Stuart, 9th Earl of Moray (1737–1810), Earl of Moray
- Francis Stuart, 10th Earl of Moray (1771–1848)
- Francis Stuart, 11th Earl of Moray (1795–1859), Earl of Moray
- Francis Godolphin Osbourne Stuart (c.1843–1923), Scottish photographer
- Frank Stuart (born Francis Stuart) (1844–1910), Australian politician
- Francis Stuart (sailor) (1589–1635), Scottish sailor

== See also ==
- Francis Stewart (disambiguation)
