= Francis Stuart, 10th Earl of Moray =

Scottish noble

The Right Honourable The Earl of Moray KT
- Born: Francis Stuart; 2 February 1771; Fife, Scotland
- Died: 12 January 1848 (aged 76); Darnaway Castle, Forres, Moray, Scotland
- Spouse(s): Lucy Scott (m. 1795; died 1798) Margaret Jane Ainslie (m. 1801; died 1837)
- Parent(s): Francis Stuart, 9th Earl of Moray; Hon. Jean Gray
- Relatives: James Stuart, 8th Earl of Moray (grandfather); John Gray, 11th Lord Gray (grandfather)

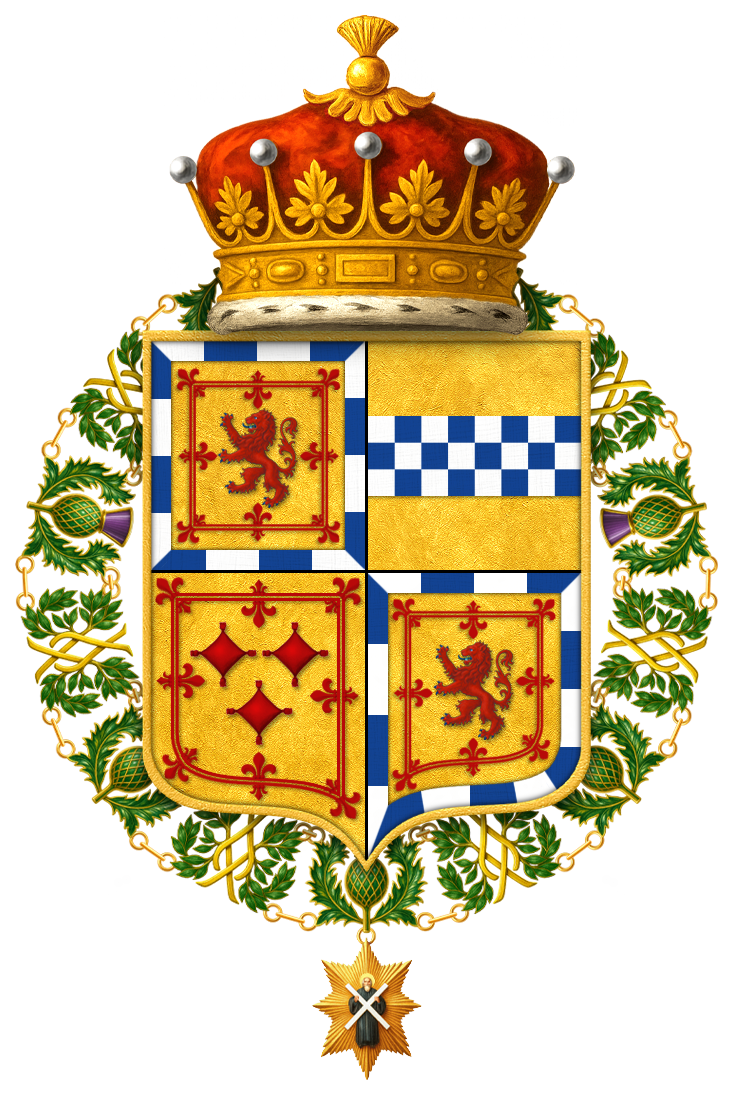
Shield of Arms of Francis Stuart, 10th Earl of Moray, KT

Francis Stuart, 10th Earl of Moray KT (2 February 1771 – 12 January 1848) was a Scottish peer.

== Early life ==
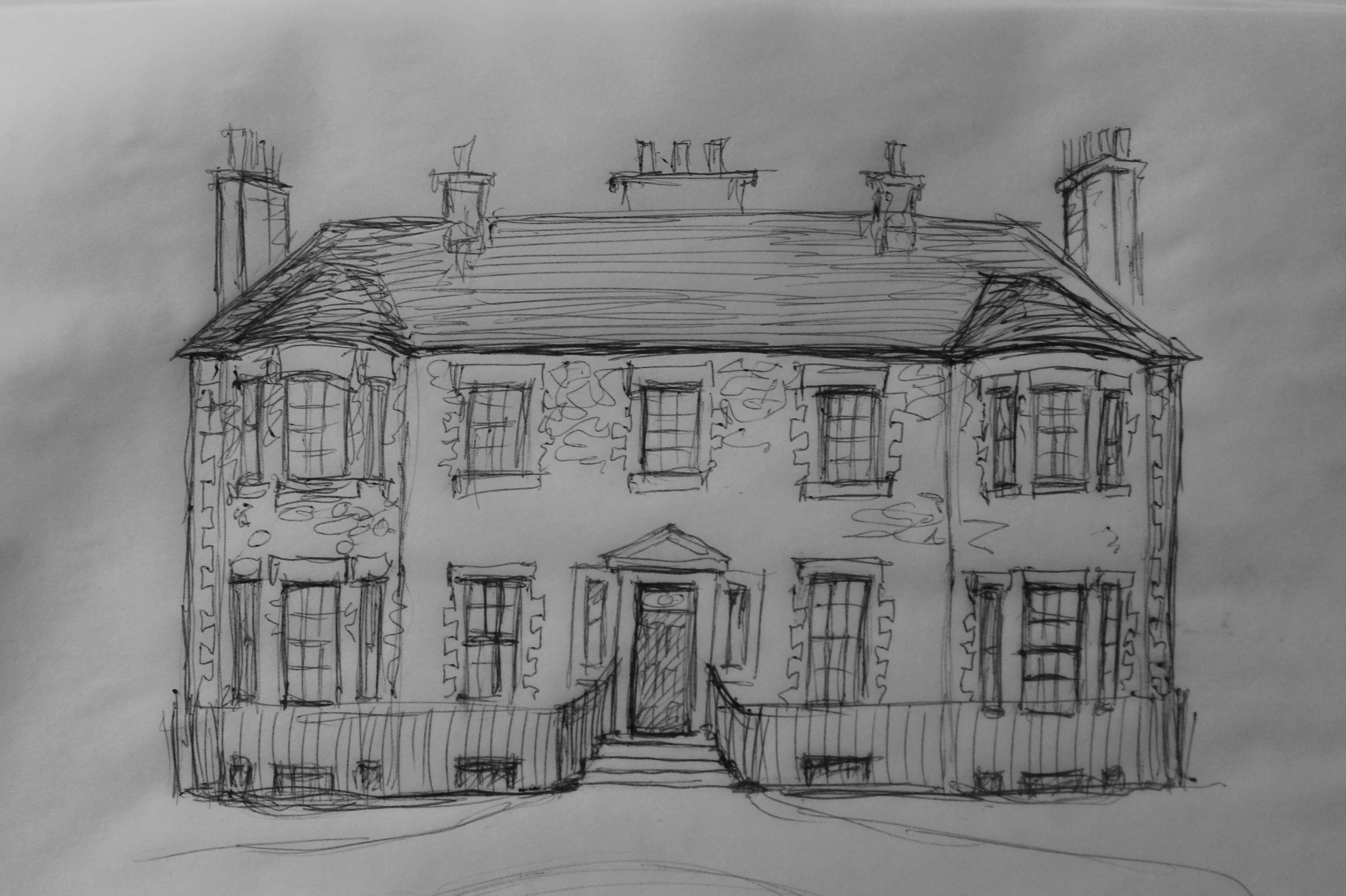
Moray House in west Edinburgh

Francis was born on 2 February 1771 at Fife, Scotland. He was the eldest son of Francis Stuart, 9th Earl of Moray, and the former Hon. Jean Gray. His elder sister, Lady Grace Stuart, married George Douglas of Cavers, and his younger twin brother, Hon. Archibald Stuart, married Cornelia Pleydell (a daughter of Edmund Morton Pleydell). The huge family estate embraced most of Morayshire, embracing towns such as Forres. From around 1785 Moray lived at Moray House in Edinburgh, situated between Charlotte Square and the Water of Leith.

His paternal grandparents were James Stuart, 8th Earl of Moray and, his first wife, Grace Gordon, Countess of Aboyne (née Lockhart, daughter of Sir George Lockhart and former wife of the 3rd Earl of Aboyne). Through his twin brother Archibald, he was an uncle to the Rev. Edmund Luttrell Stuart (father of the 15th, 16th, and 17th Earl of Moray) His maternal grandparents were John Gray, 11th Lord Gray and Margaret Blair (a daughter of Alexander Blair Carnegie, 11th Lord Kinfauns).

== Career ==
Upon the death of his father on 28 August 1810, he succeeded as the 2nd Baron Stuart of Castle Stuart in the Peerage of Great Britain, enabling him to sit in the House of Lords. At the same time, he succeeded as the 8th Lord St Colme, the 10th Earl of Moray, the 10th Lord Abernethy and Strathearn, and the 10th Lord Doune, all in the Peerage of Scotland.

In 1822, he commissioned James Gillespie Graham to lay out an estate of huge townhouses on what was known as the Moray Feu. The development, begun in 1825, is now known as the Moray Estate, and edges Edinburgh's New Town. Street names are all closely linked to the Moray family. It remains as exclusive an address as when it was first built.

He was appointed Knight of the Order of the Thistle in 1827.

== Personal life ==
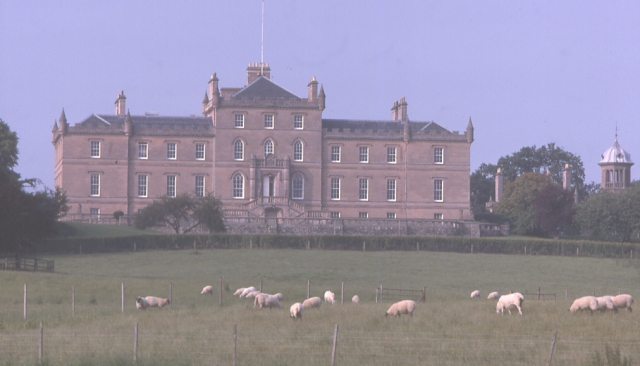
Darnaway Castle

On 26 February 1795, he married Lucy Scott, daughter of Maj.-Gen. John Scott and Hon. Margaret Dundas (a daughter of Robert Dundas Jr.). Before her death in 1798, they were the parents of two children:

- Francis Stuart, 11th Earl of Moray (1795–1859), who was "incurably insane" since his schooldays and never married.
- John Stuart, 12th Earl of Moray (1797–1867), a Captain in the British Army and MP for Newport; he never married.

After Lucy's death, Francis married his cousin, Margaret Jane Ainslie, daughter of Col. Sir Philip Ainslie of Pilton and his maternal aunt, Hon. Elizabeth Gray (a daughter of the 11th Lord Gray) on 7 January 1801 at Edinburgh. Together, they were the parents of:

- Lady Jane Stuart (1802–1880), who married Sir John Drummond-Stewart, 6th Baronet, son of Sir George Stewart, 5th Baronet and Catharine Drummond, in 1832. After his death, she married Capt. Jeremiah Lonsdale Pounden in 1838.
- Hon. James Stuart (1804–1840), a Captain in the 85th Regiment of Light Infantry who predeceased his father.
- Lady Margaret Jane Stuart (1807–1863), who died unmarried.
- Lady Ann Grace Stuart (1809–1873), who died unmarried.
- Archibald George Stuart, 13th Earl of Moray (1810–1872), who never married.
- Hon. Charles Stuart (1812–1847), who predeceased his father.
- Lady Louisa Charlotte Stuart (1813–1864), who died unmarried.
- George Philip Stuart, 14th Earl of Moray (1816–1895), the Deputy Lieutenant of Inverness-shire; he never married.

Lady Moray died at Willoughby House in Cheltenham, on 3 April 1837. Lord Moray died at Darnaway Castle near Forres, Moray, on 12 January 1848. He was, in time, succeeded in the earldom by four of his sons, none of whom married or had children themselves.

Honorary titles
Preceded by The Earl of Moray	Lord Lieutenant of Elginshire; 1810–1848	Succeeded by Sir Alexander Duff
Masonic offices
Preceded by Earl of Ancram	Grand Master of the Grand Lodge of Scotland; 1796–1798	Succeeded by James Stirling
Peerage of Scotland
Preceded by Francis Stuart	Earl of Moray; 1810–1848	Succeeded by Francis Stuart
