= Rocco Di Pietro =

Rocco Di Pietro

Rocco Di Pietro (born 1949) is composer, pianist, author, teacher, and habilitationist whose work crosses multiple disciplinary boundaries. "His work has a literary and visual component linking him with the romantic tradition." He is based in Columbus, Ohio, United States.

== Biography ==
Rocco Di Pietro was born in Buffalo, New York, in 1949. He studied composition and piano with Hans Hagen in Buffalo and at the Berkshire Music Center, Tanglewood, where he won an ASCAP Fellowship to study composition with Lukas Foss and Bruno Maderna. While at Berskire, Gunther Schuller performed Di Pietro's Drafts (1971) with the Berkshire Music Center ensemble. Di Pietro's teacher Bruno Maderna commissioned the work Piece for Bruno (1974) for the Nancy Meehan Dance company, which was conducted by Dennis Russell Davies with the St. Paul Chamber Orchestra at the American Dance Festival in New London, Connecticut, 1974.

Di Pietro worked exclusively in musical composition for 20 years before earning degrees from SUNY Buffalo and Vermont College. He combined his musical and academic experience as an interdisciplinary professor teaching in prisons and at colleges in New York, Ohio, and California. He toured California prisons as an artist-in-residence. In 1988, Di Pietro finished his first book, A New Peasant Consciousness: Menocchio The Precursor. Presented to Vermont College as his thesis, he was granted a Master of Arts in Music and Social History. The book also included the musical works Etudes for Menocchio and Annales For Menocchio, and ultimately served as the basis for an interdisciplinary work combining opera, film, lecture, slides, and music.

Di Pietro taught the historiography of Annales in prisons throughout New York, Ohio, and California as a guest of the William James Association. From there, he expanded his research and teaching to courses in sociology, anthropology, abnormal psychology, critical theory, philosophy, musicology, and art theory. One current ran throughout his scholarship and teaching: examining the subject in terms of its relationship to power. At the end of this 11-year period, he returned to music, with literature a primary influence. His work in prisons led to an Ohio Arts Council grant to attend What Next, a conference in San Francisco on the state of United States prisons. In 1995, he was named artist in residence at the Headlands Center, California.

While teaching in prison, Di Pietro published highlights of five years of his conversations (1996–2000) with noted composer Pierre Boulez in the book Dialogues with Boulez, (Scarecrow Press, 2001). His main question for the maestro: where did the new music of the mid-20th century go? Gramaphone said of the book: "You can admire Di Pietro for his persistence in persuading Boulez to participate in these exchanges, and for provoking a number of reasonably stimulating comments, not least about his continuing desire to write an opera." Upon publishing the book, Di Pietro presented it to IRCAM in Paris, France, and was invited to speak about the book by Mills College and Stanford University. He also attended the Stockhausen Summer Course for Music in Kürten, Germany. His essay Musician Without Notes, based on his experiences in Kürten, found the composer re-assessing his relationship to composition.

When I hear the works of young composers successful enough to have
performances, recordings and musical jobs, I'm no longer envious. Something
has happened to me. Without doubt I too once wanted what those
successful young composers have, but now I see the kind of music
that comes out of that particular kind of insulation. Let's call
it the insulation of success."

Di Pietro's third book, The Normal Exception: Life Stories, Reflections and Dreams From Prison, was the result of his work in prisons. Teaching prisoners inspired the Prison Dirges cycle, works based on the firsthand accounts of prisoners in the penal system. Dirges has been presented a variety of venues: from Alcatraz Island to Roulette Intermedium, New York.

After years of prison work, Di Pietro divided his time between social work and teaching humanities at Columbus State Community College. In addition to humanities courses taught a sequence of electronic music courses and founded an annual electronic music festival to give his students a chance to present their work. In 2004, he released a CD retrospective of his works called Multiples and The Lost Project. The Lost Project, based on the plight of missing children, employed the musical monogram techniques developed by Johann Sebastian Bach. Di Pietro took on the role of a "social composer," and attempted to connect his time spent as a social work and his music. Work in this area led to grants from the Puffin Foundation. The Lost Project is presented in traditional settings (Dartmouth College and Stanford University) as well as the less-traditional (street corners, churches, and community festivals).

Next, he gathered essays for his fourth book, Musician Without Notes, and began work on another large interdisciplinary cycle, The Comedy Of The Real (2003–2009), a series of radio dramas in the form of "positions" emanating outward in a spiral. The Third Position was broadcast on radio stations in New York, Helsinki, and Amsterdam. The CD of the work was released in 2006. Comedy references Dante's Divine Comedy, Balzac's La Comédie humaine, and the consciousness studies of Julian Jaynes. The work focuses on creating something transgressive within post-modernism along with simulation, the hyper-real, and investigating body traps and entrainment processes in trance experience. The work continued with texts for fourth, fifth, and sixth positions. Also during this time, Di Pietro completed the works Rhizome for Evelyn Glennie for percussion, electronics, and stone instruments; and a new series of Chiaroscuros. The composer's goal is to demonstrate that music is a contestation in “counteracting human alienation in a world of utility.”

In early 2009, Di Pietro was the SICA (Stanford Institute for The Creative Arts) Composer in Residence. While in residency, Di Pietro worked on several projects including Body Trap for the Wired Sound ensemble with Chris Chafe, Pauline Oliveros, and Chryssie Nanou; a new section of his ongoing cycle, The Comedy of the Real for Ge Wang and the Stanford Laptop Orchestra; and work on his orchestral piece Finale which received its official premiere at Stanford under the direction of Jindong Cai, conductor of the Shanghai Orchestra in China, in May 2012. As a guest composer he led graduate composition seminars, provided private lessons, and consulted with composition students. Di Pietro was awarded a grant by the Ohio Arts Council in the 2012 Individual Excellence Awards program for his compositions Italian Rajas with Odalisques and Caravaggio-Chiaroscuro II.

Di Pietro's current project is a five movement symphony called The Art of Imaginal Listening. He is working with community orchestras, and in particular, the Greater Columbus Community Orchestra conducted by Olev Viro. The second movement of the symphony called The Dome was written for the cellist Luis Biava and Olev Viro. The third movement of this symphony is Prayer, also written for Biava and Viro, and dedicated to José Antonio Abreu and the youth orchestras of El Sistema.

== Works ==
- Drafts (1971) for chamber ensemble
- Acoustic Poems (1972) for piano
- Etudes for the Youths Magic Horn (1975–76) for chorus and chamber orchestra; commissioned by Lukas Foss and conducted by Lukas Foss and the Brooklyn Philharmonic at the Cooper Union, New York. The New York Times described it as "a rough-hewn aggregate of distinct events, pieced together, block by block, in deliberately constructivist fashion."
- Melodia Della Terra (1976) for solo violin
- Piece for Danilo Dolci (1976) for clarinet, string orchestra; conducted by Leonard Holvik and the Earlham College Chorus and orchestra at Carnegie Recital Hall, 1977
- Aria Grande (1980–81) for violin and wind orchestra; commissioned by Christiane Edinger and the Bavarian Radio Orchestra; premiered by Cristobal Halffter Herkulessal der Residenz, Munich, Germany, 1983
- Homemade Aria (1978) for chamber orchestra; commissioned by Julius Eastman CETA Program; premiered by Eastman and the CETA Orchestra at the Kitchen, New York, 1978
- Una Macchinetta Infernale (1978) for cello, piano; and magnetic tape; and premiered by Frances Marie Uitti and Yvar Mikhashoff at the American Academy in Rome, Italy, 1980
- Punto Vivo (1979) for chamber orchestra; premiered by Lukas Foss and the Sequoia String Quartet and ensemble ‘Sonor’ at the OJAI Festival, Ojai, California, 1980
- Aria for Piano (1978), performed at the Darmstadt Ferien Kurse Für Neue Musik, Darmstadt, Germany, 1978,
- Melodia Assoluta (1978-1980) for solo cello; premiered by Frances Marie Uitti at the Conservatorio San Resertorio, Naples, Italy, 1980
- Melodia Arcana (1980–1983) for mallet percussion and tape; premiered by Anthony Miranda at the Composers Forum Concert, New York City, 1987; European premiere at the American School in Paris, France, 1988
- Melodia Nera (1980–82) for timpani premiered at the Jetske Conservatory, Denmark, and recorded for Danish radio, 1981
- Donizetti in Buffalo from Two Orchestral Portraits (1978) for baritone voice and chamber orchestra to a text by Hart Crane, commissioned by Julius Eastman
- Overture (1980–81) for orchestra of 100 percussion instruments, premiered by Jan Williams and the University of Buffalo Percussion Ensemble
- Bel Canto Duo (1980–81) for violin and piano; commissioned by Christiane Edinger and Gerhard Pulchelt; premiered for Bavarian Radio, Munich, Germany, 1981
- Phantom Melos (1981) for saxophone quartet; commissioned by Russell Link; for saxophone quartet; premiered by the Amherst Saxophone Quartet at the Buffalo Academy for the Visual and Performing Arts, Buffalo, New York 1982
- Legende for the 13 of November (1982) for piano trio; premiered by the Seoul Contemporary Music Ensemble at the National Theater, Seoul, South Korea, 1986
- Three Popular Songs (1984) for voice, piano and percussion
- Paragone (1985) for solo guitar
- Annales Sans Condition; Solo for Homeless Percussionist (1987)
- Three Black American Folk Songs (1987) for voice, saxophone, piano and tape; performed by Pam Smith and the Bang on a Can All-Stars, at the Bang on a Can Festival, New York, 1992
- Homemade Aria with Black Melody (1991) for timpani and chamber orchestra; performed by the Pro Musica Chamber Orchestra at Ohio State University, Columbus, Ohio, 1993, after receiving a Greater Columbus Arts Council grant'
- Prison Dirges model version B- (1993–95) for life stories, accordion, and tape
- A Network of Radiation (1995) for speaker, accordion, and boom-boxes; commissioned by the Headlands Center
- 46 Injured Birds (1995) for magnetic tape, premiered on Alcatraz Island with Richard Kamler’s A Table of Voices exhibit, 1996
- Wind Swept Centering and Faust/from Multiples Piano Pieces (1995) for piano
- Deconstructed Fountain From Ravel With Derrida Watching (1996) for piano and tape; premiered at the Bellingham Electro-Acoustic Festival, Bellingham, Washington, 2006
- Prison Dirges (1996)
- "Etudes for Crippled Hands" (1999) for piano
- Tears of Eros (2000)
- Tears of Eros / Torso Version B / Multiple (2001) for piano and magnetic tape
- Chamber Orchestra Lost (2002); premiered by the Stanford University Ensemble at Stanford University, California, 2003
- Mobile Phone Dream B with Lost (2002) for piano, celletto and electronics
- Wave Fugue with Electronic Lost (2003) for piano and digital electro-acoustic sound
- Later (2004) for guitar and electronics; premiered at the Los Angeles Sonic Odyssey, April 2006
- The Third Position from the Comedy of the Real Cycle (2004), radio drama for speaker, instruments, and electro-acoustic sound; broadcast by Art@radio Baltimore, New York, Helsinki, and Amsterdam, 2005
- Chamber Prison Dirges/Multiple (2005) for chamber ensemble
- Solo Lost 5 with Electric Shadows (2003) for bass flute, candles and fixed media; premiered by Robert Dick at Roulette Experimental Inter-media, New York, 2007
- A Turning With Frames For Pauline Oliveros, from the Comedy of the Real (2003–2006) for multiple instruments, electronic sounds and text by Jean Francois Lyotard; premiered at Roulette Experimental Intermedium, New York, 2007
- Three Studies for a Finale (Katrina Youth-hand bell monograms) (2005) for hand bells, accordion, electric guitar, voice, and electronics
- Post Cards From the Impossible (In memoriam Justin Isom) (2006) for reciter, guitar, and hand instruments
- Harmonic Injured Bird/Multiple (2006) for piano, life stories, and tape
- Caprices for Goya (2007) for piano four hands and tape; premiered by Kathy Supove and Di Pietro at Roulette Experimental Inter-medium, New York City, May 2007
- Lamps from Look (Modified Crippled Hands - Andante) (2007) for piano, lap steel guitar, and synthesizer
- Rhizome For Evelyn Glennie (2007–2010)
- Rajas Finale (2010)
- Message to Julius Eastman (2015) for solo piano

== Discography ==
- Multiples/The Lost Project
- The Third Position

== Awards ==
- Ohio Arts Council Individual Excellence Award (2012)
- Headlands Center for the Arts Fellowship (1995)
- The MacDowell Colony Fellowship (1989)
- Puffin Foundation (1989)
- Meet the Composer Grants (1983–85)
- American Dance Foundation (1974)

== Archives ==
- State University of New York at Buffalo, Baird Music Hall Library, Amherst NY
- American Music Center-New York, NY
- Darmstadt Ferienkurse Fur Neue Musik- Library, Darmstadt, Germany
- Mid American Center for Contemporary Music, Bowling Green, OH.
- Electro-Acoustic Society of Great Britain, London, England State University of New York at Buffalo, Baird Music Hall Library, Amherst NY
