= Frank Stewart (disambiguation) =

Frank Stewart (1923–1979) was an Australian politician.

Frank Stewart may also refer to:

- Frank Stewart (poet) (born 1946), American poet
- Dutch Savage (Frank Stewart, 1935–2013), American wrestler
- Frank Stewart (1920s pitcher) (1906–2001), American pitcher
- Frank Stewart (1930s pitcher), American baseball player
- Frank Stewart (Australian footballer) (1910–1986), Australian rules footballer
- Frank Stewart (artist), African-American photographer
- W. Frank Stewart, silver miner and Nevada state senator from 1876 to 1880
- Frank Stewart, American entrepreneur, founder of Stewart's Restaurants

== See also ==
- Francis Stewart (disambiguation)
- Frank H. Stewart House, Newton, Massachusetts
- Frank Stuart (1844–1910), Australian politician
- Stewart (name)
