= Earl of Moray =

Scottish noble title

Earldom of Moray
- Quarterly: 1st & 4th, Or a lion rampant within a double tressure flory counterflory gules (Royal arms of Scotland) surrounded with a bordure compony argent and azure (Moray); 2nd, Or a fess chequy azure and argent (Stewart of Doune); 3rd, Or three cushions within a double tressure flory counterflory gules (Randolph)
- Creation date: 30 January 1562 (Fifth creation)
- Created by: Mary, Queen of Scots (Fifth creation)
- Peerage: Peerage of Scotland
- First holder: James Stewart, 1st Earl of Moray (Fifth creation)
- Present holder: John Douglas Stuart, 21st Earl of Moray
- Heir apparent: James Stuart, Lord Doune
- Remainder to: Heirs male of the 1st earl's body
- Subsidiary titles: Lord Abernethy; Lord Strathdearn; Lord Doune; Lord St Colme; Baron Stuart of Castle Stuart
- Status: Extant
- Seats: Doune Park; Darnaway Castle
- Former seats: Castle Stuart; Doune Castle
- Motto: Salus per Christum redemptorem ("Salvation through Christ the Redeemer")

Arms of Randolph, Earls of Moray

The title Earl of Moray, or Mormaer of Moray (pronounced "Murry"), was originally held by the rulers of the Province of Moray, which existed from the 10th century with varying degrees of independence from the Kingdom of Alba to the south. Until 1130 the status of Moray's rulers was ambiguous and they were described in some sources as "mormaers" (the Gaelic term for "Earl"), in others as "Kings of Moray", and in others as "Kings of Alba". The position was suppressed by David I of Scotland some time after his defeat of Óengus of Moray at the Battle of Stracathro in 1130, but was recreated as a feudal earldom by Robert the Bruce and granted to Thomas Randolph, 1st Earl of Moray in 1312.

The title has subsequently been created several times in the Peerage of Scotland. It has been held by Clan Stewart since the 16th century, when James Stewart, illegitimate son of James V, was granted the title.

== History of the Earldom of Moray ==
The province of Moray's importance as part of the kingdom of Scotland was demonstrated during the years of major warfare between 1296 and 1340. The province was relatively untouched by direct fighting and Royal-led English armies penetrated Moray on only three occasions in 1296, 1303 and 1335, and significant English occupation occurred only in 1296–97. This security meant that it was a vital refuge and recruitment ground for the Scottish guardians between 1297 and 1303, and provided Robert I of Scotland with a base and allies during his northern campaign against the Comyns and their allies in 1307–08. The province was forced to submit to Edward I of England in 1303 and Robert I of Scotland therefore clearly recognized the significance of Moray for the security of his realm. In 1312 Robert I re-established the Earldom of Moray for his nephew, Thomas Randolph, 1st Earl of Moray. The new earldom included all of the old province and the crown lands of the Laich or coastal area of Moray.

Thomas's son John Randolph was killed in 1346, leaving no heir and the other noble families including the Comyns, Strathbogies and Morays had all disappeared from or left the province by between 1300 and 1350. With the absence of noble leaders, power fell to lesser figures who functioned in kin-based groups such as the Clan Donnachaidh of Atholl and the Chattan Confederation, which centred on Badenoch. This drew in lords and men from outside of the province, from further south such as the Dunbars and Stewarts who staked their claims. In 1372, the Earldom of Moray was divided between them with John Dunbar receiving the coastal districts and Alexander Stewart, favourite son of Robert II of Scotland being made lord of Badenoch in the uplands.

The division of Moray led to local conflict that was exacerbated by the activities of local kindreds and the eastward spread of the Gaelic superpower, the Lord of the Isles. The activities of the islesmen and kindreds in the service of Alexander Stewart made Moray the area of greatest conflict between the revived power of Gaelic Scotland and the structured society under the crown established during the previous centuries. Churchmen and burgesses made repeated complaints about the attacks of raiding caterans, the most notable being the burning of Elgin Cathedral by Alexander Stewart, Earl of Buchan, also known as the Wolf of Badenoch, in a dispute with the Bishop of Moray.

Scotland's rulers were slow to react to the problems in the earldom of Moray. Their response was largely indirect and the governor, Robert Stewart, Duke of Albany, campaigned in the region in 1405 and 1411. James I of Scotland did the same in 1428 and 1429. They preferred to rely on a Lieutenant, Alexander Stewart, Earl of Mar, the son of the Wolf of Badenoch. When the Earl of Mar died in 1435, a power vacuum allowed the Lords of the Isles to dominate Moray from the 1430s to the 1450s. The crown's earldom was restricted to the coastal areas of Moray and was held by lords whose resources lay elsewhere. The last of these once-loyal lords were the Clan Douglas, Earls of Douglas who were forfeited in 1455, after the Battle of Arkinholm against the king and a new power emerged in the province. The Clan Gordon, Earls of Huntly secured Badenoch in 1452 and occupied Moray three years later. The crown refused to allow the Gordons the provincial dominance of the Randolphs, but they remained chief lords of the area from the 15th century onwards, but under the possession of the crown royal line.

The earldom eventually descended to Elizabeth Stewart, 5th Countess of Moray, whose husband was also recognised as earl. However, when her husband, James, was killed in battle against the Sovereign in 1455, his title was attainted.

The next grant was made to James Stewart, the son of King James IV. He, however, died without children, and the title became extinct. The title was next given to George Gordon, 4th Earl of Huntly. Gordon fell out of royal favour, and in 1462, he was killed and his title forfeited.

The most recent creation was in favour of another James Stewart, the illegitimate son of King James V. Other Scottish titles associated with this creation are: Lord Abernethy and Strathearn (created 1562), Lord Doune (1581) and Lord St Colme (1611). Furthermore, Lord Moray holds the title Baron Stuart (1796), of Castle Stuart in the County of Inverness; since it is in the Peerage of Great Britain, it entitled the Earls of Moray to sit in the House of Lords before the passage of the Peerage Act 1963.

Perhaps the most well-known Earl of Moray was James Stewart, 2nd Earl of Moray, the husband of Elizabeth Stewart, 2nd Countess of Moray, who held the earldom jure uxoris (by right of his wife), as he was the subject of a famous ballad, "The Bonny Earl O'Moray". He was also a direct male-line descendant of King Robert II.

The family seats are Doune Lodge, near Doune, Stirling and Darnaway Castle, near Forres, Moray.

== Mormaers of Moray ==
- Findláech mac Ruaidrí (before 1014–1020)
- Máel Coluim mac Maíl Brigti (1020–1029)
- Gille Coemgáin mac Maíl Brigti (1029–1032)
- Mac Bethad mac Findláich, (Macbeth, King of Scotland) (1032–1057)
- Lulach mac Gille Coemgáin (1057–1058)
- Máel Snechtai mac Lulaich (1058–1078/1085)
- ?
- Óengus (?–1130)
- ? William fitz Duncan (1130s–1147)
  - To Scottish Crown

== Earls of Moray, first creation (1312) ==
- Thomas Randolph, 1st Earl of Moray (d. 1332)
- Thomas Randolph, 2nd Earl of Moray (d. 1332)
- John Randolph, 3rd Earl of Moray (d. 1346)

== Earls of Moray, second creation (1372) ==
- John Dunbar, 1st Earl of Moray (d. 1391)
- Thomas Dunbar, 2nd Earl of Moray (d. 1422?), son of 1st Earl
- Thomas Dunbar, 3rd Earl of Moray (d. ?), son of 2nd Earl
- James Dunbar, 4th Earl of Moray (d. 1429), cousin of 3rd Earl
- Elizabeth Dunbar, Countess of Moray (d. 1485) (forfeit 1455), daughter of 4th Earl
  - Archibald Douglas, Earl of Moray (d. 1455), brother of the 8th and 9th Earls of Douglas (acceded 145?), husband of Elizabeth Dunbar
  - James Crichton, 2nd Lord Crichton and Earl of Moray (d. 1454) (acceded 1452), the husband of Janet Dunbar (sister of Elizabeth Dunbar)

== Earls of Moray, third creation (1501) ==
- James Stewart, Earl of Moray (c. 1499–1544)

== Earls of Moray, fourth creation (1549) ==
- George Gordon, 4th Earl of Huntly, Earl of Moray (1514–1562), title forfeited

== Earls of Moray, fifth creation (1562) ==
- James Stewart, 1st Earl of Moray (c. 1531–1570)
- Elizabeth Stuart, 2nd Countess of Moray (d. 1591)
- James Stewart, jure uxoris 2nd Earl of Moray (d. 1592)
- James Stuart, 3rd Earl of Moray (d. 1638)
- James Stuart, 4th Earl of Moray (d. 1653)
- Alexander Stuart, 5th Earl of Moray (d. 1701)
- Charles Stuart, 6th Earl of Moray (d. 1735)
- Francis Stuart, 7th Earl of Moray (d. 1739)
- James Stuart, 8th Earl of Moray (1708–1767)
- Francis Stuart, 9th Earl of Moray (1737–1810)
- Francis Stuart, 10th Earl of Moray (1771–1848)
- Francis Stuart, 11th Earl of Moray (1795–1859)
- John Stuart, 12th Earl of Moray (1797–1867)
- Archibald George Stuart, 13th Earl of Moray (1810–1872)
- George Philip Stuart, 14th Earl of Moray (1816–1895)
- Edmund Archibald Stuart, 15th Earl of Moray (1840–1901)
- Francis James Stuart, 16th Earl of Moray (1842–1909)
- Morton Gray Stuart, 17th Earl of Moray (1855–1930)
- Francis Douglas Stuart, 18th Earl of Moray (1892–1943)
- Archibald John Morton Stuart, 19th Earl of Moray (1894–1974)
- Douglas John Moray Stuart, 20th Earl of Moray (1928–2011)
- John Douglas Stuart, 21st Earl of Moray (b. 1966)

== Family tree ==
Earls of Moray and Viscounts Stuart of Findhorn family tree

Marjorie d. before 1292; Countess of Carrick
Thomas	Martha of Kilconquhar	Robert I ("The Bruce"); 1274–1379; King of Scots
Earl of Moray (1st creation), 1312
Thomas Randolph c. 1285–1332; 1st Earl of Moray	Clan Dunbar	Marjorie Bruce c. 1298–1316 or 1317
Thomas Randolph d. 1332; 2nd Earl of Moray	John Randolph d. 1346; 3rd Earl of Moray	Agnes Randolph of Dunbar c. 1312–1369	Isabel (or Geilis) Randolph	Robert II; 1316–1390; King of Scots
Earldom of Moray (1st creation) extinct and reverted to the Crown, 1346
Earldom of Moray (2nd creation), c. 1374
John Dunbar d. 1391 or 1392; 1st Earl of Moray	Marjorie Stewart	Robert III; 1337–1406; King of Scots
Thomas Dunbar d. c. 1422; 2nd Earl of Moray
Thomas Dunbar; 3rd Earl of Moray	James Dunbar d. c. 1429; 4th Earl of Moray	James I 1394–1437; King of Scots
Archibald Douglas after 1426 – 1455; 6th Earl of Moray	Elizabeth Dunbar d. before 1485/1486; 5th Countess of Moray	George Gordon d. 1501; Earl of Huntly	Annabella of Scotland c. 1433–1509	Janet Dunbar d. c. 1494–1506	James Crichton d. 1454; Lord Crichton, styled Earl of Moray	James II; 1430–1460; King of Scots
Earldom of Moray attainted, 1455
Alexander Gordon d. 1524; Earl of Huntly	Adam Gordon	James III; 1451–1488; King of Scots
Alexander Gordon c. 1505–1530; Master of Sutherland	James IV; 1473–1513; King of Scots
Earl of Moray (4th creation), 1549	Earl of Moray (3rd creation), 1501
George Gordon; 1514–1562; Earl of Huntly; Earl of Moray	John Gordon; 1525–1567; Earl of Sutherland	Elizabeth Campbell	James Stewart c. 1499–1544; Earl of Moray	James V 1512–1542; King of Scots
Earldom of Moray (4th creation) forfeit, 1563	Earl of Moray (3rd creation) extinct, 1544
Lord Doune, 1581	Earl of Moray (5th creation), Lord Abernethy, January 1562; Earl of Mar, February 1562; Lord Strathdearn, 1563
George Gordon d. 1576; Earl of Huntly	James Stewart; 1529–1590; 1st Lord Doune	James Stewart c. 1531–1570; 1st Earl of Moray, etc., Earl of Mar
Earldom of Mar resigned, 1562
George Gordon; 1562–1636; Marquess of Huntly	James Stewart "The Bonnie Earl of Moray" c. 1565–1592; 2nd Earl of Moray, etc. jure uxoris, 2nd Lord Doune	Elizabeth Stuart; 1565–1591; 2nd Countess of Moray, etc.
Lord St Colme, 1620
Anne Gordon; 1590–1640	James Stuart; 1581–1638; 3rd Earl of Moray, etc.
James Stuart c. 1611–1653; 4th Earl of Moray, etc.
Baronet of Rumbelows (Nova Scotia), 1681	Alexander Stuart; 1634–1701; 5th Earl of Moray, etc.
Charles Stuart, Bt. 1673–1735; 6th Earl of Moray, etc.	Francis Stuart; 1673–1739; 7th Earl of Moray, etc.
Baronetage of Rumbleblows extinct, 1735
James Stuart; 1708–1767; 8th Earl of Moray, etc.
Baron Stuart of Castle Stuart in the County of Inverness (Great Britain), 1796
Francis Stuart; 1737–1810; 9th Earl of Moray, etc., 1st Baron Stuart
Francis Stuart; 1771–1848; 10th Earl of Moray, etc., 2nd Baron Stuart	Archibald Stuart
Francis Stuart; 1795–1859; 11th Earl of Moray, etc., 3rd Baron Stuart	John Stuart; 1797–1867; 12th Earl of Moray, etc., 4th Baron Stuart	Archibald George Stuart; 1810–1872; 13th Earl of Moray, etc., 5th Baron Stuart	George Philip Stuart; 1816–1895; 14th Earl of Moray, etc., 6th Baron Stuart	Edmund Luttrell Stuart
Edmund Archibald Stuart; 1840–1901; 15th Earl of Moray, etc., 7th Baron Stuart	Francis James Stuart; 1842–1909; 16th Earl of Moray, etc., 8th Baron Stuart	Morton Gray Stuart; 1855–1930; 17th Earl of Moray, etc., 9th Baron Stuart
Viscount Stuart of Findhorn, 1959
Francis Douglas Stuart; 1892–1943; 18th Earl of Moray, etc., 10th Baron Stuart	Archibald John Morton Stuart; 1894–1974; 19th Earl of Moray, etc., 11th Baron Stuart	James Gray Stuart; 1897–1971; 1st Viscount Stuart of Findhorn
Douglas John Moray Stuart; 1928–2011; 20th Earl of Moray, etc., 12th Baron Stuart	David Randolph Moray Stuart; 1924–1999; 2nd Viscount Stuart of Findhorn
John Douglas Stuart b. 1966; 21st Earl of Moray, etc., 13th Baron Stuart	James Dominic Stuart; 1948–2026; 3rd Viscount Stuart of Findhorn
Viscountcy Stuart of Findhorn extinct, 2026
James Douglas Stuart b. 2002
Heir apparent to the Earldom of Moray and Barony Stuart

== Present peer ==
John Douglas Stuart, 21st Earl of Moray (born 29 August 1966) is the only son of the 20th Earl of Moray and Lady Malvina Dorothea Murray, elder daughter of Mungo Murray, 7th Earl of Mansfield. Known as Lord Doune between 1974 and 2011, he was educated at Loretto School and University College London, graduating BA in History of Art. In 2003 he lived at Doune Park, Perthshire. On 23 September 2011 he succeeded to the peerages of his father.

On 1 July 2000, he married Catherine Jane Lawson, daughter of Professor Wilfred Alan Lawson, of Cloncallow, County Wicklow, and they have three sons. The heir apparent to the titles is the eldest son, James Douglas Stuart, Lord Doune (b. 2002).

== See also ==
- Viscount Stuart of Findhorn
- Clan Stewart
- Doune Castle
- Castle Stuart
- Mondegreen
