= Francis Stewart (disambiguation) =

Francis Stewart 5th Earl of Bothwell.

Francis Stewart may also refer to:

- Frank Stewart (Francis Stewart, 1923–1979), Australian politician
- Francis Stewart, but for the attainder 2nd (or 6th) Earl of Bothwell (c. 1584–1640)
- Captain Francis Stewart of Coldingham (died c.1683), cavalry officer who was heir to Earldom of Bothwell

== See also ==
- Frank Stewart (disambiguation)
- Frances Stewart (disambiguation)
- Francis Stuart (disambiguation)
