= Cultural depictions of Robert II of Scotland =

Robert II of Scotland has been depicted in historical novels. They include:

- The Three Perils of Man; or, War, women, and witchcraft (1822) by James Hogg. The tale takes place in the reign of Robert II whose "country enjoyed happiness and peace, all save a part adjoining to the borders of England." Part of the action takes place at Linlithgow Palace, where Robert promises to marry his daughter Margaret Stewart "to the knight who shall take that castle of Roxburgh out of the hands of the English". With Margaret adding her own terms, that "in case of his attempting and failing in the undertaking, he shall forfeit all his lands, castles, towns, and towers to me." In the absence of volunteers, Margaret vows to take the Castle herself, defeating Lord Musgrave and his mistress Jane Howard.
- The Lords of Misrule (1976) by Nigel Tranter. Covers events from c. 1388 to 1390. Depicting the last years of Robert II and the rise of Robert III of Scotland to the throne. As the elderly king has grown "feeble, weary and half-blind", his sons, daughters and other nobles campaign for power. An ungoverned Scotland is ravaged by their conflicts. Robert Stewart, Duke of Albany and Alexander Stewart, Earl of Buchan are prominently featured.
- Courting Favour (2000) by Nigel Tranter. Follows the career of John Dunbar, Earl of Moray in the courts of David II of Scotland and Robert II. John is a son-in-law to the latter and serves him as a diplomat.
