= Francis Stuart, 9th Earl of Moray =

Scottish noble

The Right Honourable The Earl of Moray
- Born: Francis Stuart; 11 January 1737
- Died: 28 August 1810 (aged 73)
- Spouse: Hon. Jean Gray (m. 1763; died 1786)
- Children: Lady Grace Douglas; Francis Stuart, 10th Earl of Moray; Hon. Archibald Stuart
- Parent(s): James Stuart, 8th Earl of Moray; Grace Gordon, Countess of Aboyne
- Relatives: Charles Gordon, 4th Earl of Aboyne (half-brother); Francis Stuart, 7th Earl of Moray (grandfather); Sir George Lockhart (grandfather)

Francis Stuart, 9th Earl of Moray (11 January 1737 – 28 August 1810) was a Scottish nobleman.

== Early life ==
Stuart was born on 11 January 1737. He was the eldest son of James Stuart, 8th Earl of Moray and, his first wife, Grace (née Lockhart) Gordon, Countess of Aboyne (1706–1738). From his mother's first marriage to the 3rd Earl of Aboyne, he had three elder half-brothers, Charles Gordon, 4th Earl of Aboyne, Lt.-Col. Hon. John Gordon of Glentanner, and Lt.-Col. Hon. Lockhart Gordon. From his parents marriage, he had one sister, Lady Euphemia Stuart. After his mother's death in 1738, his father remarried to Lady Margaret Wemyss, eldest daughter of the 4th Earl of Wemyss. From his father's second marriage, he had two younger half-brothers, Lt.-Col. James Stuart, and Lt. David Stuart.

His paternal grandparents were Francis Stuart, 7th Earl of Moray and Jean Elphinstone (a daughter of John Elphinstone, 4th Lord Balmerino). His maternal grandparents were Sir George Lockhart of Carnwath and Lady Euphemia Montgomerie (a daughter of the 9th Earl of Eglington).

== Career ==
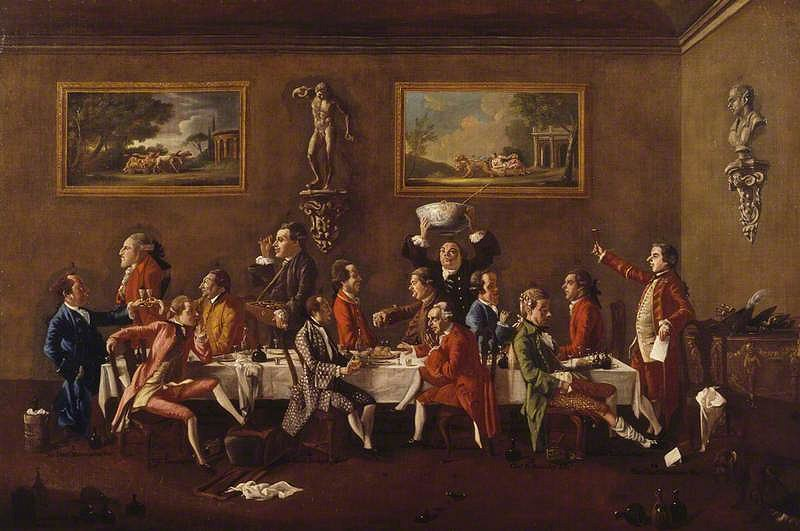
A Punch Party in Florence, by Thomas Patch, 1760; Stuart is depicted in the painting as the ninth person

In 1755, his father purchased his grandmother's family estate, Balmerino House in Leith, from the Crown who had confiscated the house due to Lord Balmerino's active support of the Jacobite Rebellion. Shortly before Francis acceded to his titles in 1767, his father sold it to Lady Baird of Newbyth, in 1762.

Upon his father's death on 5 July 1767, he succeeded as the 8th Lord St Colme, the 9th Lord Doune, the 9th Lord Abernethy and Strathearn, and the 9th Earl of Moray, all in the Peerage of Scotland.

In 1784, he was elected as one of the sixteen Scottish representative peer elected to sit in the House of Lords, serving from 8 May 1784 to 20 May 1796. On 4 June 1796, he was created 1st Baron Stuart of Castle Stuart in the Peerage of Great Britain enabling him, suo jure to sit in the House of Lords. He served as Lord-Lieutenant of Elginshire between 1794 and 1810.

== Personal life ==
On 28 June 1763, Stuart married Hon. Jean Gray (1743–1786), daughter of John Gray, 11th Lord Gray and Margaret Blair (a daughter of Alexander Blair Carnegie, 11th Lord Kinfauns). Together, they were the parents of:

- Lady Grace Stuart (1770–1846), who married George Douglas of Cavers, son of Andrew Douglas and Mary Mercer, in 1789.
- Francis Stuart, 10th Earl of Moray (1771–1848), who married Lucy Scott, daughter of Maj.-Gen. John Scott and Hon. Margaret Dundas (a daughter of Robert Dundas Jr.), in 1795. After her death in 1798, he married Margaret Jane Ainslie, daughter of Col. Sir Philip Ainslie of Pilton and Hon. Elizabeth Gray (a daughter of the 11th Lord Gray), in 1801.
- Hon. Archibald Stuart (1771–1832), who married Cornelia Pleydell, daughter of Edmund Morton Pleydell and Anne Luttrell, in 1793.

=== Descendants ===
Through his eldest son Francis, he was a grandfather of Francis Stuart, 11th Earl of Moray, John Stuart, 12th Earl of Moray, Archibald Stuart, 13th Earl of Moray, George Stuart, 14th Earl of Moray, and Lady Jane Stuart (wife of Sir John Drummond-Stewart, 6th Baronet and Jeremiah Lonsdale Pounden).

Through his second son Archibald, he was a grandfather of Francis Archibald Stuart, John Morton Stuart, James William Stuart, Rev. Edmund Luttrell Stuart (father of Edmund Stuart, 15th Earl of Moray, Francis Stuart, 16th Earl of Moray, and Morton Stuart, 17th Earl of Moray), Douglas Wynne Stuart, and George Gray Stuart.

Honorary titles
| Preceded by None | Lord Lieutenant of Elginshire; 1794–1810 | Succeeded by Francis Stuart |
Peerage of Scotland
| Preceded by James Stuart | Earl of Moray; 1767–1810 | Succeeded by Francis Stuart |
Peerage of Great Britain
| New creation | Baron Stuart of Castle Stuart; 1796–1810 | Succeeded by Francis Stuart |
