= Frances Stewart =

Frances Stewart may refer to:

- Frances Stewart (economist) (born 1940), professor of development economics
- Frances Henrietta Stewart (1883–1962), British politician and supporter of Indian nationalism
- Frances Stewart (social activist) (1840–1916), Australian-born New Zealand social activist
- Frances Benedict Stewart, Chilean-born American citizen and spokesperson for the Bahá'í Faith
- Frankie Stewart Silver (died 1833), born Frances Stewart
- Frances Stewart, Duchess of Richmond (1647–1702), famous for refusing to be mistress of Charles II
- Frances Stewart, Duchess of Lennox (1578–1639), wife of Ludovic Stewart, Duke of Richmond and Lennox
- Frances Stewart, Marchioness of Londonderry (1751–1833)

== See also ==
- Francis Stewart (disambiguation)
