= James Stuart, 1st Viscount Stuart of Findhorn =

British politician (1897–1971)

Captain The Right Honourable The Viscount Stuart of Findhorn CH MVO MC & Bar PC
- Photograph of Stuart by Walter Stoneman, taken August 1943.

Secretary of State for Scotland
- In office 30 October 1951 – 9 January 1957
- Prime Minister: Winston Churchill; Sir Anthony Eden
- Preceded by: Hector McNeil
- Succeeded by: John Maclay

Opposition Chief Whip of the House of Commons
- In office 26 July 1945 – 4 July 1948
- Deputy: Patrick Buchan-Hepburn
- Leader: Winston Churchill
- Preceded by: William Whiteley
- Succeeded by: Patrick Buchan-Hepburn

Chief Whip of the House of Commons Parliamentary Secretary to the Treasury
- In office 14 January 1941 – 26 July 1945 Serving with Charles Edwards and William Whiteley
- Prime Minister: Winston Churchill
- Deputy: Thomas Dugdale; William Whiteley; John McEwen; William John; Leslie Pym; James Edmondson
- Preceded by: Charles Edwards
- Succeeded by: William Whiteley

Government Deputy Chief Whip in the House of Commons
- In office 27 May 1937 – 14 January 1941 Serving with William Whiteley (1940–1941)
- Prime Minister: Neville Chamberlain; Winston Churchill
- Preceded by: George Penny
- Succeeded by: Thomas Dugdale; William Whiteley

Lord Commissioner of the Treasury
- In office 1 May 1935 – 14 January 1941
- Prime Minister: Ramsay MacDonald; Stanley Baldwin; Neville Chamberlain; Winston Churchill
- Preceded by: Lambert Ward
- Succeeded by: Thomas Dugdale
Parliamentary offices
Member of the House of Lords Lord Temporal
In office 20 November 1959 – 20 February 1971; Hereditary Peerage
Preceded by	Peerage created
Succeeded by	The 2nd Viscount Stuart of Findhorn
Member of Parliament for Moray and Nairn
In office 6 December 1923 – 8 October 1959
Preceded by	Thomas Maule Guthrie
Succeeded by	Gordon Campbell

Personal details
- Born: James Gray Stuart; 9 February 1897 Edinburgh, Scotland
- Died: 20 February 1971 (aged 74) Salisbury, England
- Party: Unionist
- Spouse: Lady Rachel Cavendish (m. 1923)
- Children: 3

James Gray Stuart, 1st Viscount Stuart of Findhorn, CH, MVO, MC & Bar, PC (9 February 1897 – 20 February 1971) was a British Unionist politician. He was joint-Parliamentary Secretary to the Treasury in Winston Churchill's war-time coalition government and later served as Secretary of State for Scotland under Churchill and then Sir Anthony Eden from 1951 to 1957. In 1959 he was elevated to the peerage as Viscount Stuart of Findhorn.

== Early life ==
Born in Edinburgh, Stuart was the third and youngest son of Morton Stuart, 17th Earl of Moray, and Edith Douglas Palmer, daughter of Rear-Admiral George Palmer. He was educated at Eton College and was set to attend the University of Cambridge, but the plans were interrupted by the outbreak of World War I.

== Career ==
Stuart was commissioned from the Officers' Training Corps into the Special Reserve as a probationary Second lieutenant in the 3rd (Reserve) Battalion, Royal Scots (his probation completed in Jan 1915) and served in the war, reaching the rank of Captain. He was awarded the Military Cross and Bar in 1917.

He was appointed Equerry to HRH Prince Albert in June 1920, and was appointed a Member (4th Class) of the Royal Victorian Order in the 1922 New Year Honours, with the award dated 3 December 1921.

=== Political career ===
Stuart sat as Member of Parliament (MP) for Moray and Nairn from 1923 to 1959. He served as a Lord of the Treasury from 1935 to 1941 under successively Ramsay MacDonald, Stanley Baldwin, Neville Chamberlain and Winston Churchill and was sworn of the Privy Council in the 1939 Birthday Honours. In 1941 Churchill promoted him to joint Parliamentary Secretary to the Treasury (Government Chief Whip), which he remained until 1945. He continued as Conservative Chief Whip until 1948. In 1950 he became Chairman of the Scottish Unionist Party, a post he held until 1962.

When the Conservatives returned to power under Churchill in 1951, Stuart was made Secretary of State for Scotland, with a seat in the cabinet. He continued in this post until 1957, the last two years under the premiership of Sir Anthony Eden. He was appointed a Companion of Honour in 1957. On 20 November 1959 he was elevated to the peerage as Viscount Stuart of Findhorn, of Findhorn in the County of Moray.

== Personal life ==
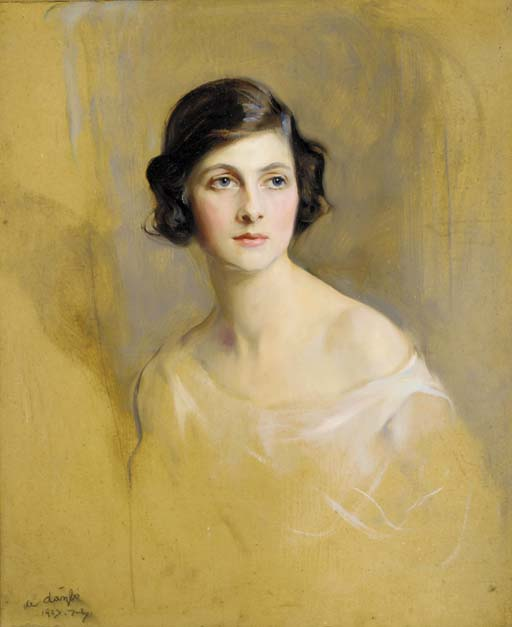
Portrait of his wife, Lady Rachel Cavendish, by Philip de László, 1923

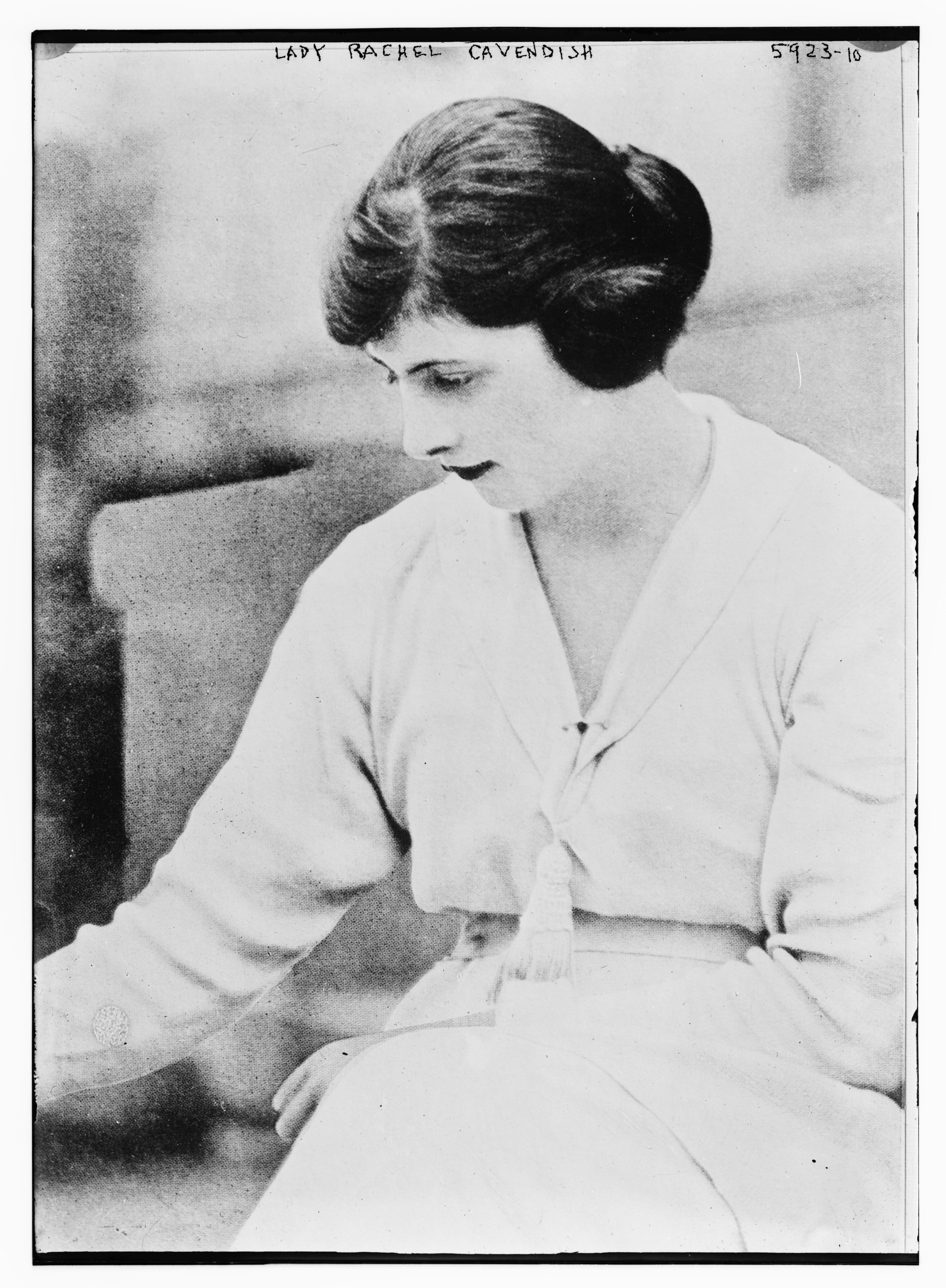
Rachel Cavendish c. 1920–1925

In 1923 Stuart married Lady Rachel Cavendish, daughter of Victor Cavendish, 9th Duke of Devonshire and Lady Evelyn Petty-Fitzmaurice (a daughter of the 5th Marquess of Lansdowne). Through his marriage, he became a brother-in-law of Lady Dorothy Cavendish, who was the wife of Harold Macmillan, the prime minister of the United Kingdom from 1957 to 1963. Together, they had three children:

- David Randolph Moray Stuart, 2nd Viscount Stuart of Findhorn (1924−1999), who married Grizel Mary Wildreda (née Fyfe) Gillilan, widow of Michael Gillilan, daughter of architect David Theodore Fyfe, in 1945. After her death in 1948, he married Marion Emelia Wilson, a daughter of Gerald Wilson, of Kintbury, in 1951. They divorced in 1979.
- Hon. John Douglas Stuart (1925−1990), a Royal Navy lieutenant who married Cecile Margaret (née Barr) Tonge (former wife of George Maurice Tonge), daughter of Gerald Harrison Barr, in 1957. They divorced in 1958 and he married Lady Caroline (née Child-Villiers) Elliot-Murray-Kynynmound, former wife of Gilbert Elliot-Murray-Kynynmound, Viscount Melgund, and eldest daughter of the 9th Earl of Jersey, in 1969. They divorced in 1980.
- Hon. Jean Davina Stuart (b. 1932), who married John Reedham Erskine Berney, son of Maj. Sir Thomas Berney, 10th Baronet, in 1951. After his death in 1952, she married Percy William Jesson, son of Lt.-Col. Harold Jesson, in 1954. After his death, she married Michael Denison Ritchie in 1985.

Stuart died at Salisbury Infirmary on 20 February 1971, aged 74, and was succeeded in the viscountcy by his elder son. His widow died in October 1977.

Before his marriage, Stuart had been noted as a suitor of Lady Elizabeth Bowes-Lyon while serving as an equerry to her eventual husband Prince Albert, Duke of York (the future King George VI).

== Arms ==
Coat of arms of James Stuart, 1st Viscount Stuart of Findhorn
Crest In a nest Vert a pelican feeding her young Or about her neck a collar engrailed Gules. Escutcheon Quarterly 1st Or a lion rampant within a double tressure flory counterflory Gules all within a bordure compony Azure and Argent (Stuart) 2nd Or a fess chequy Azure and Argent (Stewart of Downe) 3rd Or three cushions within a double tressure flory counterflory Gules (Randolph) 4th Gules a lion rampant within a bordure engrailed Argent (Gray) all within a bordure Or for difference. Supporters Two capercailzie Proper their wings closed. Motto Saius Per Christum Redemptorem

== Sources ==
- Torrance, David, The Scottish Secretaries (Birlinn 2006)
- Stuart, James; Viscount Stuart of Findhorn. Within the Fringe: An Autobiography

Parliament of the United Kingdom
Preceded by Thomas Maule Guthrie	Member of Parliament for Moray and Nairn; 1923–1959	Succeeded by Gordon Campbell
Political offices
Preceded by David Margesson; Sir Charles Edwards	Joint Parliamentary Secretary to the Treasury; 1941–July 1945; With: Sir Charles Edwards 1941–1942; William Whiteley 1942–May 1945	Succeeded by William Whiteley
Preceded by Hector McNeil	Secretary of State for Scotland; 1951–1957	Succeeded by John Maclay
Party political offices
Preceded by George Penny	Conservative Deputy Chief Whip in the House of Commons; 1937–1941	Succeeded by Thomas Dugdale
Preceded by David Margesson	Chief Whip of the Conservative Party; 1941–1948	Succeeded by Patrick Buchan-Hepburn
Peerage of the United Kingdom
New creation	Viscount Stuart of Findhorn; 1959–1971	Succeeded by David Stuart
