= Frank H. Stewart House =

Historic house in Massachusetts, United States

- U.S. National Register of Historic Places
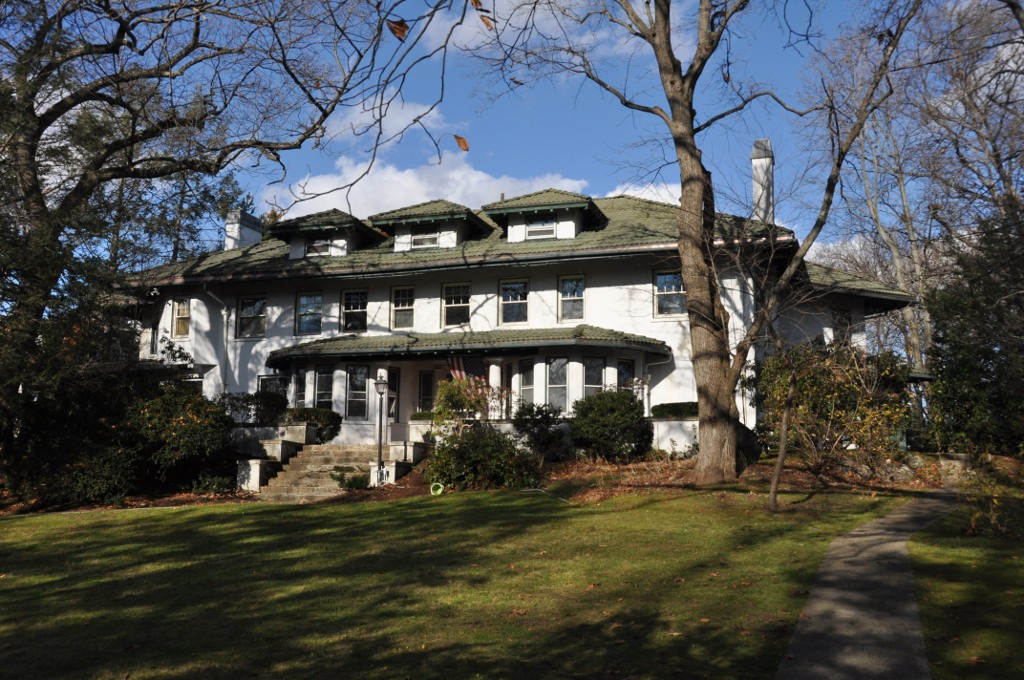

- Location within Massachusetts Location within the United States
- Location: 41 Montvale Rd., Newton, Massachusetts
- Coordinates: 42°20′8.5″N 71°11′2.6″W
- Built: 1909
- Architectural style: Classical Revival
- MPS: Newton MRA
- NRHP reference No.: 90000111
- Added to NRHP: February 21, 1990

The Frank H. Stewart House is a historic house at 41 Montvale Road in Newton, Massachusetts. The 2 1/2-story stucco-clad house was built in 1909 for Frank H. Stewart, a lawyer. It is located in an Olmsted-designed subdivision, and is one Newton's finest large Classical Revival houses. It has a green tile hipped roof with exposed rafter ends, pierced by three hip-roofed dormers. The main facade has a front porch that merges into two flanking single-story projecting bays, all also topped by a green tile roof. There are flanking side sections fronted by porches.

The house was listed on the National Register of Historic Places in 1990.

== See also ==
- National Register of Historic Places listings in Newton, Massachusetts
