= Douglas Stuart, 20th Earl of Moray =

British peer (1928–2011)

The Right Honourable The Earl of Moray
- Born: Douglas John Moray Stuart; 13 February 1928; Johannesburg, South Africa
- Died: 23 September 2011 (aged 83)
- Education: Hilton College
- Alma mater: Trinity College, Cambridge
- Spouse: Lady Malvina Dorothea Murray (m. 1964; died 2011)
- Children: John Douglas Stuart, 21st Earl of Moray; Lady Louisa Helena Stuart
- Parent(s): Archibald Stuart, 19th Earl of Moray; Mabel Helen Maud Wilson
- Relatives: Morton Stuart, 17th Earl of Moray (grandfather)

Douglas John Moray Stuart, 20th Earl of Moray (13 February 1928 – 23 September 2011), styled Lord Doune from 1943 to 1974, was a Scottish peer.

== Early life ==
Stuart was born on 13 February 1928 in Johannesburg, South Africa. He was the eldest son of Archibald Stuart, 19th Earl of Moray (1894–1974) and Mabel Helen Maud "May" Wilson (d. 1968). Among his siblings were Lady Hermione Mary Morton Stuart (who married Rear Admiral John Oliver Roberts, and, after their divorce, Prince Friedrich Karl Viktor Stefan Christian of Prussia), Hon. Charles Rodney Stanford Stuart (who married Sasha Ann Lewis, and, after their divorce, Frauke Stender), and Hon. James Wallace Wilson Stuart (who married Jane Scott Richards).

His paternal grandparents were Morton Stuart, 17th Earl of Moray and Edith Douglas Palmer (a daughter of Rear-Admiral George Palmer). His maternal grandfather was Benjamin Wilson of Battlefields, Zimbabwe (who went by the nick-name of Matabele).

His father had purchased a remote cattle ranch, Saas Poste, to the east of the Kalahari Desert in Botswana, then Bechuanaland Protectorate, in 1922. He was educated at Hilton College, located near the town of Hilton in the KwaZulu-Natal Midlands, South Africa. In 1947, he matriculated at Trinity College, Cambridge.

== Career ==
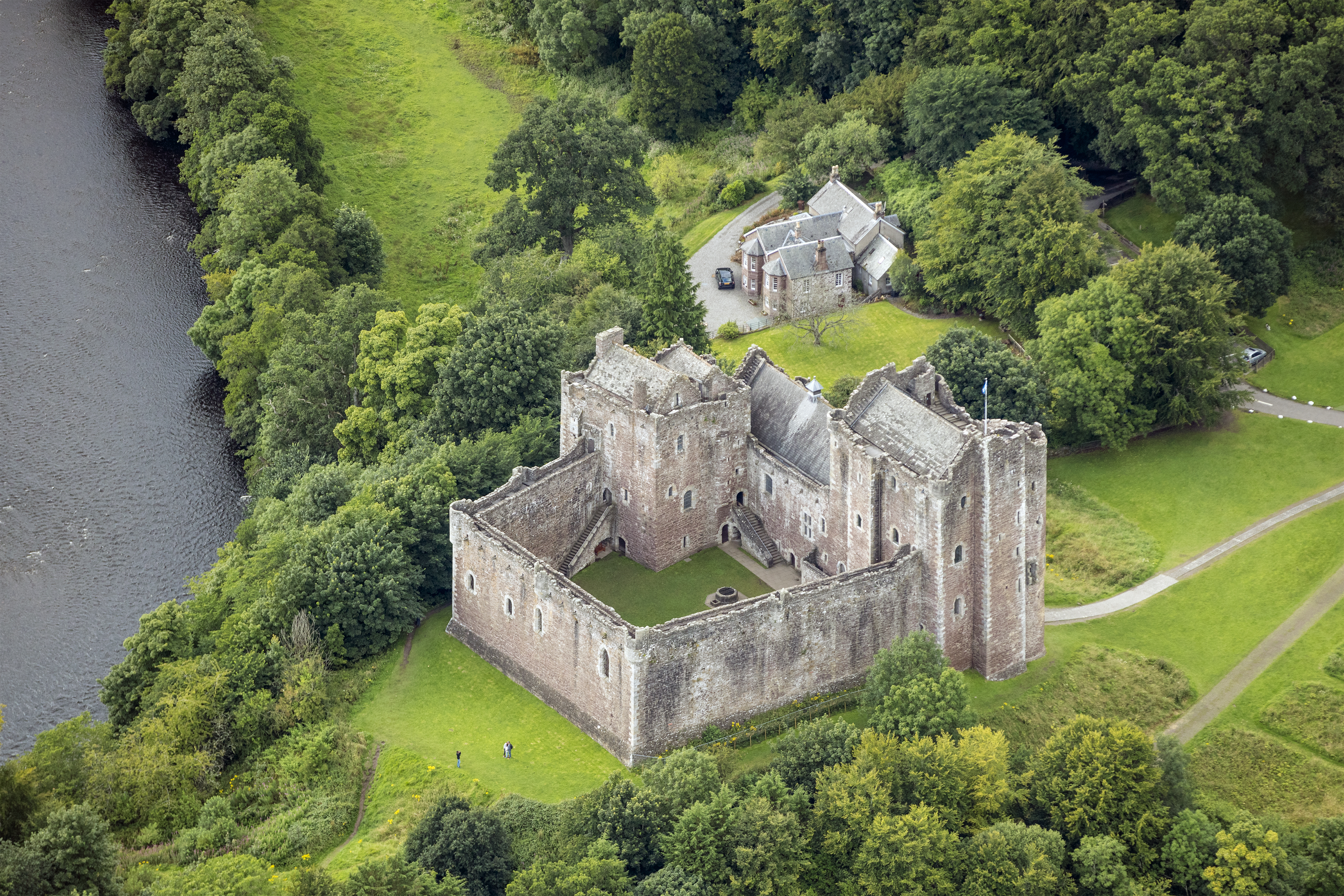
Aerial of Doune Castle, August 2016

He was appointed Fellow, Land Agents' Society in 1948 and then a Fellow, Royal Institution of Chartered Surveyors. In 1984, the Moray placed Doune Castle, which had been held by the family since 1570, into the care of the nation. It is now looked after by Historic Scotland.

On his father's death in 1974, he succeeded to the earldom of Moray, among others in the Peerage of Scotland and the 12th Baron Stuart of Castle Stuart in the Peerage of Great Britain. He lost his seat in the House of Lords after the reforms of the House of Lords Act 1999.

=== Car collection ===
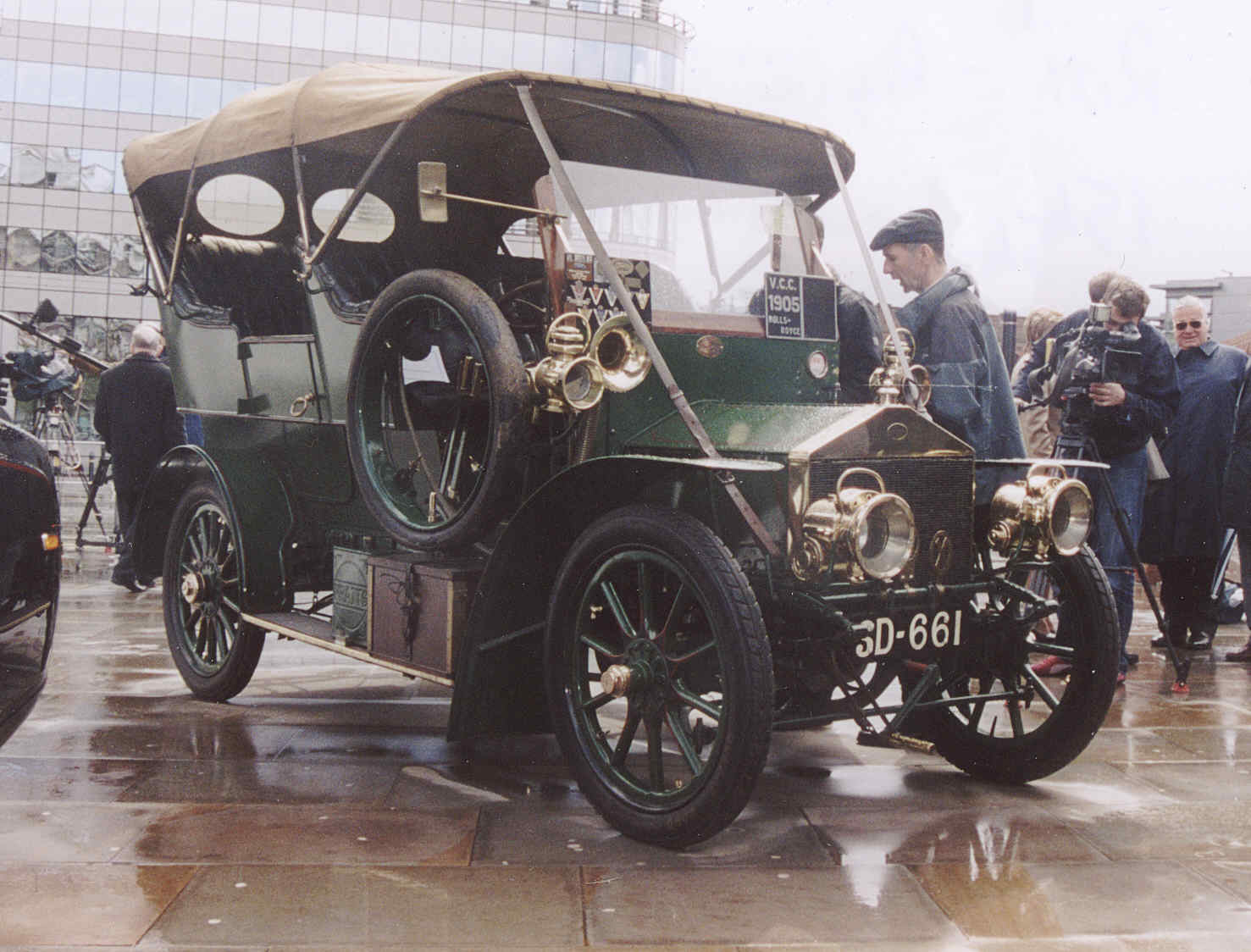
Three Stroke Rolls-Royce (1905) the only remaining example in the world

Lord Doune's car collection began in 1953 and by 1970 it was decided to open the collection to the public as the Doune Motor Museum. This linked in turn to one of the world's steepest races: The Doune Hill Climb, a timed event. Before the museum closed on 30 November 1998, his collection included:

- Three Stroke Rolls-Royce (1905) the only remaining example, out of 6 built, and second oldest Rolls Royce in the world
- Sunbeam 3 litre (1913)
- Citroen 5CV (1923)
- Hispano-Suiza 37 hp (1924)
- Bentley Speed Six 6.5 litre (1929)
- Bentley 8 litre (1930)
- Lanchester Coupe (1932)
- Invicta 4.5 litre (1933)
- Hispano-Suiza Ballot (1934)
- Aston Martin Le Mans (1934)
- Riley Nine Lincock (1934)
- Bugatti 57C (1938)
- BMW 328 (1938)
- Rolls-Royce Phantom Continental (1935)
- Jaguar SS 100 (1937)
- Lagonda V12 (1937)
- Nardi Danese (1947)
- Morgan Plus Four (1951)
- Jaguar XK120 (1951)
- Daimler Conquest Roadster (1956)
- Iso Grifo (1968)
- Ford GT40 (1965)
- Volvo P1800S (1966)
- Ferrari Dino (1973)

== Personal life ==
On 27 January 1964, he married Lady Malvina Dorothea Murray (b. 1936), daughter of Mungo Murray, 7th Earl of Mansfield and Mansfield, and Dorothea Carnegie (a daughter of diplomat Sir Lancelot Carnegie). Together, they were the parents of two children:

- John Douglas Stuart, 21st Earl of Moray (b. 1966), who married Catherine Lawson, a daughter of Professor Alan G. Lawson of Trinity College, Dublin, in 2000.
- Lady Louisa Helena Stuart (b. 1968), who married David John Stewart Howitt of Kinlochmoidart House, son of Capt. Michael Howitt, in 2002.

Lord Moray died on 23 September 2011 and was succeeded in his titles by his only son, John. The Dowager Countess and her daughter Lady Louisa Howitt (née Stuart) are Patronesses of the Royal Caledonian Ball.

Peerage of Scotland
Preceded by Archibald Stuart	Earl of Moray; 1974–2011	Succeeded by John Douglas Stuart
