= Janet Dunbar =

American composer

Dr. Janet Dunbar is an American composer.

== Biography ==
=== Musical life ===
Dunbar earned a Doctor of Musical Arts degree in Composition at Stanford University, working under composers Chris Chafe, John Chowning, Jonathan Harvey and Wayne Peterson.

During the years when Dunbar worked at CCRMA (Center for Computer Research in Music and Acoustics, Stanford University), the composer produced computer music compositions which integrated traditional instruments, poetic recitations and vocal melodies with algorithmically composed music which was seeded with world music motives. This algorithmic composition and digital synthesis required fluency in computer languages including Common Lisp, Common Lisp Music and Heinrich Taube's Stella. This work culminated in the production of the CD, Spirit Journey. Prior to the CCRMA years, Dunbar earned a Master of Arts degree in Music from San Jose State University, where the composer studied composition, counterpoint and agogic accents with Tikey Zes, electronic music composition with Allen Strange, and instrumental composition with Jorge Liderman. Currently Dunbar composes works for orchestra,

== Selected compositions ==
=== Orchestral ===
- Emergence (2010)
- Episodes (2010)
- Déjà Vu (2010)
- Vision (Visión) (2009)
- Epiphany (Epifanía) (2009)
- Symphony of the Woods (2008)

=== Choral ===
- Ave Maria for mixed chorus (2008)
- Glory to God in the Highest for SAT/B (1992)
- Agnus Dei for SAT (1990)

=== Chamber ===
- An Inexplicable Variation Fixation for string quartet (2009)
- Transformation (Transformación) for guitar quartet (2009)
- Autumn Autograph for two guitars (2008)
- When the Spirit Moves You… for string quartet (2008)
- Spring Fever Triptych for two guitars (2008)
- Duo for trumpet and electric guitar with piano accompaniment (2008)
- The Radiance of Her Light, I-III for soprano, performance poet, and two percussionists, (1996–1997)
- Inanna and the Divine Essences for soprano, violin and cello (1995)
- South Fork of a Daystream for violin and guitar (1993)
- A Light Left On for soprano and piano (1993)
- Guitar Quartet (1992)
- String Quintet (1991) for string quartet and guitar

=== Solo ===
- Inside My Wildest Dreams for solo piano (2010)
- Subterranean Grotto for solo double bass (2008)
- Sleep Dancing (Bailando en Sueños) for solo guitar (2008)
- Vary Vary Rondo for solo horn (2008)
- Recuerdos de Segovia for solo guitar (2007): revised 2008
- Mutated Permutations for solo flute (1992)
- Variations after Bartok for solo piano (1992)
- Crystal Mines for solo piano (1992)
- Dances for solo piano (1992)
- Theme and Variations for solo piano (1992)
- Two Part Invention for solo piano (1991)
- Fugue for solo piano (1991)
- Charles Ives Visits the Red River Valley for solo piano (1990)
- Twelve Tones Stand Alone for solo guitar (1990)
- Antonym for solo piano (1990)
- Subject and Reflection for solo piano (1990)

=== Computer music ===
- Spirit Journey CD (1999)
- Song of the Sea, I-X for soprano, performance poet, and CD (1997–1998)
- Song of the Bear, I-II for soprano, performance poet, and CD (1996)
- Nine Prayers, I-III for soprano, performance poet and CD (1996)
- Song of the Shaman, I-IV for soprano, performance poet, percussionist and CD (1995)
- Life on Earth, I-III for performance poet and tape (1994)
- Jailbreak on tape (1990)
