= Charles Stuart, 6th Earl of Moray =

Scottish noble

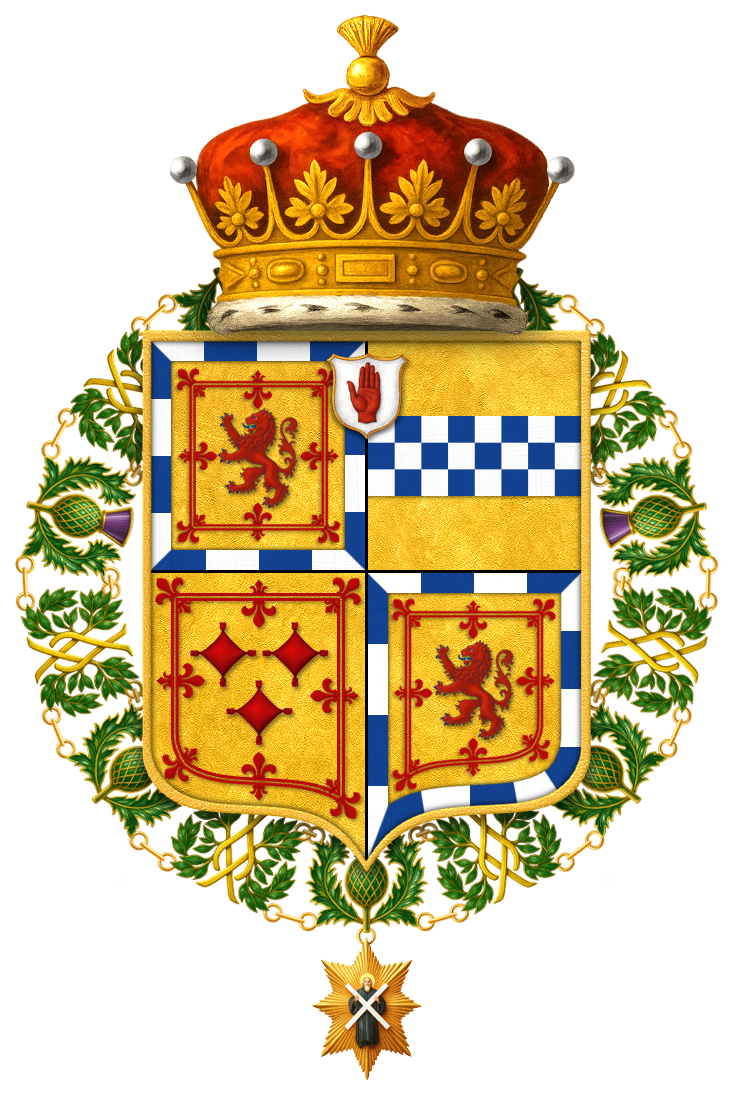
Shield of arms of Charles Stuart, 6th Earl of Moray, KT, encircled by the collar of the Order of the Thistle.

Charles Stuart, 6th Earl of Moray, 1st Baronet, KT (before 1683 – 7 October 1735) was a Scottish nobleman, the son of Alexander Stuart, 5th Earl of Moray and his wife, Emilia Balfour. He acceded to his father's titles in 1701 and died in 1735.

Charles Stuart married Anne Campbell (died 1734). She was the daughter of Archibald Campbell, 9th Earl of Argyll and the widow of Richard Maitland, 4th Earl of Lauderdale (who lived at Halton House). He was succeeded by his brother, Francis.

Peerage of Scotland
Preceded by Alexander Stuart	Earl of Moray; 1701–1735	Succeeded by Francis Stuart
Baronetage of Nova Scotia
New creation	Baronet (of Rumbelows); 1681–1735	Extinct
