= Alexander Stuart, 5th Earl of Moray =

Scottish peer and politician (1634–1701)

The Right Honourable The Earl of Moray KT PC
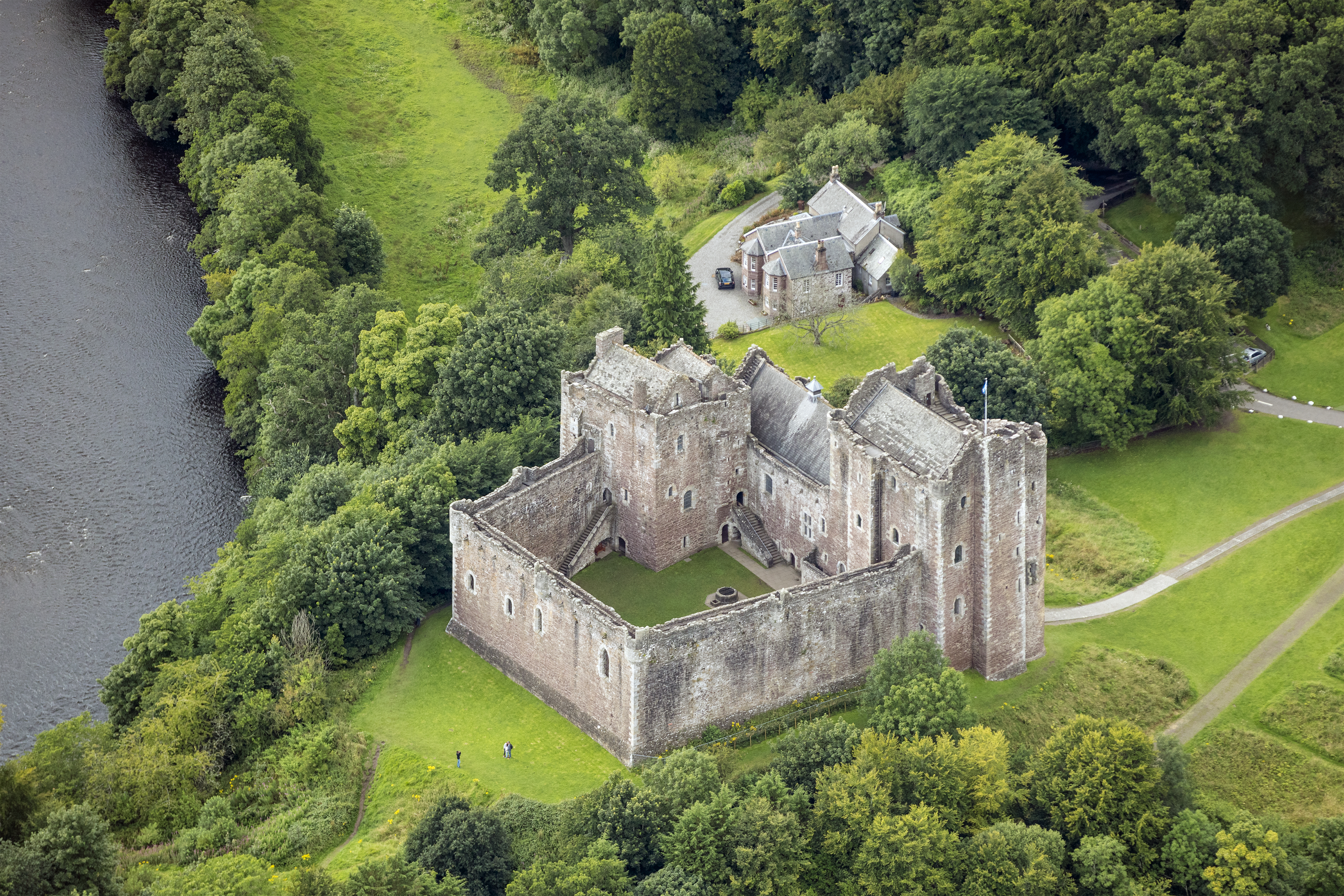
- Doune Castle, owned by the Earls of Moray

Lord High Commissioner
- In office 1686–1688
- Monarch: James II & VII
- Preceded by: Duke of Queensberry
- Succeeded by: Duke of Hamilton

Secretary of State in Scotland
- In office 1680–1686
- Monarch: Charles II (1680–1685)
- Preceded by: Duke of Lauderdale
- Succeeded by: Earl of Melfort

Extraordinary Lord of Session
- In office 1680–1681
- Monarch: Charles II

Commissioner of the Treasury
- In office 1678–1679
- Monarch: Charles II

Lord Justice General
- In office 1675–1676
- Monarch: Charles II

Personal details
- Born: Alexander Stewart; 8 May 1634 (baptised) Darnaway Castle
- Died: 1 November 1701 (aged 67) Donibristle
- Resting place: Dyke, Moray
- Spouse: Emilia Balfour (1646–1683)
- Children: James, Lord Doune (1660–1685); Charles, 6th Earl (1673–1735); Francis, 7th Earl (1673–1739); John (1675–1765); Emilia (after 1706)
- Parents: James, 4th Earl (1611–1653); Lady Margaret Home (1607–1683)
- Occupation: Politician

Alexander Stuart, 5th Earl of Moray, KT, PC (8 May 1634 – 1 November 1701) was a Scottish peer who held senior political office in Scotland under Charles II and James VII and II.

He was first brought into government in 1676 by the Duke of Lauderdale, his relative by marriage; between 1681 and 1686, he played a prominent role in the suppression of Presbyterian radicals, known as "the Killing Time". He retained his position when James succeeded in 1685 and supported his religious policies, having converted to Catholicism in 1686.

Removed from office after the 1688 Glorious Revolution, he retired from public life and died at Donibristle on 1 November 1701.

== Life ==
Alexander Stuart was born in May 1634, second son of James, 4th Earl of Moray and Lady Margaret Home (1607–1683). His elder brother James died young and Alexander succeeded his father as Earl of Moray in 1653. He was one of eight children; in addition to James, the others being Mary (1628–1668), Margaret (1631–1667), Francis (born 1636), Henrietta (1640–1713), Archibald (1643–1688), and Anne (1644–1719).

In 1658, he married Emilia Balfour, daughter of Sir William Balfour and they had James, Lord Doune (1660–1685), who married Catherine Tollemache, Charles, 6th Earl (1673–1735), Francis, 7th Earl (1673–1739), John who died unmarried and without legitimate issue but had at least one son named William B.1737 in Banffshire (1675–1765) and Emilia (died after 1706).

== Biography ==
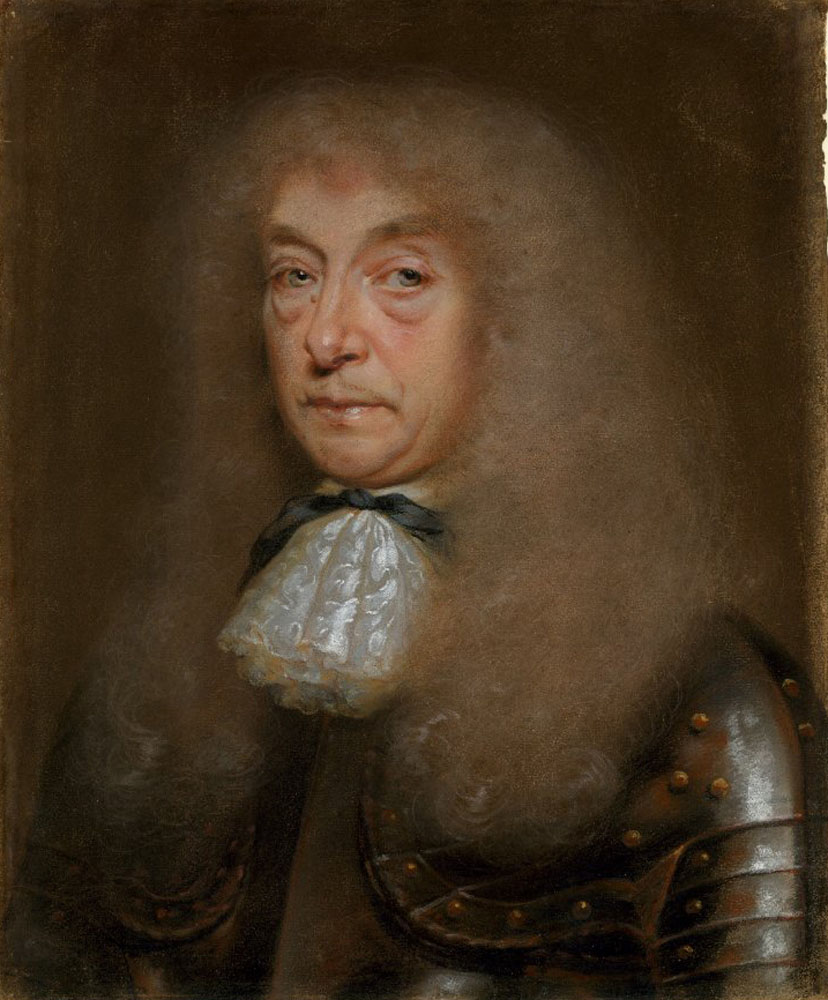
Moray owed political office to the Duke of Lauderdale, his uncle by marriage

During the Wars of the Three Kingdoms, his father raised a regiment that fought for the Covenanters against Royalist forces led by Montrose. He also supported the attempt to restore Charles I to power in the Second English Civil War, then Charles II in 1651.

Alexander succeeded his father as Earl of Moray on 4 March 1653, shortly after Scotland was incorporated into The Protectorate. After defeating the Royalist Glencairn's Rising in 1654, the new administration decided to draw a line under the civil wars and adopted a number of conciliatory measures. One of these was the 1654 Act of Grace and Pardon; a small number of key individuals had their estates confiscated, with others paying a fine. Moray was one of 73 individuals included in this list, although the original amount of £3,500 was eventually reduced to £500.

After the Restoration of Charles II in 1660, Moray became a Privy Councillor but remained a minor political figure. He was known as an opponent of Presbyterian radicals and in 1675, his uncle by marriage, the Duke of Lauderdale, named him Lord Justice General, replacing the Marquess of Atholl. He helped enforce increasingly harsh policies, including the death penalty for preaching at services held outside the approved church, or Conventicles, and was made a Commissioner of the Treasury in 1678.

In 1679, dissidents murdered Archbishop Sharp and Moray helped put down a short-lived rebellion. This resulted in his appointment on 17 July 1680 as an Extraordinary Lord of Session; when Lauderdale was dismissed soon after, he nominated Moray as Secretary of State in his place. James approved this, but insisted Moray share the position, first with Middleton, then Melfort.

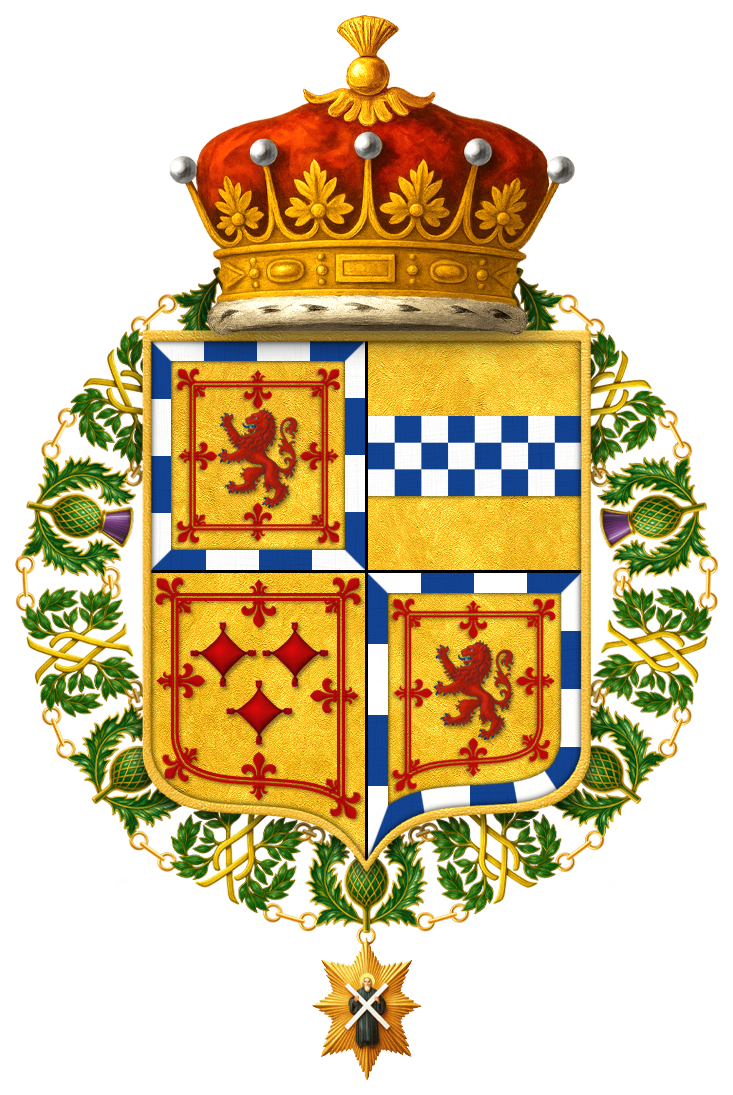
Shield of Arms of Alexander Stuart, 5th Earl of Moray, surmounting the collar of the Order of the Thistle

James became king in February 1685 with strong support in England and Scotland, leading to the rapid collapse of Argyll's Rising in June. However, measures for Catholic relief undercut the moderate Presbyterians and Episcopalians who then controlled the Church of Scotland and formed James' main support base. Their opposition forced him to rely on an ever smaller circle of loyalists; in 1686, Moray was appointed Lord High Commissioner to the Parliament of Scotland, charged with ensuring repeal of the 1681 Test Act.

Moray had converted to Catholicism in 1686; although this was not made this public until 1687, many suspected it and challenged his right to hold office at all. Despite threats and the removal from office of opponents, the Scottish Parliament refused to pass these measures, forcing James to use the Royal Prerogative.

In recognition of his status, Moray was one of eight founding members of the Order of the Thistle, created by James in 1687 to reward his key supporters. After the Glorious Revolution in November 1688, he was deprived of all his offices. He died at Donibristle on 1 November 1701, and buried in the church of Dyke on 24 January 1702.

Political offices
Preceded by The Duke of Lauderdale	Secretary of State, Scotland; 1680–1688; With: The Earl of Middleton 1682–1684; The Earl of Melfort 1684–1688	Succeeded by The Earl of Melfort
Parliament of Scotland
Preceded by The Duke of Queensberry	Lord High Commissioner; 1686	Succeeded by The Duke of Hamilton
Peerage of Scotland
Preceded by James Stuart	Earl of Moray; 1653–1701	Succeeded by Charles Stuart
