= Francis Stuart, 16th Earl of Moray =

British peer (1842–1909)

Lt.-Col. The Right Honourable The Earl of Moray JP DL
- Born: Francis James Stuart; 24 November 1842
- Died: 20 November 1909 (aged 66)
- Spouse: Gertrude Floyer Smith (m. 1879; died 1909)
- Parent(s): Edmund Luttrell Stuart; Elizabeth Jackson
- Relatives: Edmund Stuart, 15th Earl of Moray (brother); Morton Stuart, 17th Earl of Moray (brother)

Lieutenant Colonel Francis James Stuart, 16th Earl of Moray JP DL (24 November 1842 – 20 November 1909) was a Scottish peer and soldier.

== Early life ==
Stuart was born on 16 April 1855. He was the second son of the Rev. Edmund Luttrell Stuart and Elizabeth (née Jackson) Stuart. Among his siblings were elder brother Edmund Archibald Stuart (who he succeeded to become the 16th Earl of Moray in 1901) and Morton Gray Stuart (who succeeded him as the 17th Earl of Moray in 1909).

His paternal grandparents were Hon. Archibald Stuart (second son of the 9th Earl of Moray) and Cornelia Pleydell (a daughter of Edmund Morton Pleydell, MP for Dorchester and Dorset). His maternal grandfather was the Rev. J. L. Jackson.

A soldier, he became a lieutenant colonel in the Liverpool Regiment.

== Career ==
Upon the death of his elder brother, Edmund Stuart, 15th Earl of Moray on 16 March 1895, he succeeded as the 14th Earl of Moray (as well as the 14th Lord St Colme, 16th Lord Abernethy and Strathearn, the 15th Lord Doune, all in the Peerage of Scotland, and the 7th Baron Stuart of Castle Stuart in the Peerage of Great Britain.

He served as Deputy Lieutenant for Perthshire and was a justice of the peace for Dorset, Perthshire, and for Fife.

== Personal life ==
On 24 June 1879, Stuart married Gertrude Floyer Smith, daughter of the Rev. Francis Smith, Rector of Tarrant Rushton (a son of Sir John Wyldbore Smith, 2nd Baronet) and Mary Isabella Bogue (a daughter of Capt. Richard Bogue). They did not have any children.

Lord Moray died on 20 November 1909 and was succeeded in the earldom by his younger brother, Morton Gray Stuart. His widow, the dowager Lady Moray, died on 15 March 1928.

Peerage of Scotland
Preceded by Edmund Archibald Stuart	Earl of Moray; 1901–1909	Succeeded by Morton Gray Stuart
