= James Stuart, 8th Earl of Moray =

Scottish noble

The Right Honourable The Earl of Moray KT
- Tenure: 1739 to 1767
- Predecessor: Francis Stuart, 7th Earl of Moray (1673-1739)
- Successor: Francis Stuart, 9th Earl of Moray (1737-1810)
- Born: James Stuart; 1708
- Died: 5 July 1767 (aged 58–59)
- Residence: Darnaway Castle
- Locality: Moray
- Offices: Scottish representative peer 1741 to 1767; Grand Master, Masonic Grand Lodge of Scotland 1744-1745
- Spouses: Grace Lockhart (1706-1738); Margaret Wemyss (died 1779)
- Issue: Francis (1737-1810), James (1741-1809), David (died 1784)
- Parents: Francis Stuart, 7th Earl of Moray (1673-1739); Jean Elphinstone (1682-1739)

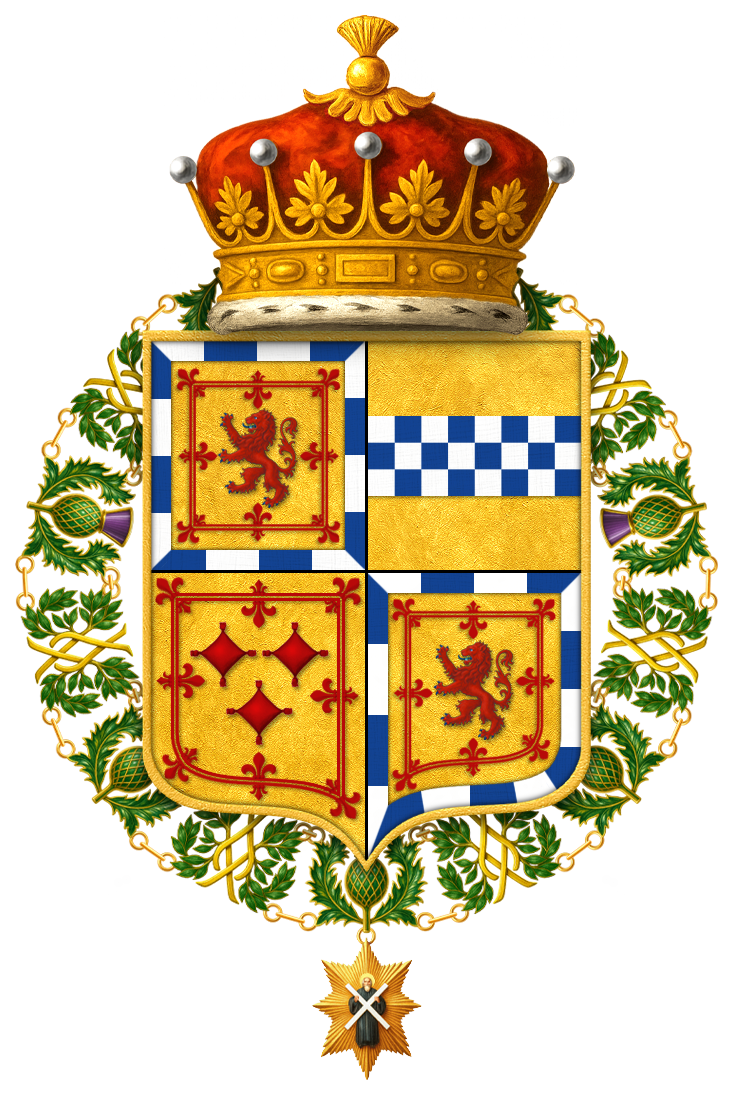
Shield of arms of James Stuart, 8th Earl of Moray, KT, encircled with the collar of the Order of the Thistle

James Stuart, 8th Earl of Moray, KT (1708 – 5 July 1767) was a Scottish nobleman. He was the son of Francis Stuart, 7th Earl of Moray. In 1741, he was elected as one of the 16 Scottish representative peers who sat in the post-1707 British House of Lords, a position he retained until his death.

== Life ==
James Stuart was born in 1708

In 1734, James married Grace Lockhart (1706–1738), granddaughter of the 9th Earl of Eglington and widow of 3rd Earl of Aboyne. Before her death in 1738, they had two children, Francis, (1737–1810), who succeeded as Earl of Moray, and Euphemia (1738–1771). He married again in 1740, this time to Margaret Wemyss, eldest daughter of the Earl of Wemyss; they had two sons, Lt-Colonel James Stuart (1741–1809), (Note: Captain, 20th Foot, 1762; Lieutenant-Colonel Sutherland Fencibles, 1793; deputy-governor of Fort George, 1777; Captain, North British Veteran Battalion, 1803; Died at Fort George 4 May 1808) and Lieutenant (RN) David Stuart (1745–1784). (Note: Died Budleigh Salterton, Devon, 12 June 1784)

In 1755 he purchased Balmerino House in Leith from the Crown who had confiscated the house due to Lord Balmerino's active support of the Jacobite Rebellion.

== Sources ==
- Debrett, John, ed. (1825). Debrett's Peerage of England, Scotland, and Ireland: Vol II. J Moyes, London.

Masonic offices
Preceded by 5th Earl of Wemyss	Grand Master of the Grand Lodge of Scotland; 1744–1745	Succeeded by 10th Earl of Buchan
Peerage of Scotland
Preceded by Francis Stuart	Earl of Moray; 1746–1767	Succeeded by Francis Stuart
