= Chris Chafe =

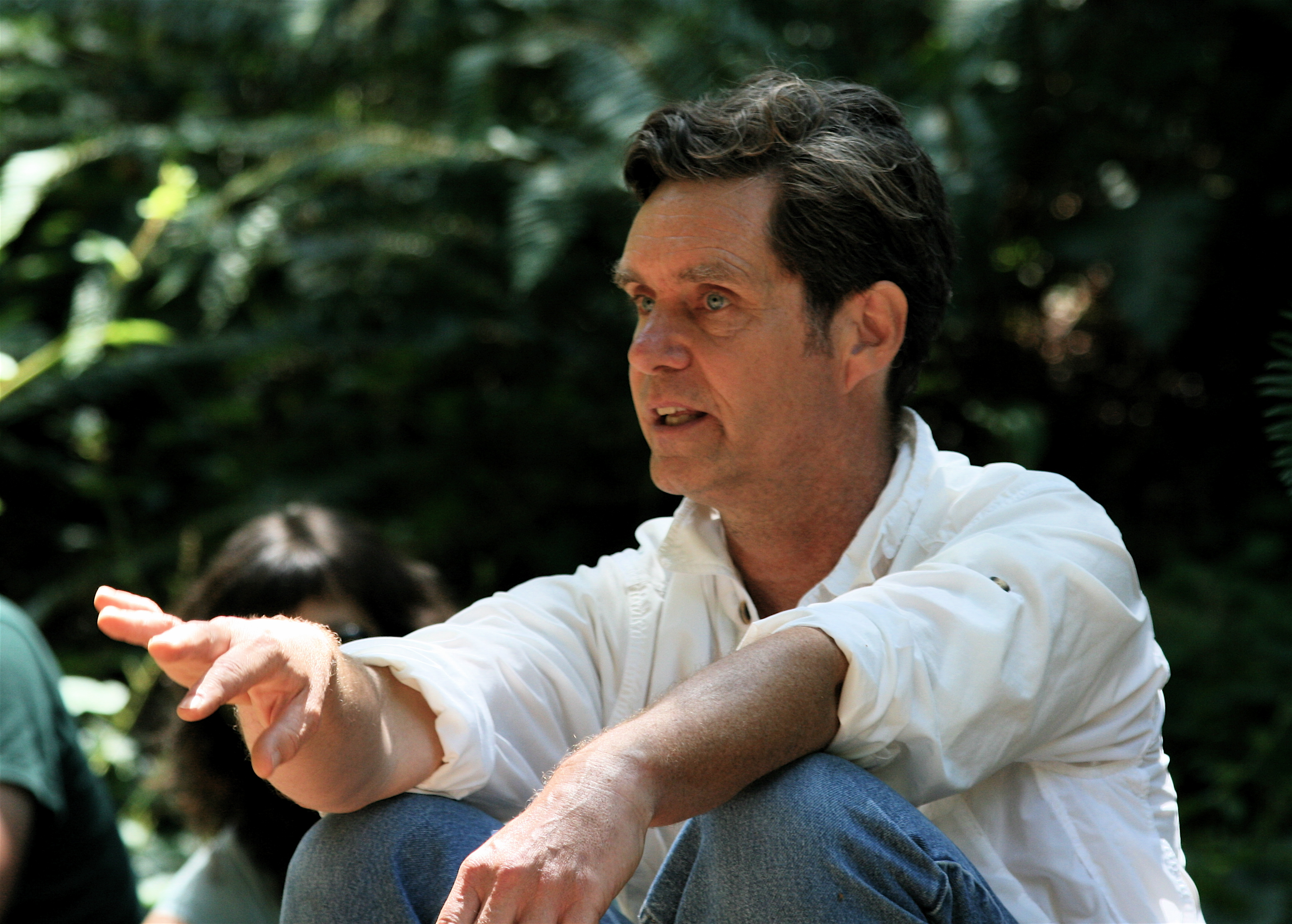
Chris Chafe.

Christopher David Chafe, born 1952 in Bern, Switzerland, is a musician, scientist, and the director of the Stanford University Center for Computer Research in Music and Acoustics (CCRMA). He is Duca Family Professor at Stanford University, holding a Doctor of Musical Arts in music composition from Stanford University (1983), a Master of Arts in music composition from University of California, San Diego, and a Bachelor of Arts in music from Antioch College. He won a Net Challenge Prize from the IEEE and Association for Computing Machinery in 2000, and a National Science Foundation research award in 1999. He has been performing with the Tintinnabulate ensemble at Rensselaer Polytechnic Institute. He is currently the department chair of Stanford University's music department.

== Patents ==
- US No. 6,801,939 (2004) "Method for Evaluating Quality of Service of a Digital Network Connection"
- US No. 5,508,473 (1996) "Music Synthesizer and Method for Simulating Period Synchronous Noise Associated with Air Flows in Wind Instruments"
- US No. 5,157,216 (1992) "Musical Synthesizer System and Method Using Pulsed Noise for Simulating the Noise Component of Musical Tones"
