= Edmund Stuart, 15th Earl of Moray =

British peer (1840–1901)

The Right Honourable The Earl of Moray JP DL
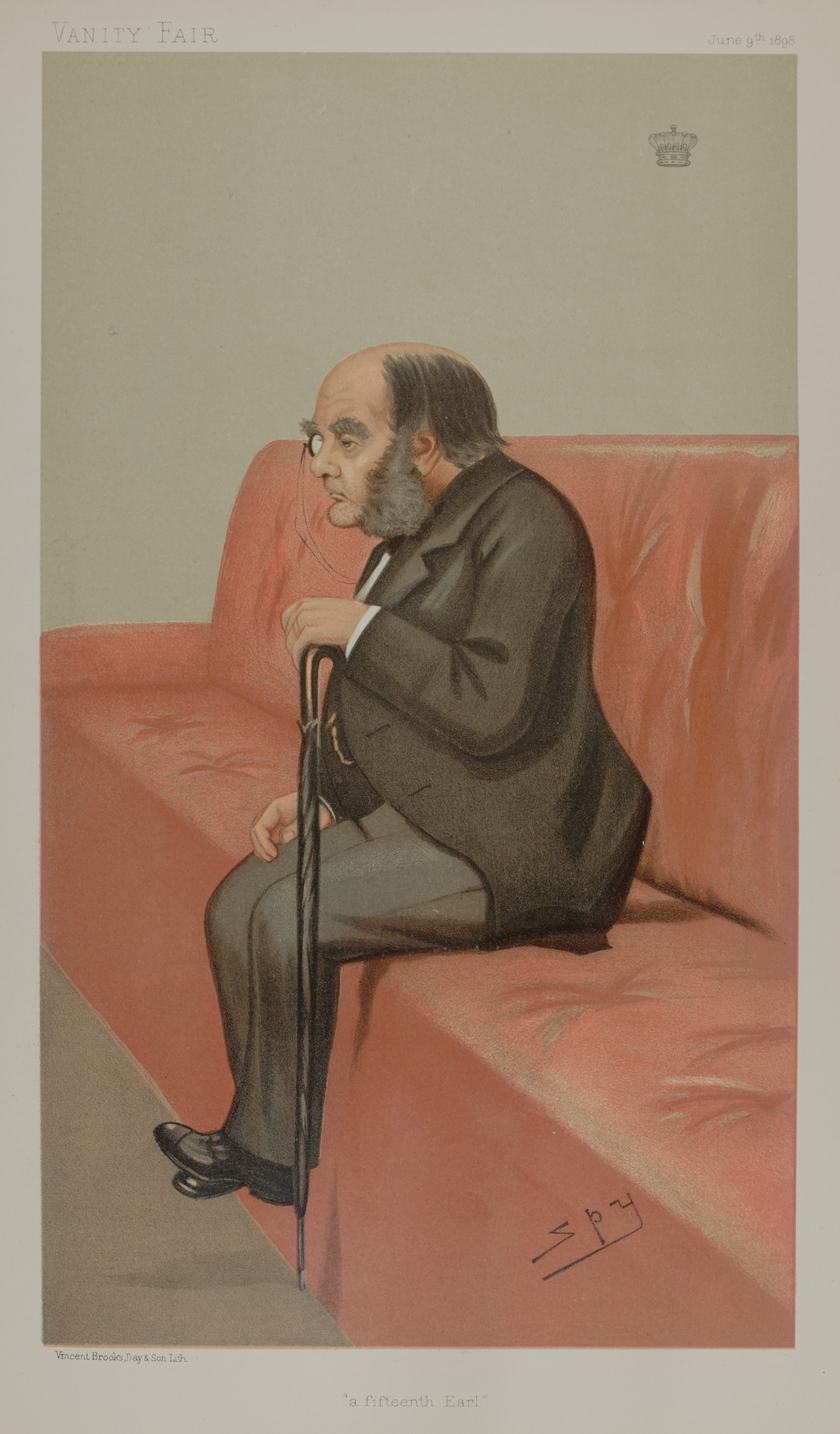
- Caricature of Lord Moray, published in Vanity Fair by "Spy" (Leslie Ward), 9 June 1898.
- Born: Edmund Archibald Stuart; 5 November 1840
- Died: 11 June 1901 (aged 60)
- Education: St John's College, Cambridge
- Spouse: Anna Mary Collinson (m. 1877; died 1901)
- Parent(s): Edmund Luttrell Stuart; Elizabeth Jackson

Edmund Archibald Stuart, 15th Earl of Moray JP DL (5 November 1840 – 11 June 1901) was a Scottish peer and a practising barrister.

== Early life ==
Stuart was born on 16 April 1855. He was the eldest son of the Rev. Edmund Luttrell Stuart and Elizabeth (née Jackson) Stuart. Among his siblings were younger brothers, Francis James Stuart (who succeeded him to become the 16th Earl of Moray in 1901) and Morton Gray Stuart (who succeeded Francis to become 17th Earl of Moray in 1909).

His paternal grandparents were Hon. Archibald Stuart (second son of the 9th Earl of Moray) and Cornelia Pleydell (a daughter of Edmund Morton Pleydell, MP for Dorchester and Dorset). His maternal grandfather was the Rev. J. L. Jackson.

He graduated from Exeter College, Oxford and became a practising barrister.

== Career ==
Upon the death of his distant cousin, George Stuart, 14th Earl of Moray on 16 March 1895, he succeeded as the 15th Earl of Moray (as well as the 13th Lord St Colme, 15th Lord Abernethy and Strathearn, the 15th Lord Doune, all in the Peerage of Scotland, and the 7th Baron Stuart of Castle Stuart in the Peerage of Great Britain.

He served as Deputy Lieutenant of Inverness-shire and Perthshire and was a justice of the peace for Inverness-shire and Perthshire..

== Personal life ==
On 6 September 1877, Stuart married Anna Mary Collinson (1859–1915), the daughter of the Rev. George J. Collinson of Clapham. They did not have any children.

Lord Moray died on 11 June 1901 and was succeeded in the earldom by his brother, Francis James Stuart. As his brother died without issue in 1909, the earldom passed to their younger brother, Morton Gray Stuart. His widow, the dowager Lady Moray, died on 20 January 1915.

Peerage of Scotland
Preceded by George Stuart	Earl of Moray; 1895–1901	Succeeded by Francis James Stuart
