= John Stuart, 12th Earl of Moray =

Scottish politician (1797–1867)

The Right Honourable John Stuart
- Earl of Moray
- Predecessor: Francis Stuart, 11th Earl of Moray
- Successor: Archibald George Stuart, 13th Earl of Moray
- Born: 25 January 1797
- Died: 8 November 1867 (aged 70)
- Father: Francis Stuart, 10th Earl of Moray
- Mother: Lucy Scott

John Stuart, 12th Earl of Moray (25 January 1797 – 8 November 1867), styled The Honourable John Stuart between 1810 and 1859, was a Scottish soldier and politician.

== Background ==
Moray was a younger son of Francis Stuart, 10th Earl of Moray, and Lucy, daughter of Major-General John Scott.

== Career ==
Moray was a captain in the British Army and also sat as Member of Parliament for Newport from 1825 to 1826. In 1859 he succeeded his elder brother in the earldom and entered the House of Lords.

== Personal life ==
Lord Moray died in November 1867, aged 70. He never married and was succeeded in the earldom by his half-brother, Archibald Stuart.

Parliament of the United Kingdom
Preceded by Sir Leonard Worsley-Holmes, Bt; Charles Duncombe	Member of Parliament for Newport; 1825–1826; With: Charles Duncombe	Succeeded by George Canning; William Henry John Scott
Peerage of Scotland
Preceded by Francis Stuart	Earl of Moray; 1859–1867	Succeeded by George Stuart
