= Morton Stuart, 17th Earl of Moray =

British peer (1855–1930)

The Right Honourable The Earl of Moray
- Born: Morton Gray Stuart; 16 April 1855
- Died: 19 April 1930 (aged 75)
- Education: St John's College, Cambridge
- Spouse: Edith Douglas Palmer (m. 1890; died 1930)
- Children: Francis Stuart, 18th Earl of Moray; Archibald Stuart, 19th Earl of Moray; James Stuart, 1st Viscount Stuart of Findhorn; Lady Hermione Buller
- Parent(s): Edmund Luttrell Stuart; Elizabeth Jackson

Morton Gray Stuart, 17th Earl of Moray (16 April 1855 – 19 April 1930) was a Scottish peer.

== Early life ==
Stuart was born on 16 April 1855. He was the son of the Rev. Edmund Luttrell Stuart and Elizabeth (née Jackson) Stuart. Among his siblings were elder brothers, Edmund Archibald Stuart (who became the 15th Earl of Moray in 1895), and Francis James Stuart (who became the 16th Earl of Moray in 1901).

His paternal grandparents were Hon. Archibald Stuart (second son of the 9th Earl of Moray) and Cornelia Pleydell (a daughter of Edmund Morton Pleydell, MP for Dorchester and Dorset). His maternal grandfather was the Rev. J. L. Jackson.

He graduated from St John's College, Cambridge with a Master of Arts.

== Career ==
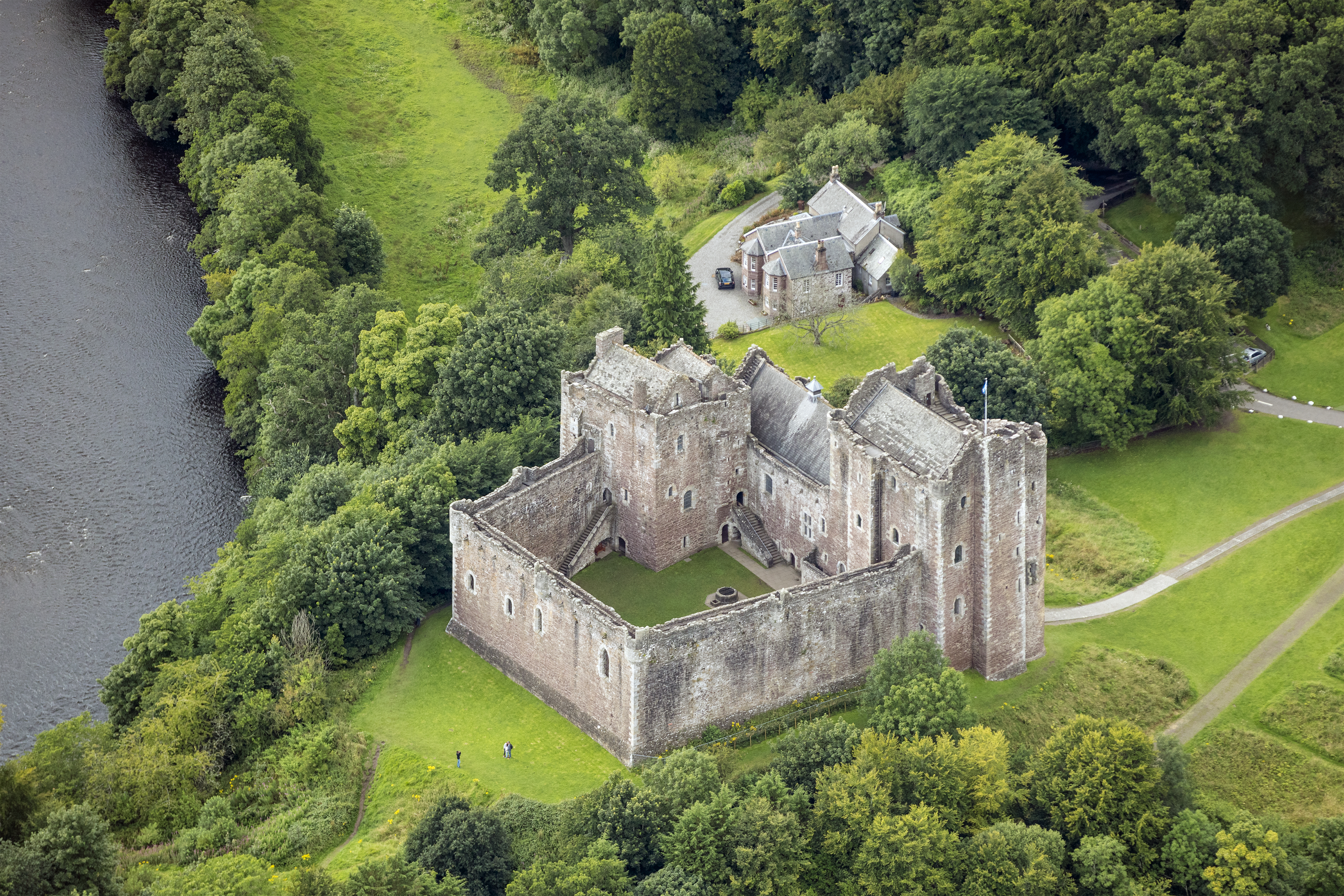
Doune Castle

Upon the death of his elder brother Francis Stuart, 16th Earl of Moray on 20 November 1909, he succeeded as the 17th Earl of Moray (as well as the 9th Baron Stuart of Castle Stuart, the 15th Lord St Colme, 17th Lord Abernethy and Strathearn, the 17th Lord Doune) and inherited Doune Castle, which had been held by the family since 1570.

== Personal life ==
On 17 December 1890, Stuart married Edith Douglas Palmer (c. 1868–1945), daughter of the former Ellen Douglas and Royal Navy Rear-Admiral George Palmer. Together, they were the parents of:

- Francis Douglas Stuart, 18th Earl of Moray (1892–1943), who married Barbara Murray, daughter of John Archibald Murray, in 1924.
- Archibald John Morton Stuart, 19th Earl of Moray (1894–1974), who married Mabel Helen Maud Wilson, daughter of Benjamin Wilson, in 1922. They were the parents of Douglas Stuart, 20th Earl of Moray.
- James Gray Stuart, 1st Viscount Stuart of Findhorn (1897–1971), who married Lady Rachel Cavendish, daughter of Victor Cavendish, 9th Duke of Devonshire and Lady Evelyn Petty-Fitzmaurice (a daughter of the 5th Marquess of Lansdowne), in 1923.
- Lady Hermione Moray Stuart (1899–1989), who married Adm. Sir Henry Tritton Buller, son of Adm. Sir Alexander Buller and Emily Mary Tritton, in 1919.

Lord Moray died on 19 April 1930 at age 75 and was succeeded in the earldom by his eldest son, Francis. As his eldest son died without male issue in 1943, the earldom passed to his second son, Archibald. His widow, the dowager Lady Moray, died on April 1945.

Peerage of Scotland
| Preceded by Francis James Stuart | Earl of Moray; 1909–1930 | Succeeded by Francis Douglas Stuart |
