= Francis Stuart, 7th Earl of Moray =

Scottish noble

Francis Stuart, 7th Earl of Moray (before 1683 – 11 December 1739) was the son of Alexander Stuart, 5th Earl of Moray and his wife, Emilia Balfour. He married Jean Elphinstone, daughter of John Elphinstone, 4th Lord Balmerinoch and Christiana Montgomerie. He succeeded to his brother Charles's titles when he died without a legitimate heir in 1735.

His daughter, Lady Anne Stuart (1703–1783), married John Stewart of Blairhall and is buried at Restalrig churchyard.

Peerage of Scotland
Preceded by Charles Stuart	Earl of Moray; 1735–1739	Succeeded by James Stuart
