= Archibald Campbell, 9th Earl of Argyll =

Scottish politician, soldier, and nobleman (1629–1685)

The Earl of Argyll
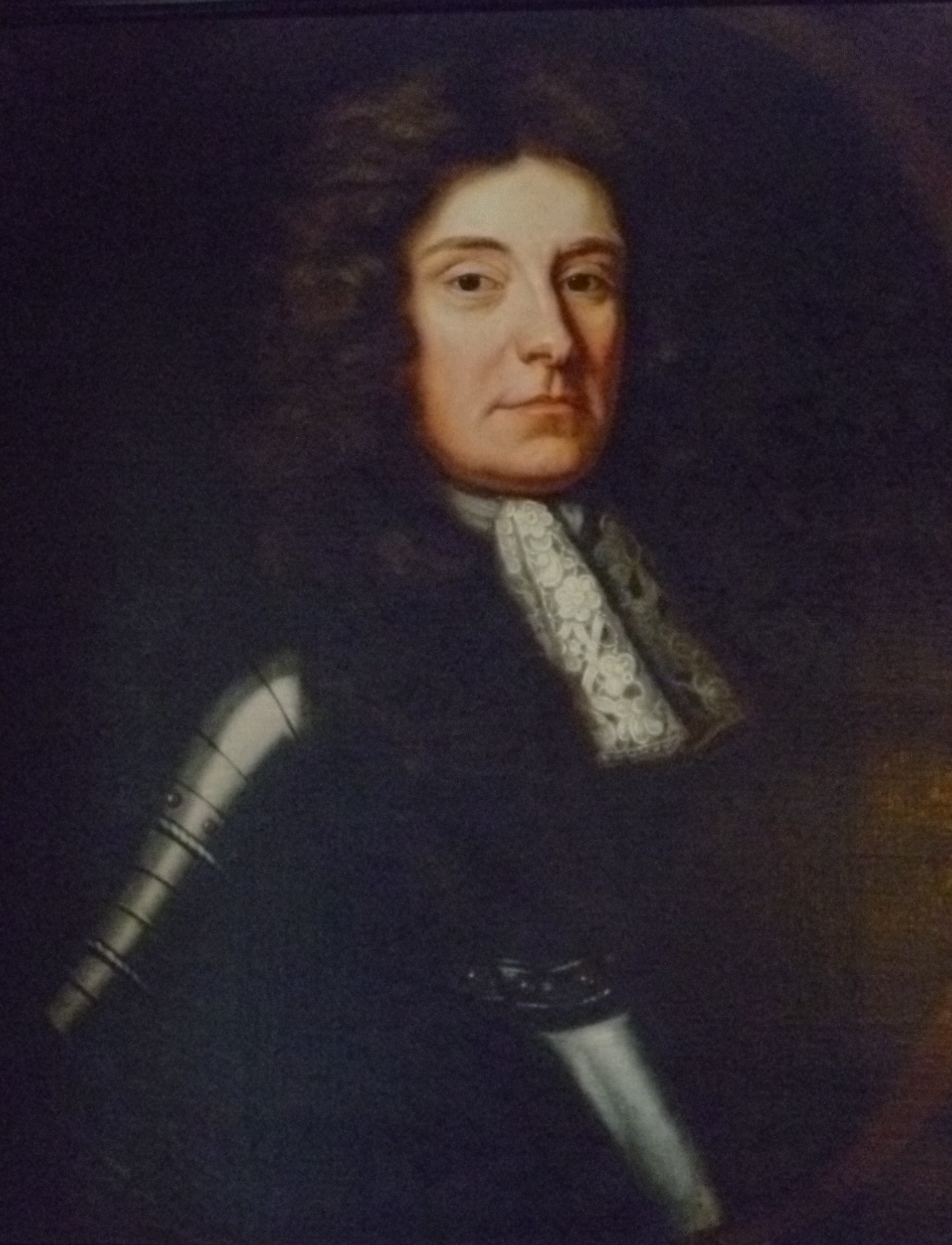
- The Earl of Argyll, portrait from Argyll's Lodging.
- Born: 26 February 1629; Dalkeith, Kingdom of Scotland
- Died: 30 June 1685 (aged 56); Edinburgh, Kingdom of Scotland
- Cause of death: Execution by beheading
- Resting place: Kilmun Parish Church
- Education: University of Glasgow
- Occupations: Chief of Clan Campbell, military officer, politician
- Title: 9th Earl of Argyll, member of the Privy Council of Scotland
- Spouses: Lady Mary Stuart; Lady Anna Mackenzie
- Children: Archibald Campbell, 1st Duke of Argyll; John Campbell of Mamore another two sons and three daughters
- Parent(s): Archibald Campbell, 1st Marquess of Argyll; Lady Margaret Douglas

Archibald Campbell, 9th Earl of Argyll (26 February 1629 – 30 June 1685) was a Scottish peer and soldier.

The hereditary chief of Clan Campbell, and a prominent figure in Scottish politics, he was a Royalist supporter during the latter stages of the Scottish Civil War and its aftermath. During the period of the Cromwellian Protectorate he was involved in several Royalist uprisings and was for a time imprisoned.

Despite his previous loyalty, after the Restoration of Charles II, Argyll fell under suspicion due to his hereditary judicial powers in the Highlands and his strong Presbyterian religious sympathies. Condemned to death in 1681 on a highly dubious charge of treason and libel, he escaped from prison and fled into exile, where he began associating with Whig opponents of the Stuart regime. Following the accession of Charles' brother to the throne as James II in 1685, Argyll returned to Scotland in an attempt to depose James, organised in parallel with the Monmouth Rebellion. Argyll's Rising failed, and Argyll was captured and beheaded.

== Early life ==
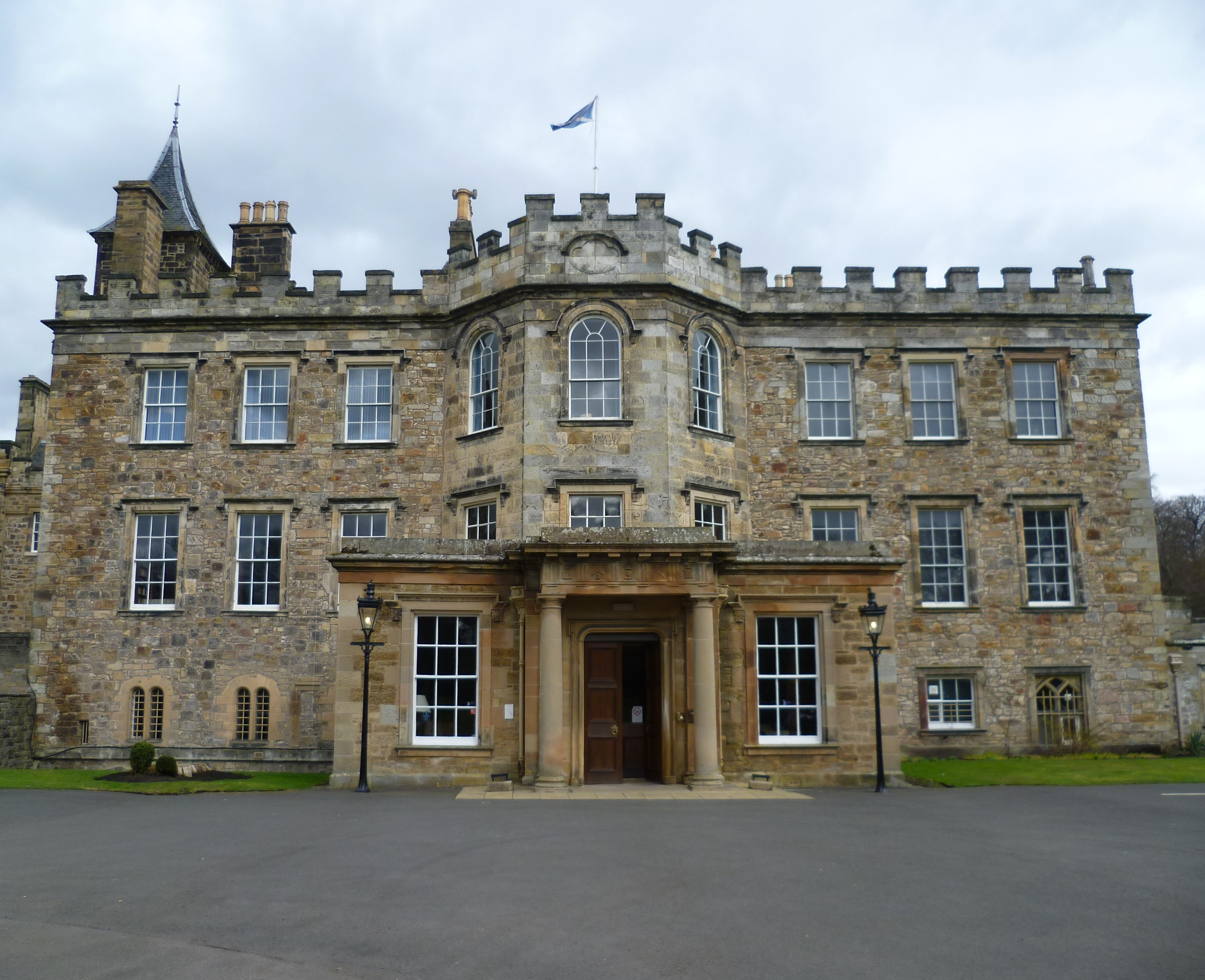
Argyll's birthplace: Newbattle Abbey, Dalkeith.

He was born in 1629 in Dalkeith, Scotland, the eldest son of Archibald Campbell, 1st Marquess of Argyll, and Lady Margaret Douglas, the daughter of William Douglas, 7th Earl of Morton.

At the age of four, an agreement was made, in accordance with a custom common amongst the Scottish nobility of the time, for young Archibald to be fostered with Colin Campbell of Glenorchy, one of his father's kinsmen. At his parents' insistence he was raised bilingually in English and Gaelic. He enrolled at Glasgow University in 1643, and between 1647 and 1649, his father sent him to travel in France and Italy, mainly to protect him from the political upheavals taking place in Scotland at the time. His father, as one of the most powerful nobles in Scotland, became heavily involved in the politics of the Wars of the Three Kingdoms, emerging as the leader of the Presbyterian Covenanter party and as the de facto head of the Scottish government for much of the period.

While still on the Continent, young Archibald heard the news of the execution of King Charles I, and wrote to Queen Henrietta Maria assuring her of his loyalty to the Stuart dynasty. In the letter he also reiterated his father's loyalty, and defended him against accusations that he had approved of Charles's trial and execution, but added that he would serve the King even against his father, if the latter really meant otherwise than he professed.

== 1650s ==
In 1650, after his return to Scotland, Lorne married Mary, the daughter of James Stuart, 4th Earl of Moray: the same year he was appointed to the governing Committee of Estates, his first major position of responsibility.

When Charles II was invited to Scotland in 1650 in a brief alliance with the Covenanters against the English Parliament, Lorne was made captain of His Majesty's Foot Guards, appointed by the Scottish parliament to attend on the king's person. At the time Charles was chafing under the social restraints laid upon him by the Presbyterian clergy, but Lorne obtained favour with him by bringing him people he wished to see. Lorne was present with his regiment at the Battle of Dunbar on 3 September 1650, where his regiment was nearly wiped out.

=== Glencairn's Rising ===
After Worcester, in the winter of 1653, Lorne joined William Cunningham, 9th Earl of Glencairn, who was in arms in the Highlands with a Royalist force of 700 soldiers and 200 horses. Lorne's father, who had attempted to make peace with Cromwell's regime, warned him against becoming involved, leading to an estrangement. It has since been suspected that the political differences between Lorne and his father were exaggerated by the family in order to ensure they would prosper whichever political side won out, though Lorne's biographer John Willcock felt that his Royalist sympathies were entirely genuine.

Glencairn's irregular forces prepared to invade the Lowlands, but efforts were hampered by constant quarrels between Glencairn's junior commanders. Lorne and Glengarry fell out to the point of drawing swords on each other and remained at odds. Glencairn, for his part, distrusted Lorne. When Lorne and the Viscount of Kenmure went in joint command of a force to suppress the Kintyre remonstrants (radical Presbyterians who disapproved of the moderates' engagement with Charles) Kenmure thought that Lorne treated them too leniently, and complained to Glencairn. In March Lorne argued with James Graham, 2nd Marquess of Montrose, and came close to being killed.

Shortly afterwards, Lorne had a final argument with Glencairn over who had authority over Lorne's own tenants. Lorne refused to give precedence to Glencairn and took his own troops across a nearby river. For the rest of the day Glencairn feared an open battle, but the next night Lorne left his men and departed with only a few officers. The reason for this, according to Baillie, was that a letter from Lorne to the King had been intercepted in which he complained of Glencairn's behaviour, and Glencairn had ordered Glengarry to arrest him. A correspondent of John Thurloe reported a version of events more discreditable to Lorne: that the intercepted letter was written to the general of the English forces, suggesting a plan for attacking Glencairn's men.

=== Activities against the Commonwealth ===
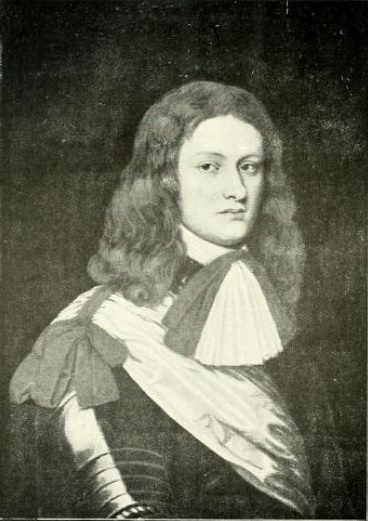
Portrait of Archibald Campbell, Lord Lorne, by unknown artist, formerly in collection of the Earl of Balcarres.

In May 1654, Cromwell published his Ordinance of Pardon and Grace to the People of Scotland, offering a general pardon for acts during the conflict. Lorne was, however, among the numerous exceptions to the pardon. In June he was reported as being reconciled with his father, Argyll, and as helping him to raise men for the English. The report was probably wrong, as in September he managed to capture a vessel loaded with provisions for Argyll's men.

Later in 1654, Lorne is thought to have joined John Middleton's attempted insurrection, and by November he and his men were raiding his father's lands for cattle to feed Middleton's troops. Argyll was eventually compelled to ask for an English garrison to protect him from his son. By the beginning of December, however, Lorne had to retire to a small island with only four or five men, and on 16 December George Monck wrote to Cromwell that Lorne was to meet his father and would probably come over to the Protector if allowed. Lorne, however, informed Argyll that he could not capitulate without Middleton's formal approval. Lorne was clearly still in communication with Charles, as in December the latter wrote to Lorne from his exile in Cologne, thanking him for his constancy to Middleton in all his distresses, acknowledging his service to the Royalist cause, and promising future rewards.

On 31 March, Lorne eventually received instructions from Charles, through Middleton, in which he was urged to lose no time in taking such a course, by capitulation or otherwise, as he should judge "most fit and expedient to save his person, family, and estate." He is spoken of as having been "principallie engaged in the enlyvening of the war, and one of the chief movers;" and his "deportments in relation to the enemy and the last war are beyond all paralell". Another letter to the same effect from Middleton reached him in April, dated from Paris, in which he is similarly praised. Both of these letters were produced at his trial in 1681, in an attempt to reaffirm his history of loyalty to Charles.

Later in 1655, probably in May, conditions for Lorne's surrender were drawn up and finally received Cromwell's approval in August. These were that Lorne and the heads of clans serving him should come in within three weeks; that he should give security for £5,000, his officers and vassals giving proportional security; that Lorne should have liberty to march with his horses and arms (the horses to be sold in three weeks); and that he and his party should enjoy their estates without molestation, and should be freed from all fines or forfeiture. By 8 November the arrangement had been formalised and garrisons were left at Lochaber and Dunstaffnage to ensure Lorne's promises were kept.

Despite his surrender, Lorne was carefully watched by Lord Broghill, who bribed his servants, and who sent accounts of his movements to Cromwell's spymaster John Thurloe. On 20 November Broghill urged Lorne's arrest purely in order that enemies more dangerous at the time might think themselves unobserved. By the following January, however, Lorne had again declared for Charles Stuart, and had taken the island and garrison of Mull. On 8 January, Thurloe was notified that Lorne had a meeting of all his friends (probably to organise his debts, which were substantial). Lorne came to a reconciliation with his father in late March: the latter brokered further agreements with the English Protectorate – of which one was that he or Lorne, whichever the parliament might direct, should go to England whenever desired, provided they had freedom within a compass of twenty miles, and leave to have audience of the council whenever they wished.

=== Arrest, imprisonment and head injury ===
Despite his capitulation, Lorne was still regarded with great suspicion. On 13 May 1656, Broghill reported that he was back in correspondence with Charles, repeating the warning later in the year. Broghill suspected that Lorne had been appointed, with Fairfax, to head another Scottish revolt. Probably in consequence of Broghill's information, a new oath was imposed upon the Scottish nobility at the beginning of 1657, whereby they were compelled to swear their renunciation of the Stuarts, and their adherence to the Protectorate. Lorne refused the oath and was immediately imprisoned in Edinburgh castle. In August 1657, Broghill urged that he and Glencairn, as the two most dangerous persons then in Scotland, should be sent to England, where they would have less opportunity for "trinketing".

While Lorne was confined in the castle of Edinburgh a strange accident befell him in March 1658 during a game of "bullets", a form of bowling. It was described by Lamont:

"Being playing at the bullets in the castell, the lieutenant of the castell throwing the bullett, it lighted on a stone, and with such force started back on the Lord Lorne's head that he fell doune, and lay for the space of some houres dead; after that he recovered, and his head was trepanned once or twice."

Lorne recovered slowly and with difficulty from the skull fracture, which in modern times would likely have been diagnosed as a severe concussion, which would explain the nap he took before his execution. Several later historians speculated that some of his erratic behaviour, and occasional fits of temper, in later life, can be explained by it.

The date of his release is not known, but it was probably in March 1659–60, when Lauderdale and the other prisoners taken at Worcester were set free.

== At the Restoration ==
At the 1660 Restoration of Charles II, Lorne went to London and was received kindly by the King. However, when his father, the Marquess, followed him hoping for a reconciliation with Charles he was arrested: as a result of his role in the Civil War, he was executed in May 1661 for treason and his estates forfeit. Despite Lorne's history of loyalty to Charles, he had powerful enemies at Court, and fifteen months after his father's death, was himself threatened with beheading over a charge of "leasing making" (a form of libel). Charles however requested that the sentence be postponed: several months later, Lorne was released, and his grandfather's title and estates were restored to him in October 1663. He was elected a Fellow of the Royal Society in October 1663.

== Earl of Argyll ==
Although he had finally regained the title of Earl and much of his inheritance, Argyll's affairs were still encumbered by debt. His harsh treatment of his own debtors and apparently unscrupulous use of his hereditary and other offices gave him a poor reputation amongst some contemporaries. He was also involved in ongoing litigation with Montrose, although they were reconciled by February 1667. Montrose visited Argyll at Inveraray in August, and in March 1669, Argyll travelled to Perthshire from Inveraray to attend his funeral, becoming guardian to his son.

On 29 April 1664, Argyll was placed on the Scottish Privy Council. During 1664 and 1665, he was regarded as one of the chief members of John Maitland, 1st Duke of Lauderdale's party, Lauderdale being godfather to one of his children.

During the mid-1660s, Argyll remained for the most part at Inveraray Castle, exercising his hereditary office of grand justiciar of the highlands, and mediating between highland chiefs. He devoted a great deal of attention to planning the gardens at Inveraray, and was particularly interested in tree raising and planting, seeking advice from John Evelyn on the subject. His plan was to stock the gardens themselves with fruit trees, and to thickly plant ornamental trees around so that the house had the appearance of rising out of a wood: he had a particular fondness for elms. He also devoted time to the production of salt herrings and distilling whisky, hoping to create an export trade to England, and sent samples of his products both to Lauderdale and to Charles II.

Although Argyll had some involvement in the religious disputes of the period, acting to disarm the Covenanters in Kintyre, he was regarded as one of the moderates on the Privy Council. There remained opponents amongst the other council members, particularly James Sharp, the Archbishop of St Andrews. This opposition to Argyll surfaced in an attempt to challenge his formal restoration to his hereditary offices in October 1666. It again appeared when the Pentland Rising took place: Sharp would not allow Argyll's forces to participate, fearing that he and his men would join the rebels. After their rout the leaders of the rebels tried to reach the west coast to cross over to Ireland, and on 14 December, Argyll received instructions from the Privy Council to capture them if possible.

In 1667, Argyll received a new charter of all his lands and hereditary and other offices from Charles II. On 3 August, he was appointed, with Atholl and Seaforth, to have the oversight of the Highlands, which were then in a disturbed state. He was still on good terms with Lauderdale and backed him against the other main party on the Privy Council, headed by the 7th Earl of Rothes: in September he wrote to Lauderdale urging him to secure Rothes's resignation of the commissionership.

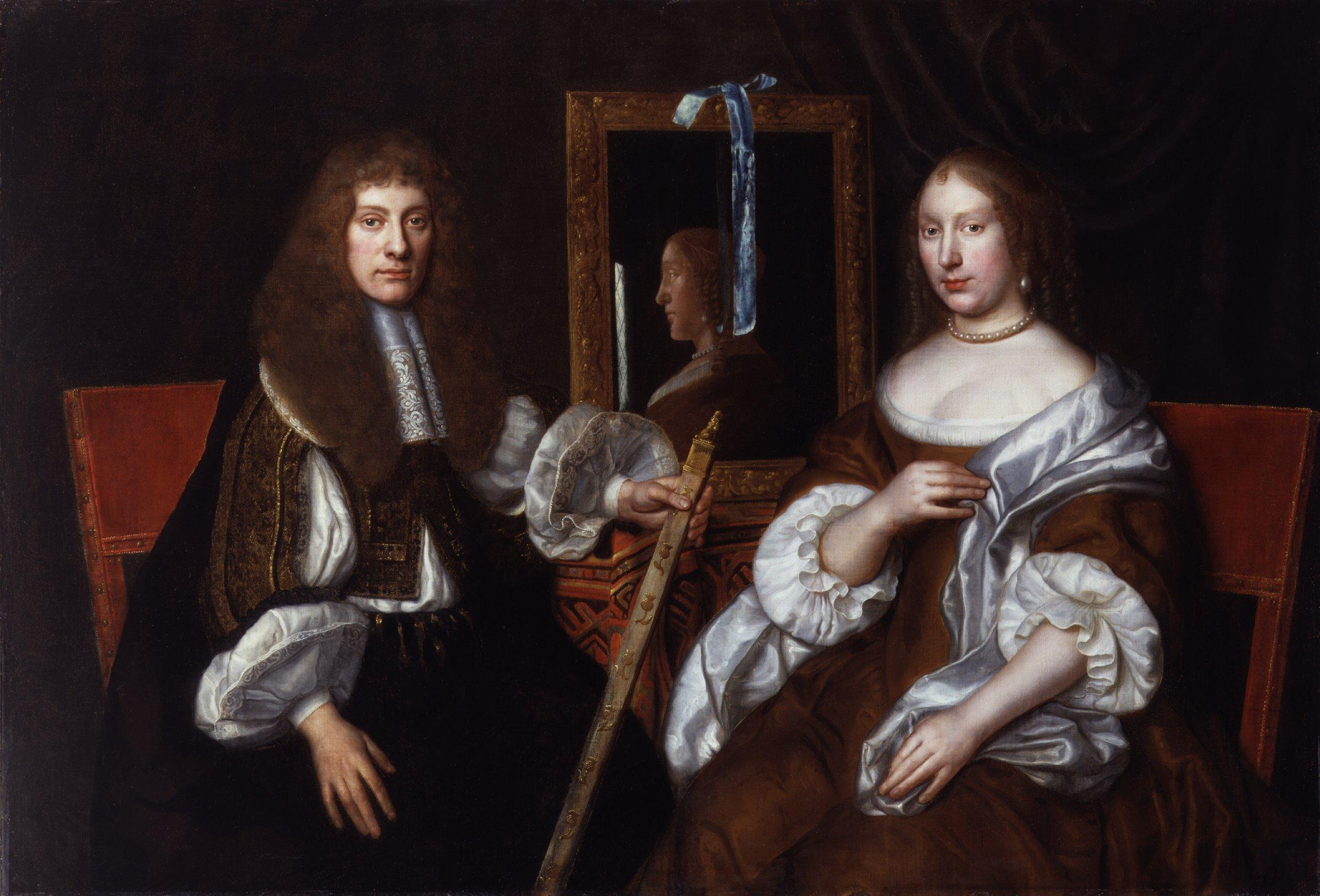
Archibald Campbell, 9th Earl of Argyll, with his second wife Anna.

In May 1668, Argyll's wife died; his personal letters at the time describe his feelings of desolation at her death. In October 1669, Lauderdale visited Scotland as high commissioner. Argyll was aware that Elizabeth Murray, Lady Dysart, who was shortly to become Lauderdale's second wife, was using her influence against him, and made a point of personally attending Lauderdale at Berwick. At the opening of the Scottish Parliament, he carried the sceptre. One of the issues debated by this parliament was to formally ratify the reversal of Argyll's father's forfeiture. This was opposed by the 11th Earl of Erroll and other of Argyll's creditors, but Lauderdale pushed the ratification through by deciding it was not to be voted on and a matter for the King alone to decide.

On 28 January 1670, Argyll married for the second time, to Lady Anna Mackenzie, dowager Lady Balcarres. This caused a brief souring of his relationship with Lauderdale, who thought that his godson, the young earl, would be adversely affected by the marriage.

Argyll was opposed to further persecution of the western Covenanters but was ordered by the privy council to suppress the conventicles in his jurisdiction. On 11 July 1674, he was made an extraordinary lord of session. He had in May been made a member of the committee for public affairs appointed to put down conventicles; in 1677, he was still supporting moderate measures.

He quietly rebuilt his alliance with Lauderdale, and the daughter of the second Duchess of Lauderdale married his eldest son, Lord Lorne. On 10 October 1678, he received a commission to seize, with the aid of three companies, the Isle of Mull, where a vicious turf war had been going on between Argyll and the McLeans since 1674. It took until 1680 for him to gain possession.

== Downfall ==
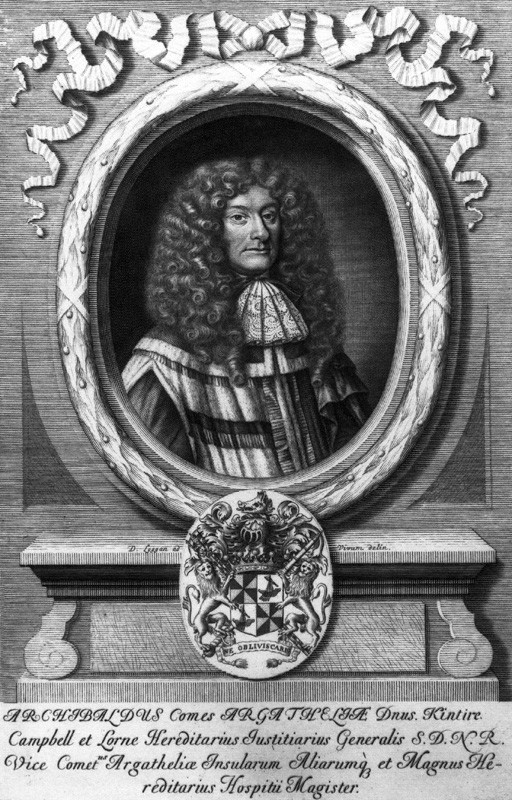
The 9th Earl of Argyll, engraving "from life" of c.1680 by David Loggan

On 12 April 1679, in consequence of the Popish Plot allegations in England, Argyll received a special commission to secure the Highlands and to disarm all Catholics, particularly the Macleans and Macdonalds. He initially wrote requesting the aid of regular troops to assist his clansmen, and received assistance from the Sheriffs of Dumbarton and Bute, as well as "twelvehundredweight of powder". However, in the interim severe disorder broke out amongst the Covenanters of southern Scotland following their assassination of Argyll's old opponent Archbishop Sharp, culminating in an effective open rebellion and the Battle of Drumclog. Given Argyll's previous moderate treatment of the Covenanters, the Privy Council debated cancelling his commission and he was ordered to report with as many men as he could raise to the camp of the Earl of Linlithgow, the Commander-in-Chief of the Royal forces.

By this point, Argyll was in a difficult position: not only did his Presbyterian sympathies (not to mention those of his late father) make him suspect to the Court party, but his heritable jurisdictions and personal power in the west of Scotland, as the head of Clan Campbell, made him a constant threat to the King's authority. Matters came to a head when in 1680, James, Duke of York replaced Lauderdale as High Commissioner in Scotland. A parliament was held in 1681, Argyll bearing the crown at the opening on 13 August. James told Argyll that the king thought him an over-mighty subject: Argyll, finding himself isolated, assured James of his loyalty, and signed a letter of the council to Charles confirming the divine right of kings. The same month, James paid a solemn visit of ceremony to Argyll at Stirling, and directly asked him if he would convert to Catholicism, promising him great influence in Scotland if he did. Argyll, however, reiterated his dedication to Protestantism, a statement received coldly by James.

The 1681 parliament passed a Scottish Test Act, the "Act anent Religion and the Test". Like other Test Acts, this contained a declaration of adherence to Protestantism, with an added oath of allegiance to the King's authority, to be taken by persons in office. Argyll complained about the substance of the Act, noting its internal contradictions in that it upheld Presbyterianism while committing subjects to follow the monarch's authority in religion, and concerned that the Royal Family themselves – given their Catholic leanings – were not obliged to take it. He then prevaricated over taking the test himself, despite being warned that his earlier complaints had put him in a dangerous position. Eventually, he took the oath, but added the caveat "only in as far as it is consistent with itself". Argyll seems to have been under the belief that this qualified version of the oath had been cleared with the Duke of York, but it was enough for an exasperated James, backed by Argyll's enemies, to have him arrested on 9 November and charged with treason, assuming the legislative power, perjury, and the old Scottish capital offence of "leasing making" (i.e. libelling the king, his family, or court, with the intention of sowing dissension between the king and his subjects).

Argyll was put on trial, on 12 December 1681, before Queensberry and four other judges. After Lockhart's defence the court adjourned; the question of fact was next day brought before a jury composed mainly of Argyll's enemies; Montrose, his hereditary foe, sat in court as chancellor. Argyll refused to defend himself. The jury acquitted him of perjury in receiving the oath in a false acceptation, and agreed with the judges on the other counts. Application was made to Charles for instructions by the council, and for justice by Argyll. Public opinion in both England and Scotland was outraged by Argyll's treatment, and blame was attached to the Duke of York in particular. George Savile, 1st Marquess of Halifax told Charles that in England they would not "hang a dog" on the pretext under which Argyll had been sentenced in Scotland. It was given out – at least by pro-Royal sources – that Charles and James were merely hoping to ensure Argyll was humbled and stripped of his judicial powers, rather than actually executed.

On 22 December, the king's letter reached the council; and, questionably, sentence of death as well as of forfeiture was pronounced in Argyll's absence on the 23rd. His estates were confiscated, and his hereditary jurisdictions assigned to Atholl.

== Escape and exile ==
At the end of 1681, Argyll was in Edinburgh Castle, under expectation of imminent death. On 20 December, however, his stepdaughter Sophia Lindsay obtained leave to visit him; she brought with her a countryman as a page, dressed in a wig and with his head bound up as if he had been in a fight. He and Argyll exchanged clothes, and remarkably the ruse proved successful.

Lindsay left the castle in floods of tears, accompanied by Argyll. Some of the guards almost discovered the disguise at the last minute, but were successfully distracted, and at the gate Argyll stepped up behind the coach. On reaching the customhouse, he slipped quietly off into one of the narrow wynds adjacent. He first went to the house of George Pringle of Torwoodlee, who had arranged for the escape, and by him was conducted to William Veitch, in Northumberland, who in turn brought him, travelling under the name "Mr. Hope", to London.

In London, Argyll was sheltered by Ann Smith, wife of a rich sugar-baker. He also found refuge with Major Abraham Holmes, who had arrested him in 1656–7. After a delay of some time, Smith took him to her country house at Brentford. No real steps were taken to recapture him, and his subsequent movements are opaque. In 1682, he was supposed to be in Switzerland, but Arthur Forbes, 1st Earl of Granard received a message from him in London, and held a meeting with him. Charles II is also supposed to have been informed of his whereabouts, but refused to have him arrested, ostensibly for reasons of sympathy but perhaps also as arresting such a prominent Protestant would have been hugely unpopular.

During this period, Argyll seems to have begun associating with enemies of the Stuart regime, despite his earlier loyalism. He became a central figure in the clandestine Whig circles centred on the Earl of Shaftesbury. In the autumn of 1682 the government received information that he was involved in treasonable activities: efforts to locate him were renewed, and he fled to Holland, where many Whig exiles were gathering.

=== Involvement in Rye House Plot ===
In June 1683, Baillie of Jerviswood and a number of others were arrested after the discovery of the Rye House Plot to assassinate Charles and his brother. Among their papers, letters from Argyll in cipher were found. The letters were sent to Scotland, and the countess was summoned in December 1683 to decipher them. She admitted that they were in Argyll's writing but claimed she had burnt the only key she had. The cipher was, however, at length read by William Spence, Argyll's private secretary, and independently by two cryptographers, George Campbell and Gray of Crigie. Argyll, it appeared, had remonstrated with other Whig conspirators about their rejection of his proposal that he should be provided with £30,000 and 1,000 English horse. They offered £10,000 with 600 or 700 horse, the money to be paid by the beginning of July, and Argyll was then to go at once to Scotland and begin a revolt. He gave an account of the standing forces, militia, and heritors of Scotland, who would be obliged to appear for the king, to the number of 50,000. Half of them, he said, would not fight. He also said that his party needed only money and arms, and asked Holmes to communicate fully with his messenger from Holland.

Holmes was himself arrested and examined on 28 June 1683, and from his replies it appeared that Argyll was then in London. In October Preston wrote from Paris, informing Halifax that Argyll had his agents in France, and added his belief that he had, after consultation with his friends in Holland, gone back to Scotland. On 28 and 29 June 1684, Spence was examined before the English privy council, but he said nothing against Argyll. In July, he was sent to Scotland and was tortured; but no more was learnt from him, and he was eventually released. In September 1684, Argyll's charter chest and family papers were found concealed in a tenant's house in Argyllshire. Instructors at Benmore Outdoor Centre maintain that Scots law meant that the forfeit estates could not be transferred without the documents, which were supposedly concealed in the Paper Caves in the hillside adjacent to Loch Eck.

== The "Argyll expedition" ==
=== Planning ===
While in Holland, Argyll had become associated with the Duke of Monmouth. On the news of Charles II's death and the accession of James VII as king, he moved from Friesland to Rotterdam, and was present at a meeting of Scots in Amsterdam on 17 April 1685, at which an immediate invasion of Scotland was decided on. Argyll made great efforts to convince Monmouth of the viability of a joint plan of invasion, claiming he could count on a large number of men from among his tenantry in Scotland, although he was among those who insisted that Monmouth should promise never to declare himself king. He funded the invasion preparations with £7,000 given by his supporter Ann Smith, and £1,000 from John Locke. Argyll sailed from the Vlie on 1 or 2 May 1685 with about 300 men in three small ships, accompanied by Sir Patrick Hume, Sir John Cochrane, Spence, and several other Scots exiles. Two English conspirators, John Ayloffe and Richard Rumbold, also went with Argyll. Monmouth had promised that he would start his own attempt, the Monmouth Rebellion, within a few days, though in the event he did not set sail for several weeks.

=== Landing in Kintyre ===
The expedition was dogged by bad luck and divisions amongst its leadership. They anchored off Orkney on 6 May: Spence went ashore to obtain a pilot, but was arrested, and the authorities were alerted to the invasion. Argyll sailed by the Minch towards the coast of his own country, but was compelled by contrary winds to go to the Sound of Mull. At Tobermory he was delayed three days, and then with three hundred men whom he picked up there he went across to Kintyre, a Covenanter stronghold. At Campbeltown Argyll issued a declaration: James had caused the death of Charles, Monmouth was the rightful heir, and that by him he had been restored to title and estates. He had previously sent his son Charles to raise his former tenants, who since his trial had officially held their tenancies from the King; but very few answered his summons.

The rebels marched to Tarbert, where Argyll sent out a second declaration: he denied the statements of his enemies that he had come for private advantage, and promised to pay both his father's debts and his own. While he seems to have expected widespread support from the Covenanters and their sympathisers, many of the more militant Presbyterians had been angered by Argyll's involvement in the trial and execution of one of their leaders, Donald Cargill, and the majority of men who eventually joined the rebellion were Campbell clansmen. The government had also taken the precaution of stationing large numbers of soldiers and militia in those areas of the country thought to be most likely to be sympathetic to Argyll.

At Tarbert, Argyll was joined by Sir Duncan Campbell with a large body of men. An invasion of Lowland Scotland was settled on by a council of war, but Argyll demurred. At Bute, he was detained for three days, and his forces then marched to Cowal in Argyllshire. After a pointless raid on Greenock, he moved off to Inveraray, but the appearance of two English frigates compelled him to shelter under the castle of Eilean Dearg. He took Ardkinglass castle, but gave up on taking Inveraray, and returned to Eilean Dearg. He then proposed to attack the frigates but was frustrated by a mutiny among his men. The garrison of Eilean Dearg deserted, the king's ships took those of Argyll, with their cannon and ammunition as well as the castle, and Argyll's standard on which was written "For God and Religion, against Poperie, Tyrrannie, Arbitrary Government, and Erastianism".

=== Attempted invasion of the Lowlands ===
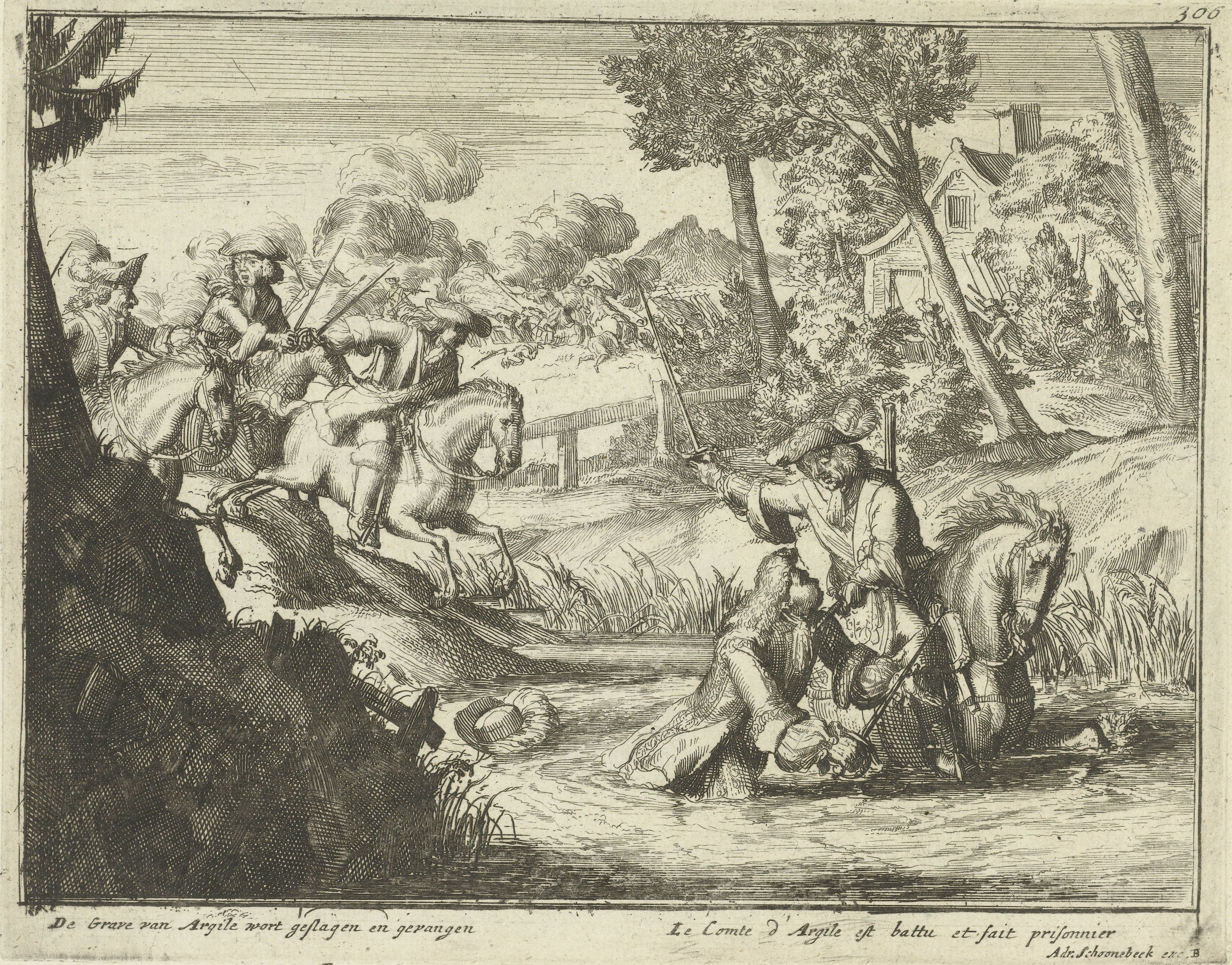
Campbell's capture

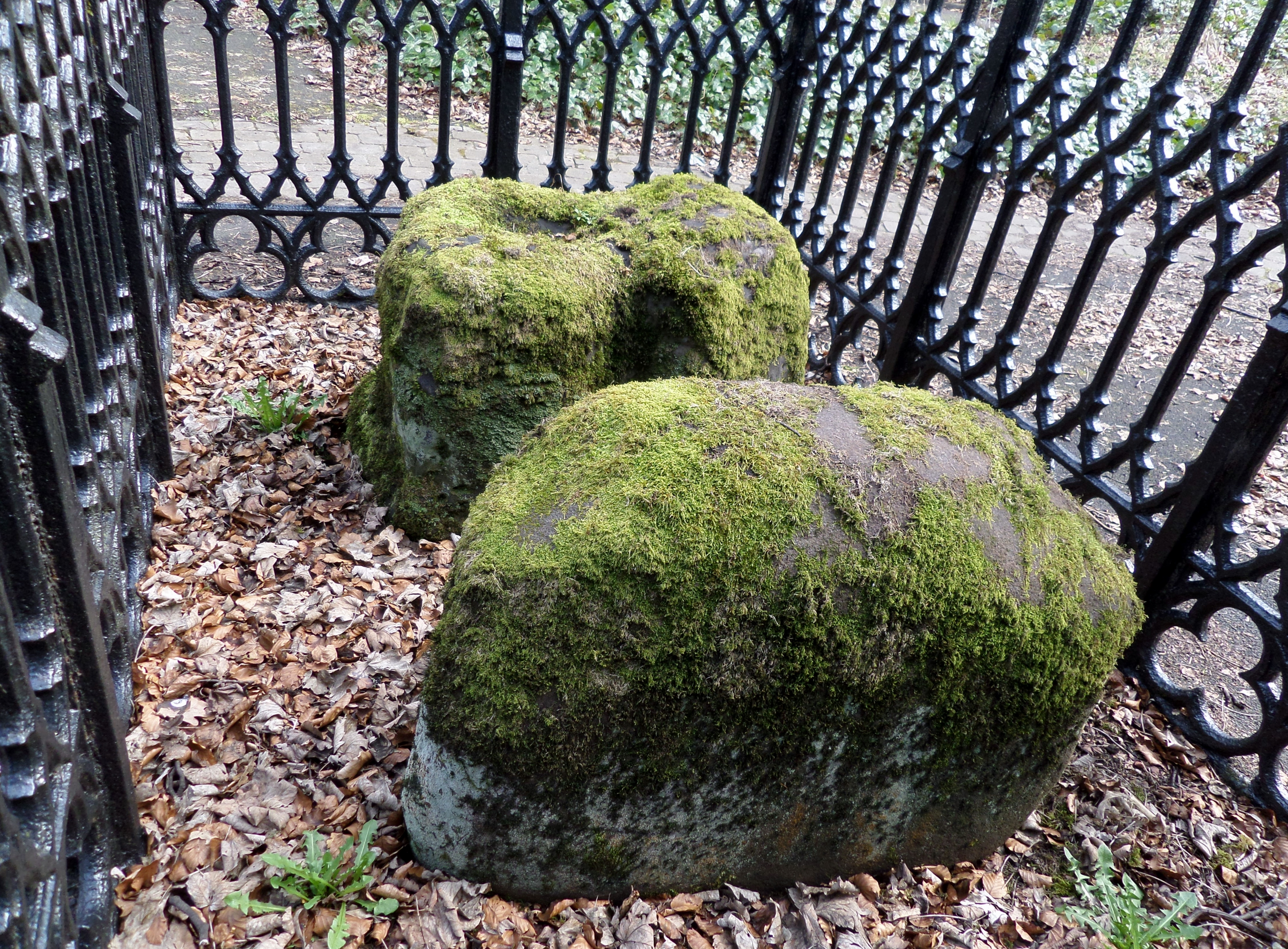
The Argyll Stone (front), said to be where Argyll rested when captured.

In a poor situation, Argyll took up the lowland enterprise. Near Dumbarton, he encamped in an advantageous position in the face of the royal troops; but his proposal to fight was overruled, and the rebels retreated without any engagement towards Glasgow. It crossed to the south side of the River Clyde at Renfrew by Kilpatrick ford, dwindling from two thousand to five hundred men; and after one or two skirmishes with the troops commanded by Rosse and William Cleland, Argyll found himself alone with his son John and three personal friends. To avoid pursuit they separated, only Major Fullarton remaining with Argyll.

Having been refused shelter at the house of an old servant, the two crossed the Clyde to Inchinnan. On 18 June, they were found by a group of militiamen. Argyll was said to have drawn his pistols to fire, but the powder had become damp in the river, and Argyll was struck over the head by one of his captors, a weaver. Heavily disguised in a countryman's bonnet and the full beard he had grown in exile, it was reported (probably apocryphally) that Argyll was only recognised when he cried "Alas, unfortunate Argyll!" as he fell, upon which the militiamen wept when they realised who they had captured, though they were too afraid not to hand him over to the authorities.

He was led first to Renfrew and then to Glasgow. On 20 June, he arrived at Edinburgh, taken to the castle and put in irons. He was questioned before the council as to his associates and threatened with torture. While in prison, he was visited by his sister, Lady Lothian, and by his wife, who, with Sophia Lindsay, had been placed in confinement on the first news of his landing.

== Death ==
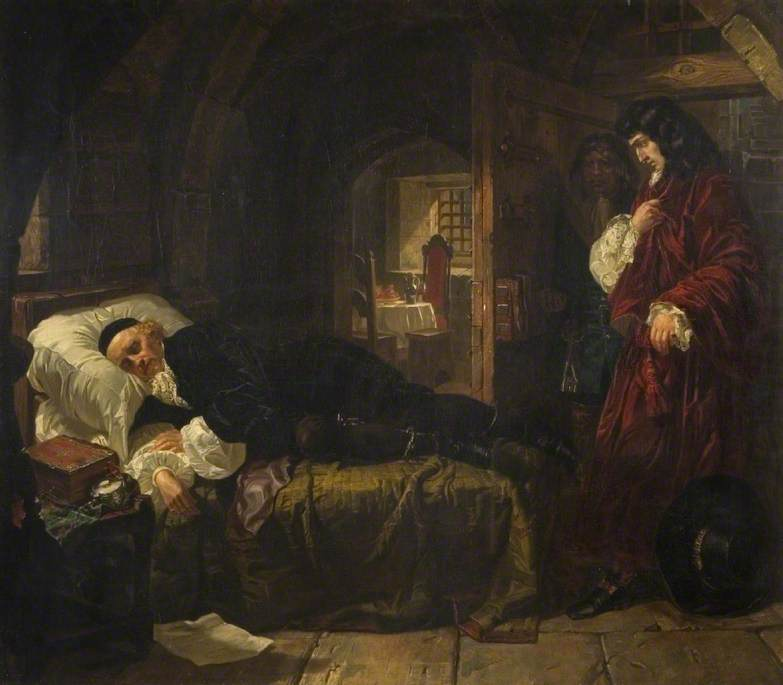
The Last Sleep of the Earl of Argyll, Victorian history painting by Edward Matthew Ward, based on Robert Wodrow's story of Argyll being found sleeping soundly by an official bringing him for execution.

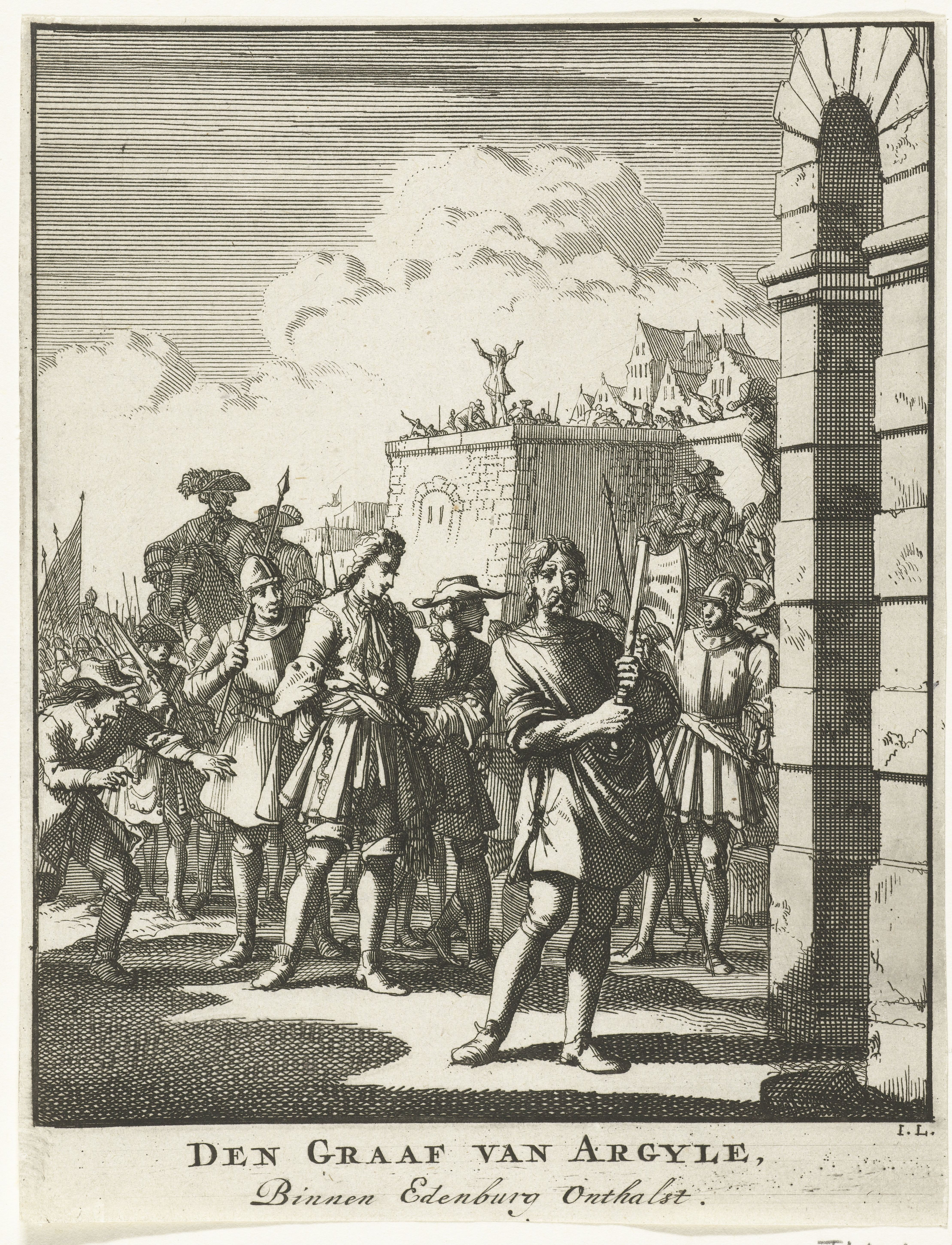
Execution of the Earl

On 30 June 1685, Argyll was executed, like his father, on the maiden in Edinburgh. He had spent much of his time in Holland preparing for a death he anticipated, and he faced his execution with fortitude and good humour. A story was repeated afterwards that an official who came to his room to bring him to execution found him sleeping peacefully, and was filled with remorse in the face of Argyll's calmness (though detractors claimed that following his 1658 head injury he had always had a similar sleep every day). To Sophia Lindsay he wrote: "what shall I say in this great day of the Lord, wherein, in the midst of a cloud, I find a fair sunshine. I can wish no more for you, but that the Lord may comfort you, and shine upon you as he doth upon me, and give you that same sense of His love in staying in the world, as I have in going out of it." On the scaffold he gave a speech reiterating his opposition to "Popery", and finally joked that the guillotine, as his "inlet to glory" was "the sweetest maiden he had ever kissed".

== Character ==
There are few personal descriptions of Argyll, and the polarized political landscape of the time lends itself to widely varying descriptions. John Lauder, Lord Fountainhall said that he was "witty in knacks" (i.e. clever in small inventions) and was "so conceitly" he had about twenty pockets in his coat and breeches. Lauderdale said that he had habits of winking his eye as he spoke and of holding his thumb in the palm of his hand, both of which were supposed to be "ill signs" prophetic of his violent fate. Argyll himself made reference to his own slight build and stature. Napier, the highly partisan pro-Jacobite historian, repeated several derogatory stories of Argyll's character and quoted John Leslie, 1st Duke of Rothes who said of Argyll that ""neither does either his person, or way of converse, recommend him". However, Argyll had, like his father, made many enemies in his lifetime, and other sources give a far more favourable impression of him. Airy noted that Argyll's correspondence on the death of his first wife was "touching", and Andrew Lang wrote that his unpublished private letters showed him to be a "man of singularly affectionate character and tender heart", adding that his conduct at his execution demonstrated great personal bravery.

== Family ==
On 13 May 1650, at the Canongate Kirk, he married Lady Mary Stewart, daughter of the 4th Earl of Moray, with whom he had seven children:

- Archibald Campbell, 1st Duke of Argyll
- John Campbell of Mamore, Commissioner for Argyllshire, and later MP for Dunbartonshire; father of John Campbell, 4th Duke of Argyll
- Charles Campbell, Commissioner for Campbeltown
- James Campbell (c. 1660–1713?)
- Mary Campbell,
- Anne Campbell, married 1st Richard Maitland, 4th Earl of Lauderdale; 2nd, to Charles Stuart, 6th Earl of Moray
- Jean Campbell, married William Kerr, 2nd Marquess of Lothian

He married again, in 1670, the widow Lady Anne Mackenzie, Countess of Balcarres. She survived her husband, being spared execution, and died of old age in 1707.

== See also ==
- Cromwell's Act of Grace

Peerage of Scotland
Preceded by Archibald Campbell	Earl of Argyll; 1663–1685	Succeeded by Archibald Campbell
