= Mary Campbell, Countess of Argyll =

Scottish countess (1628–1668)

Mary Campbell, Countess of Argyll (1628 – May 1668), formerly Lady Mary Stuart (or Stewart), was the wife of Archibald Campbell, 9th Earl of Argyll.

== Career ==
Lady Mary was born at Darnaway Castle, Elginshire, a daughter of James Stuart, 4th Earl of Moray, and his wife Margaret Home. Mary Stuart was the executor of her grandmother the Countess of Home, but renounced her rights on 24 May 1645.

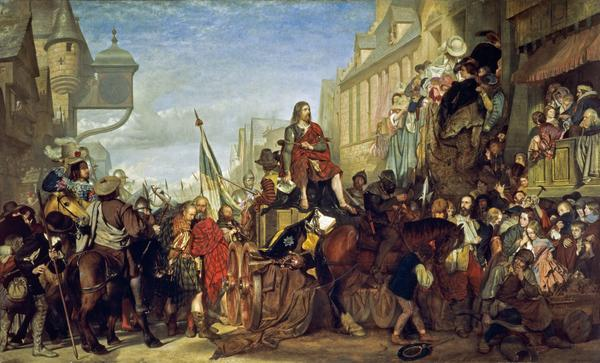
Montrose and the Campbell–Stewart wedding, by James Drummond

On 13 May 1650, she married Archibald Campbell, then known as Lord Lorne, at Canongate, Edinburgh. It is said that the family and Archibald Johnston watched the captive Earl of Montrose being taken up the Royal Mile. Their encounter was depicted in 1859 by the history painter James Drummond.

In 1663, Lord Lorne regained the title and estates which his father had lost when he was convicted of treason and executed in 1661. Lorne became Earl of Argyll, and his wife became countess.

In January 1667, the Earl of Argyll was concerned about the behaviour of two of Mary's brothers, Archibald and Francis Stuart. At the same time, her mother, Margaret Home, Countess of Moray, complained that Alexander Brodie, and Mary and Argyll, had worked together against her financial interests.

The countess's death in 1668 left her husband in despair, as his private letters testify. Her uncle, John Maitland, 1st Duke of Lauderdale, also recorded his distress and that of his wife.

Two years after her death, the earl married Anna Mackenzie. In 1685 he was executed for instigating a rising against King James VII of Scotland on behalf of the Protestant claimant James, Duke of Monmouth.

== Children ==
Their children were:

- Archibald Campbell, 1st Duke of Argyll (1658-1703)
- John Campbell of Mamore (c.1660-1729), Commissioner for Argyllshire, and later MP for Dunbartonshire, who married Elizabeth Elphinstone and had children
- Charles Campbell, Commissioner for Campbeltown, who married twice: first, to Sophia Lindsay and second, to Betty Bowles, and had children
- James Campbell (c.1660–1713?), whose marriage to Mary Wharton was annulled; he subsequently married Margaret Leslie and had children
- Mary Campbell Died as an infant 1657.
- Anne Campbell (died 1734), who was married twice: first to Richard Maitland, 4th Earl of Lauderdale, and second, to Charles Stuart, 6th Earl of Moray, but had no children
- Jean (or Jane) Campbell (died 1712), who married William Kerr, 2nd Marquess of Lothian, and had children
