= Argyll's Lodging =

17th-century town-house in Scotland

Coordinates: 56.1218°N 3.9437°W

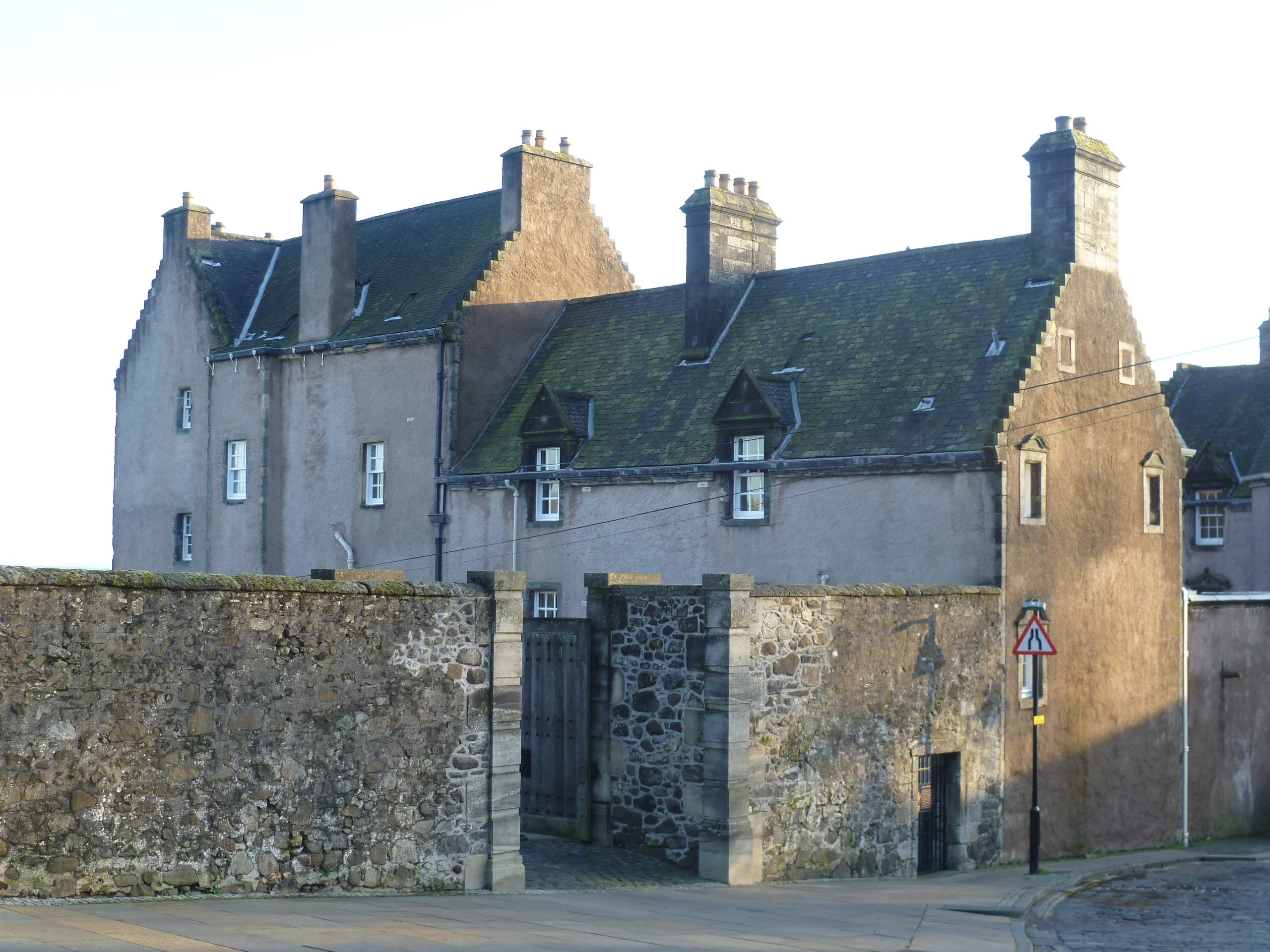
Argyll's Lodging in Castle Wynd

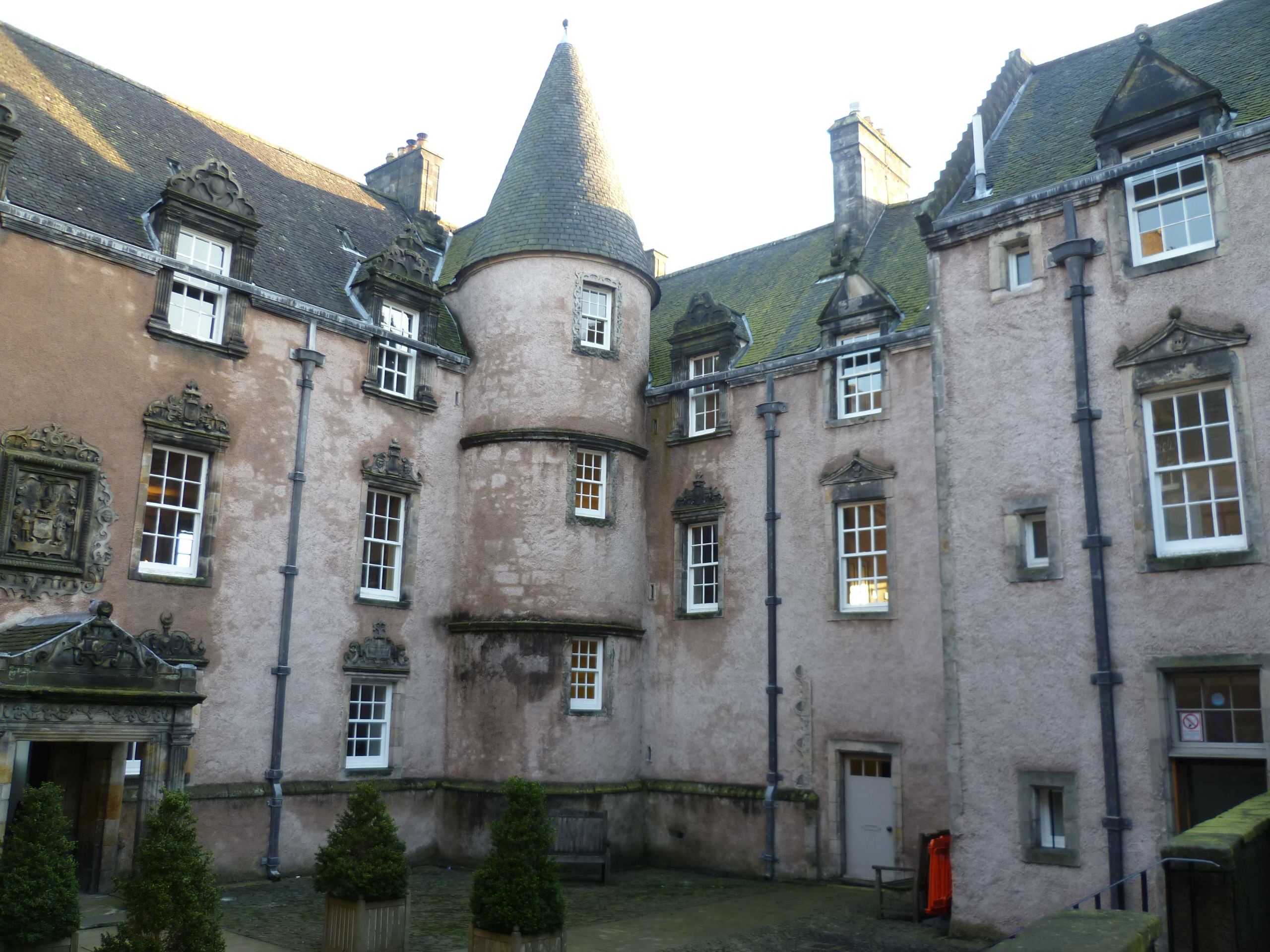

Argyll's Lodging is a 17th-century town-house in the Renaissance style, situated below Stirling Castle in Stirling, Scotland. It was a residence of William Alexander, 1st Earl of Stirling and later the Earls of Argyll. The Royal Commission regards it as “the most important surviving town-house of its period in Scotland”. At the end of the 20th century it became a museum.

== History ==
=== Traill and Erskine ===
It is uncertain who built the first house that developed into the house eventually known as Argyll's Lodging, located in Castle Wynd on the uphill approach to Stirling Castle. It is assumed that the house was built originally by the wealthy merchant John Traill and comprised two storeys with a hall on the first floor and a kitchen on the ground floor. In 1559 Traill sold it to Adam Erskine, the Commendator (lay administrator) of nearby Cambuskenneth Abbey. Erskine converted the dwelling into an L-shaped tower house comprising four floors with a small south wing and west wing, the latter containing the kitchen. In 1604 Erskine sold the house to a relative.

=== Sir William Alexander ===
In 1629 Sir William Alexander, whose family was related to the Campbells of Argyll, bought the house from the Erskines. The house adjoined property of the Campbells who had owned several houses in Stirling since the fourteenth century. Around 1600 their residence stood on the corner of Broad Street and Castle Wynd. Sir William was able to buy the Erskines’ home because he was related to the family, his wife being Janet Erskine.

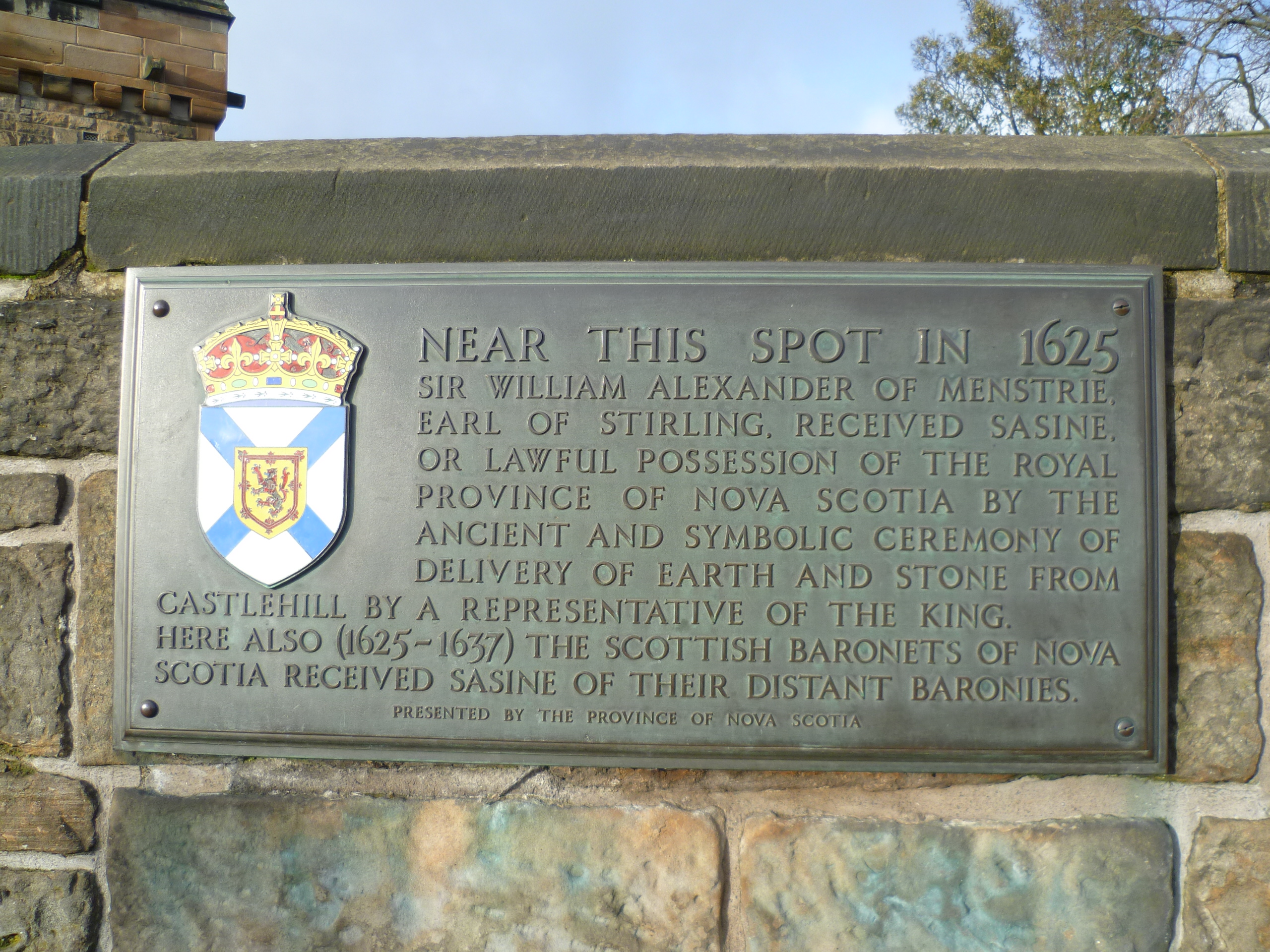
Nova Scotia plaque at Edinburgh Castle.

Sir William was born in 1577 in Menstrie, a village lying a few miles to the north east of Stirling. He was one of several tutors to Prince Henry, heir to the Scottish throne. In 1603, when the crowns of Scotland and England were united, he followed King James VI to London. He was knighted in 1609 and in 1626 was appointed principal Secretary for Scotland for life. He is chiefly remembered today for his settlement of the colony of Nova Scotia in North America under a royal charter granted in 1621. In 1630 he was elevated to 1st Earl of Stirling and Viscount Canada.

Sir William had his Stirling home redecorated when he realised that Charles I was intending to come to Scotland for his Scottish coronation in 1633. He had the house remodeled into a small palace with public and private suites and a grandly decorated exterior. He died insolvent in 1640, leaving the house to his son Charles, but the town of Stirling claimed the property in lieu of his unpaid debts. The town council wanted to furnish it as a guesthouse, but this plan was never realized, and in the 1660s, it was sold to Archibald Campbell, 9th Earl of Argyll.

An armorial tablet on the wall above the main entrance displays Alexander's coat-of-arms. The shield is supported by a Native American and a mermaid. A scroll above displays his family motto Avt Spero Avt Sperno and a scroll below the motto of Nova Scotia per mare per terras. The crest is believed to be the first armorial representation of a beaver.

=== Campbells of Argyll ===
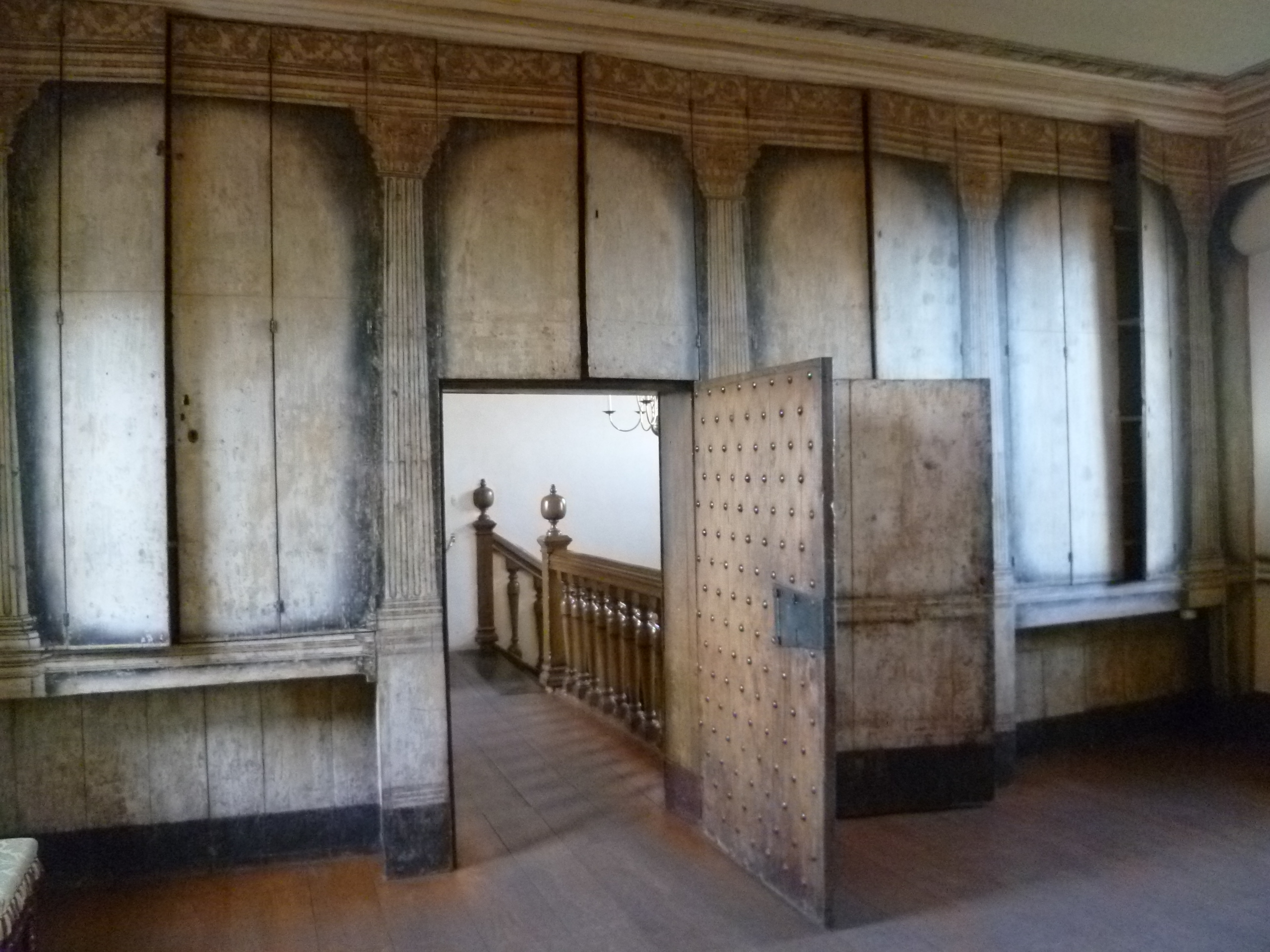
Interior wall decor

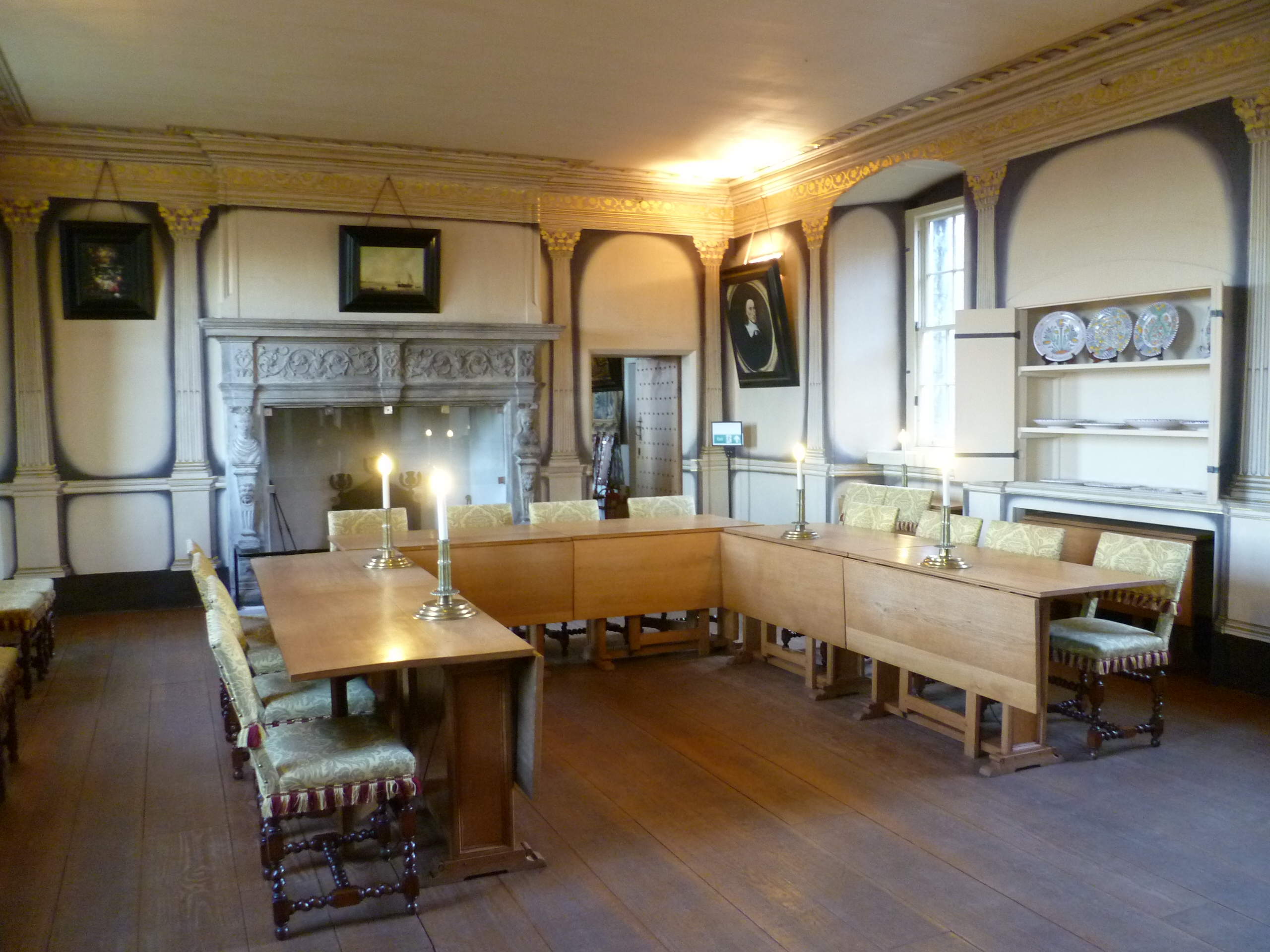
The High Dining Room

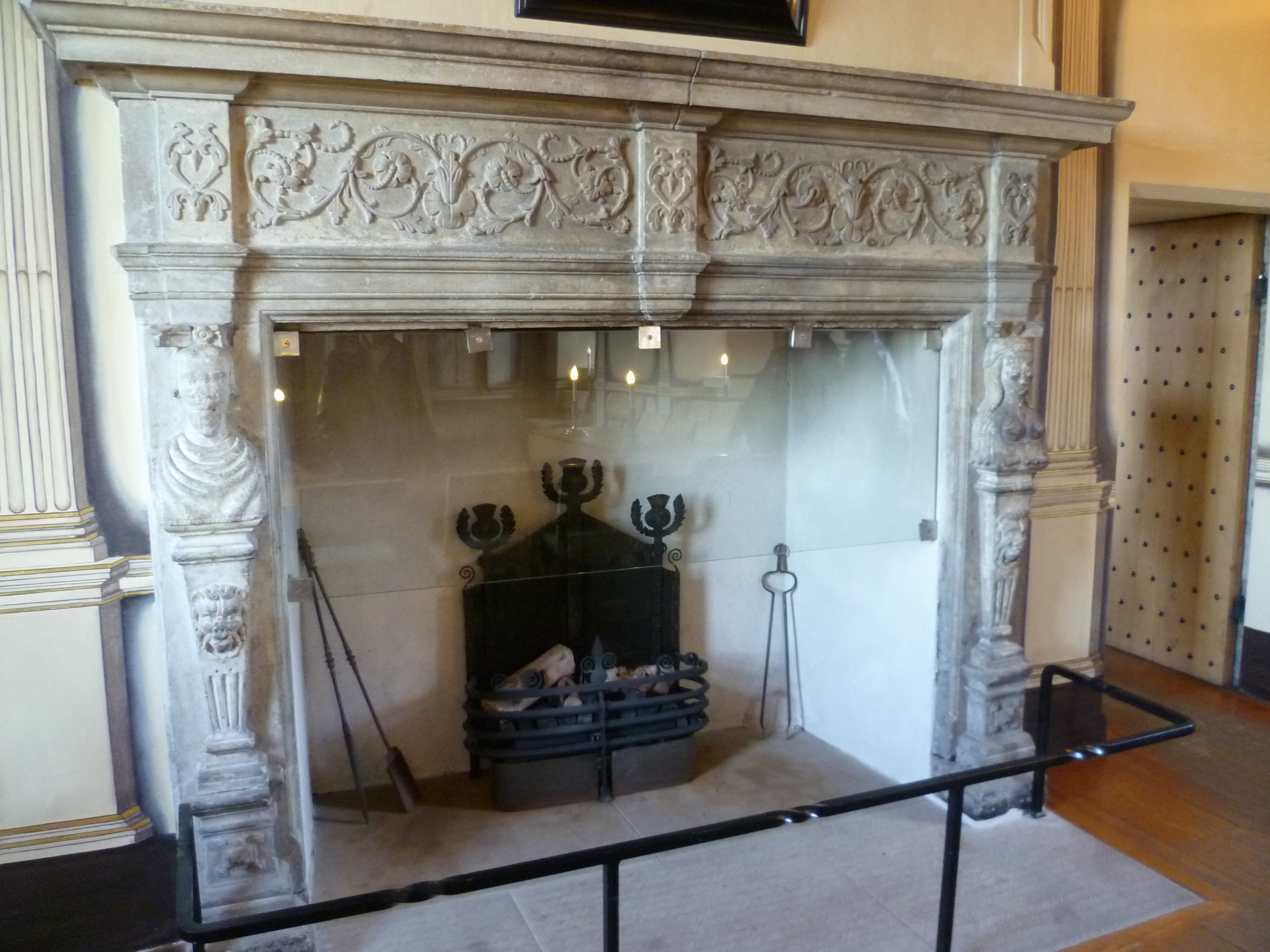
High Dining Room fireplace from the 1630s

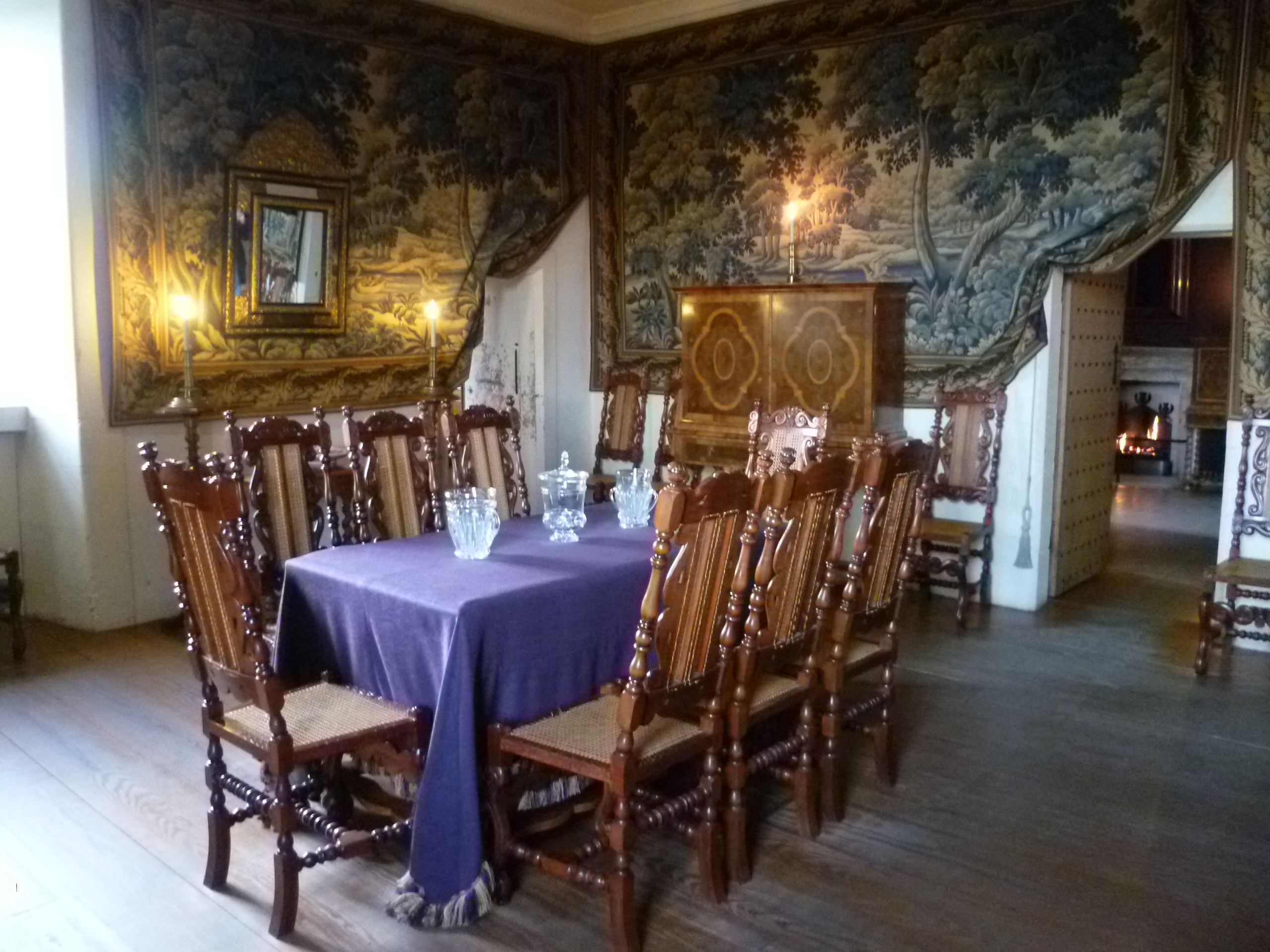
The Drawing Room

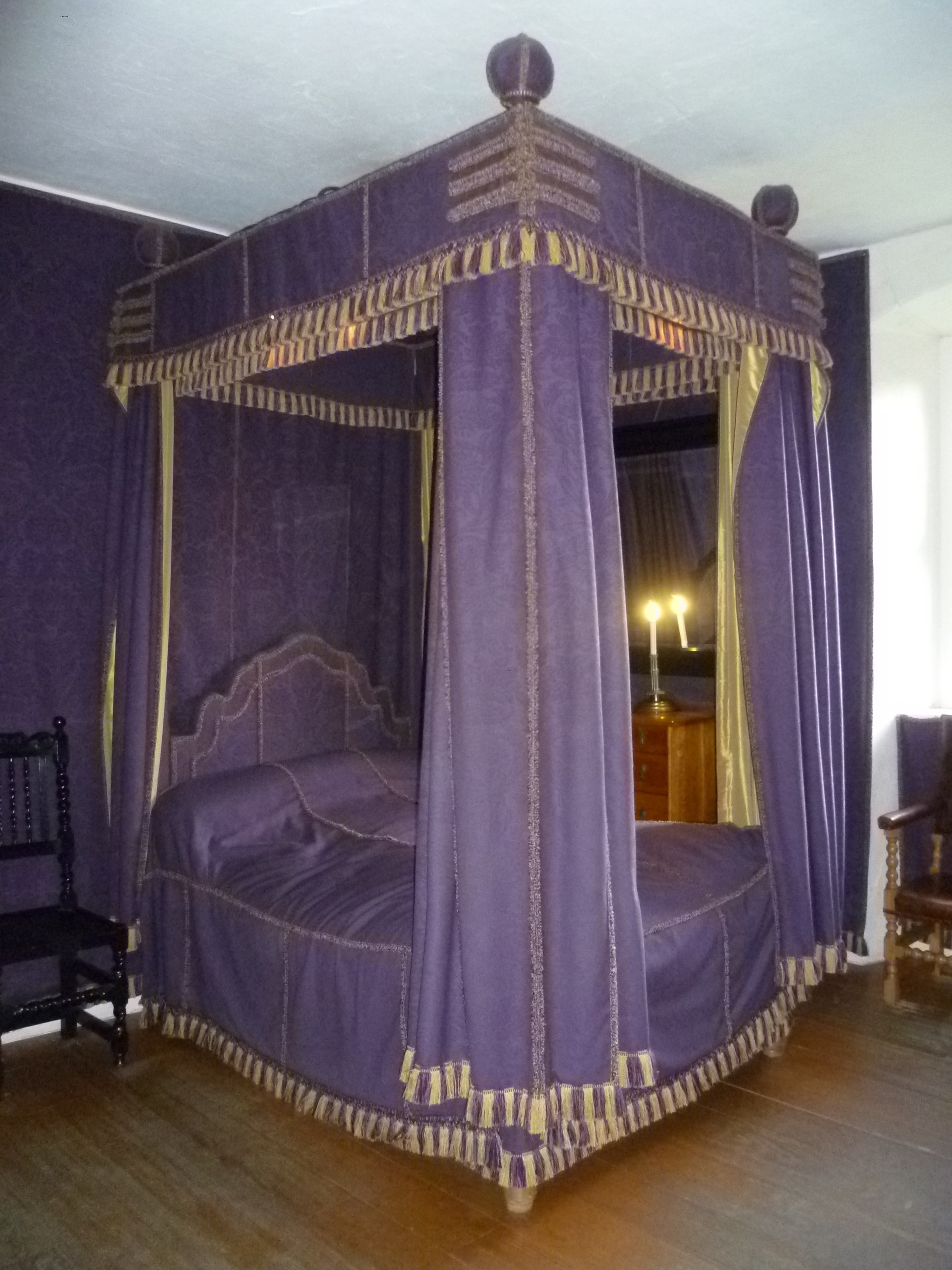
Canopied bed in My Lady's Closet

Archibald Campbell, 9th Earl of Argyll was born in 1629. He was a staunch supporter of the monarchy. In 1666 he bought the house that would become known as Argyll's Lodging and built it outwards to the north and south, while enclosing the courtyard behind a screen wall with an elaborate entrance gate. He also had the interior walls decorated with paintings, some of which have survived.

In 1680, the Earl opposed the oath attached to the Test Act, intended to ensure the loyalty of the holders of public office to King Charles II, because it also demanded conformity with the King's ideas on forms of church government and religious worship. The Earl's refusal to take the oath led to him being declared a traitor in 1681. He was imprisoned in Edinburgh Castle, but escaped, disguised as a woman, and fled from Leith to the Netherlands. His estates were confiscated.

The Earl had possessed the foresight, however, to have an inventory drawn up of all the belongings in his house in Stirling and had assigned them to his wife, Lady Anna Mackenzie, daughter of the Earl of Seaforth, whom he had married in 1670. Due to the fact that her first husband, the Earl of Balcarres, had remained loyal to the King, the latter granted her a pension and allowed her to keep her personal property.

In February 1685 Charles II died and was succeeded by his brother James VII. Argyll returned to Scotland intending to lead a rebellion against the King to coincide with the Duke of Monmouth's revolt in England. In June, shortly after landing, Argyll was captured in Renfrew, taken to Edinburgh and beheaded in the town's Grassmarket .

The house remained in the hands of the Campbells for the best part of a century. In 1746, during the Jacobite rebellion, Prince William, Duke of Cumberland resided in the house.

=== Military hospital ===
In 1764 John Campbell, 4th Duke of Argyll sold the house to Robert Campbell and James Wright, who in turn sold it to the McGregors of Balhaldie. Around 1800 the Army bought the house for use as a military hospital, because of lack of space in Stirling Castle. During the Napoleonic Wars the army was greatly expanded, from 40,000 to 225,000 men, and the small hospital in the castle proved inadequate.

The house remained in use as a military hospital until 1964 when it was turned into a youth hostel. In 1996 Historic Scotland opened it as a museum and has refurnished the rooms using the inventory prepared by the 9th Earl.

=== Building ===
Argyll's Lodging stands in Castle Wynd on the final approach to Stirling Castle. It was built and decorated in the Renaissance style. The plan of the house was originally a "P", the upper part of the "P" consisting of three wings around a courtyard to the west screened from the street by a wall with an entrance gate. The lower part of the "P" was a southwest wing which also bordered the street before it was demolished.

The north wing contained the kitchen on its ground floor, the eastern half being the original building with its early kitchen. The first floor contained the private rooms. The main entrance which is in the central east wing led directly into the Laigh Hall (ground-floor cellar). The first floor of the east wing contained the High Dining Room for entertaining guests and, on the south side, the more private Drawing Room. The ground floor of the south wing contained rooms for the head of the household and the eldest son. The southeastern corner of this wing housed the Lower Dining Room. The first floor of the south wing housed the bedrooms of the Lord and Lady of the house (My Lord and Lady's Bed Chamber) and My Lady's Closet, the private salon of the lady of the house.

=== Management ===
Argyll's Lodging is managed and maintained by Historic Scotland.
