= Charles Campbell (member for Campbeltown) =

Scottish soldier and politician

Colonel Charles Campbell was a Scottish soldier and politician of the seventeenth and eighteenth century.

== Biography ==
He was the third son of Archibald Campbell, 9th Earl of Argyll, and his wife Mary, daughter of James Stewart, 4th Earl of Moray. He was in Holland with his father, and attended the meeting of Scottish refugees at Amsterdam on 17 April 1685.

The same year he accompanied his father on an expedition to Scotland as part of Argyll's Rising, and was sent ashore when they arrived off the coast of Argyllshire to bring intelligence of the disposition of the gentlemen and common people. He was then sent ashore a second time to levy men but, falling ill, was seized by the Marquess of Atholl, who by virtue of his justiciary power resolved to hang him, sick or well, at the gate of Inveraray Castle. The Privy Council, however, at the intercession of several ladies, stopped the execution, and ordered him to be carried prisoner to Edinburgh. He was brought before the Justiciary Court on 21 August 1685, forfeited on his confession, and sentenced to banishment.

The forfeiture was rescinded in 1689, and in 1700 he was elected a burgh commissioner in the Parliament of Scotland for Campbeltown on its elevation to a royal burgh. He held the seat up to the time of the Union, a measure which he steadily supported.

He married, probably in 1678, Sophia, second daughter of Alexander Lindsay, 1st Earl of Balcarres, his father's step-daughter, who was the means of accomplishing the Earl of Argyll's escape from Edinburgh Castle. Of this marriage no descendants in the male line exist. Marriage two to Betty Bowles with issue.
