= Heritable jurisdictions =

Obsolete Scottish law

Heritable jurisdictions were, in the law of Scotland, grants of jurisdiction made to a man and his heirs. They were a common accompaniment to feudal tenures and conferred power on great families. Both before and after the Union frequent attempts were made by statute to restrict them since they were recognized as a source of danger to the state. All were finally abolished by the Heritable Jurisdictions Act in 1747, following the Jacobite rising of 1745, with compensation available upon formal application by the dispossessed.
