= Anna Mackenzie =

Scottish courtier (1621–1707)

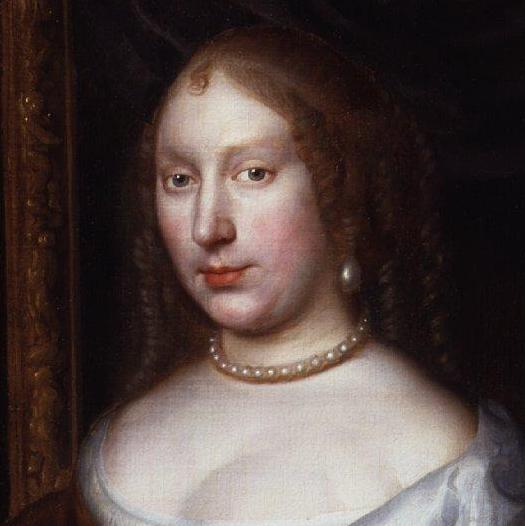
- Lady Mackenzie, countess of Balcarres and afterwards of Argyll
- Born: uncertain. his first biographer, in 19th century estimated 1621, which is incorrect as her brother was Christianized in Sep 1621, and Childs were Christianized in the first months of their life. Brahan Castle, Easter Ross, Scotland
- Died: 1707 (aged 85–86)
- Political party: Jacobite

Lady Anna Mackenzie (1621–1707), also Ann MacKenzie, was a Scottish courtier, wife of the first Earl of Balcarres and the mother of the second and third. After her first husband died, she married Archibald Campbell, 9th Earl of Argyll. She was a governess to William III when he was a child. Mackenzie suffered because she was a Jacobite and her second husband was executed for leading a rising against James VII and II which was intended to support the Monmouth Rebellion. She worked to keep together the estates of Balcarres despite the tumultuous times in which she lived and her family's support of the Jacobite cause. Her memoirs were published more than a century after her death.

== Early life and Balcarres ==
Mackenzie was born in Brahan Castle in about 1621. Her parents were Colin Mackenzie, the first earl of Seaforth, Viscount Fortrose, and Lord Mackenzie of Kintail, and Margaret, the daughter of Alexander Seton, 1st Earl of Dunfermline, Lord Chancellor of Scotland. She had several siblings, all of whom died young except for an elder sister, Jean (died 1648). Her parents died whilst Anna was a child.

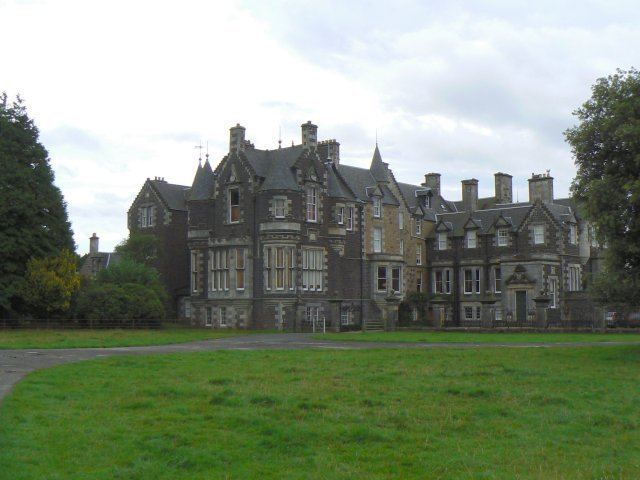
Balcarres House

After her father's death, in 1633, she resided at Leslie House, the seat of her cousin, Lord Rothes. There she was married in April 1640, against the wish of her uncle, then the head of the family, to another cousin, Alexander Lindsay, master of Balcarres, who became Lord Balcarres in the following year. She worked throughout her life to keep together the estates of Balcarres despite the tumultuous times in which she lived and her family's support of the Jacobite cause.

In 1647, her husband became responsible for Edinburgh Castle and in 1651, Charles II became the King of Scots and he promoted her husband to be the Earl of Balcarres. On 22 February 1651, the king paid the couple a visit shortly before the birth of her first child, to whom he became godfather. On the invasion after Worcester, she went with her husband to the Scottish Highlands, where he had command of the royalists. To pay for the debts incurred by Balcarres in the royal cause, she sold her jewels and other valuables, and many years of her subsequent life were spent in redeeming the ruin in which the Balcarres family had been involved.

Their support for the king resulted in their estates being seized. Her husband tried to raise a rebellion in Scotland, but in 1654 they were both summoned to France to assist the king. Leaving her own children in Scotland, Anna was chosen to be the governess of the future William III of England in the Hague in 1657. Between Anna, her husband, John Maitland, 1st Duke of Lauderdale, (Note: The countess's letters to John Maitland, 1st Duke of Lauderdale and others on the occasion of her husband's death are preserved among the Lauderdale papers in the British Museum; they are considered to be models of sincere and intelligent piety.) Kincardine, and Robert Moray there existed a close friendship, as well as family connection. After her husband's death at the Hague on 30 August 1659, her young son, Charles (1650–1662) became the Earl.

The countess returned to Fifeshire, but shortly went on to France, where, being attached to the Presbyterian church, she was instrumental in securing the support of the French Protestant ministers for the king in 1660. At the Restoration, a pension was settled upon her by Charles, who often expressed for her a deep admiration, but it was some years before it was paid. During the interval, she and her children suffered great privations. She remained in England until May 1662, and there became acquainted with Richard Baxter, who declared that "her great wisdom, modesty, piety, and sincerity made her accounted the saint at the court". The conversion of her eldest daughter and the daughter's subsequent death in a nunnery were a great blow to Anna. In 1662, she returned to Scotland, when from poverty and anxiety she became ill. The King agreed to pay Anna and the elder of her two sons £1000 a year in recognition of the assistance he had received from their family. The money was not a complete gift as they had to return the governorship of Edinburgh Castle. Her son Charles died in October 1662, whereupon Colin succeeded as 3rd Earl of Balcarres. In 1664, her financial condition improved by the payment of the promised pension, for which she had petitioned in November 1663, but the friendship with Lauderdale appears to have been broken off. The next few years were spent in trying to pay off the debts upon the Balcarres estates, and in 1669, her son's rights on the Seaforth estates were given up by her for the sum of 80,000 marks.

== Countess of Argyll ==
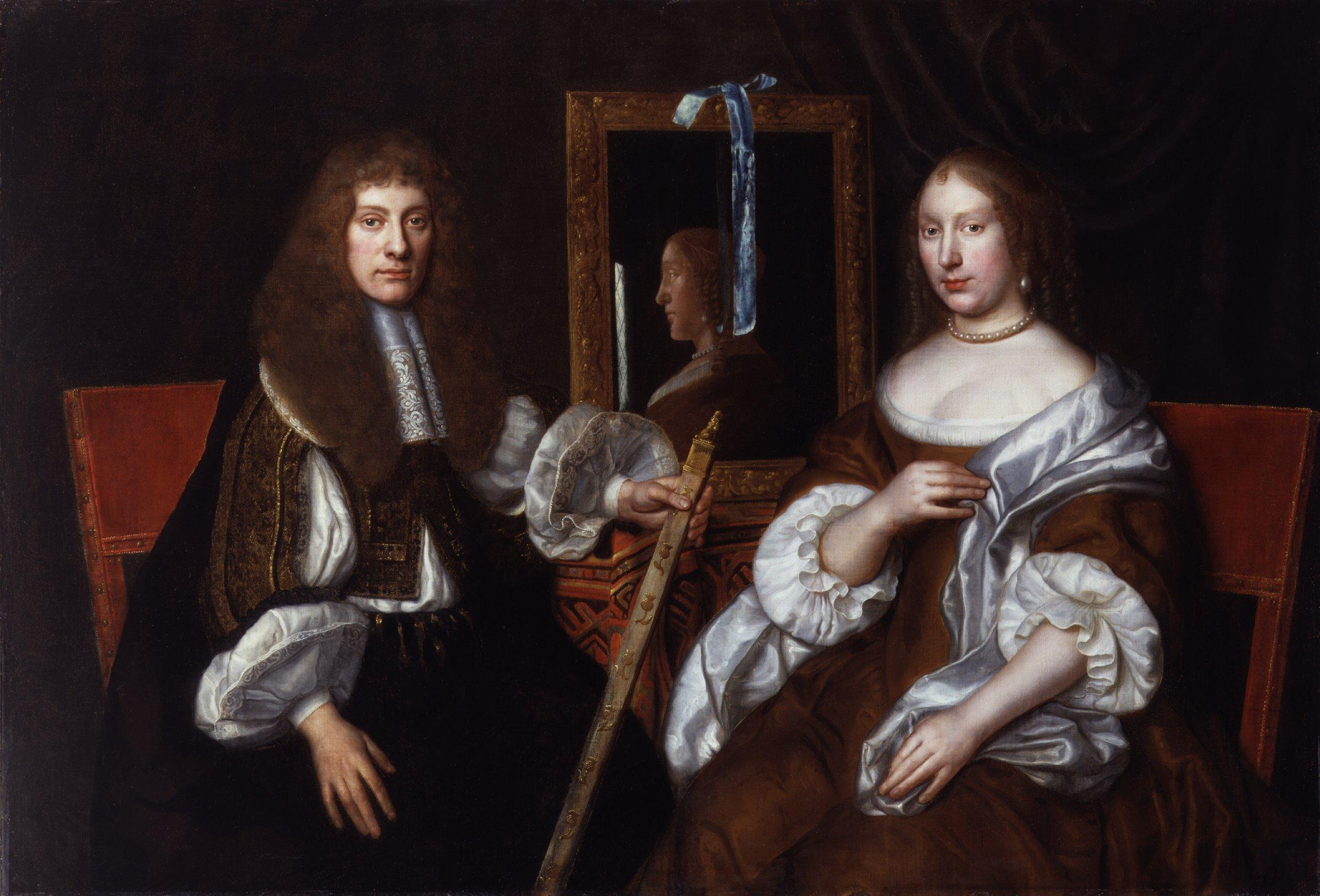
Anna with her second husband, Archibald Campbell, 9th Earl of Argyll.

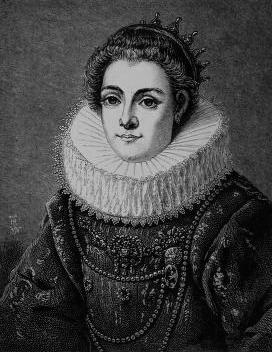
This engraving was the frontispiece of her memoirs but it is thought to be another person

On 28 January 1670, she married Archibald Campbell, 9th Earl of Argyll. After this marriage, she was able to assist with the debts inherited by her son, Colin, from her first husband. However, her son failed to take advantage of this financial opportunity. Her second marriage did not go well either and her husband was sentenced to death for high treason. He managed to escape to Holland due to the brave intervention of Anna's daughter, Sophia Lindsay, who smuggled him away disguised as one of her servants. It was said that Sophia only escaped a public whipping for helping her step-father because of the intercession of the future James II.

Anna was in time supported financially by the King despite her husband's estates being seized. Her husband supported the Monmouth Rebellion by raising a rebellion in Scotland to partner the force established in England by the Duke of Monmouth. Anna was arrested as soon as her husband arrived in Scotland to raise the rebellion and placed in Edinburgh Castle. Argyll was eventually executed, as his father had been before him. After her husband's death, his son Charles married his saviour: Anna's daughter, Sophia Lindsay.

Anna was buried beside her first husband and their son Charles in the Balcarres chapel, although no record of interment is found in the parish books. Her memories were gathered together and published in 1868 by Alexander Crawford Lindsay the 25th Earl of Crawford. (Note: In Willcock's A Scots Earl in Covenanting Times: Being Life and Times of Archibald, 9th Earl of Argyll (1629–1685) (1907), he states: "Lindsay, Life of Lady Anna Mackenzie, p. 82. This pleasantly written little biography appeared in 1868. The frontispiece professes to be a portrait of the Countess of Balcarres. It is that of a lady in Elizabethan dress and is the likeness usually given as that of the first wife of the 7th Earl of Argyll. How the likeness of our 9th Earl's grandmother came to be presented as that of his second wife we cannot tell. The portrait in question had been engraved before and published with the inscription—'Anne, Countess of Argyle from a picture in the Collection of Lady Mary Coke.'")

== Bibliography ==
- Mackenzie, Alexander (1878). The Celtic magazine. Vol. 3 (Public domain ed.). A. Mackenzie and A. MacGregor.
- Stephen, Sir Leslie (1886). Dictionary of national biography: vol. VIII. Burton – Cantwell (Public domain ed.). Smith, Elder, & Co.
- Willcock, John (1907). A Scots Earl in Covenanting Times: Being Life and Times of Archibald, 9th Earl of Argyll (1629–1685) (Public domain ed.). A. Elliot. p. 172.
