= Campbeltown (Parliament of Scotland constituency) =

Constituency of the Old Parliament of Scotland in Argyll and Bute, Scotland

Campbeltown was a royal burgh that elected one Commissioner to the Estates of Scotland between 1700 and 1707.

Campbeltown in Kintyre was erected a royal burgh by charter of King William II on 19 April 1700, at the request of the Earl of Argyll.

The first and only Commissioner for the burgh was Mr Charles Campbell, who took his seat on 2 November 1700. He was Lord Argyll's brother, and represented the burgh from 1700 to 1702 and in the last Parliament from 1703 to 1707.

Following the Act of Union 1707, Campbeltown was represented in the Parliament of Great Britain as part of the Ayr district of burghs.

== List of burgh commissioners ==
- 1700–02, 1702–07: Charles Campbell

== See also ==
- List of constituencies in the Parliament of Scotland at the time of the Union
