= James Home =

James Home may refer to:

- James Home, 2nd Earl of Home (died 1633), Scottish nobleman
- James Home, 3rd Earl of Home (died 1666), Scottish nobleman
- James Everard Home (1798–1853), British naval officer
- James Home of Coldenknowes (died 1592), Scottish landowner, soldier, and keeper of Edinburgh Castle
