= Robert Inglis (merchant) =

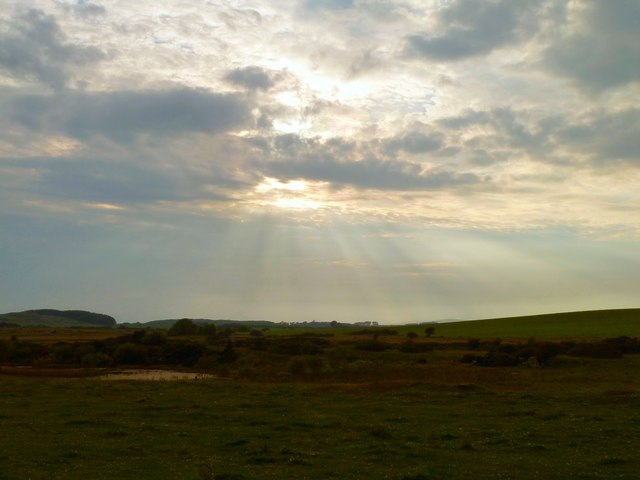
Robert Inglis held land in Wigtownshire by inheritance, including West Drumrae.

Robert Inglis (died 1655) was a merchant and financier of Scottish origin working in London in the first half of the 17th century.

== A Scottish financial background ==
Robert Inglis's family owned property in Galloway and Ayrshire, and his grandfather John Inglis was the church minister of Ochiltree. His father, John Inglis, was a merchant burgess in Edinburgh, and had been an apprentice of a skinner, Robert Vernor. Robert Inglis inherited lands at Lochtoun in the barony of Ravenstone or Remistoun in Wigtownshire.

Robert Inglis's mother, Sara Fowler, was a granddaughter of the wealthy Edinburgh moneylender Janet Fockart, and her second husband, William Fowler (died 1572), an Edinburgh merchant with a business selling textiles. Sara Fowler's great uncle, the poet William Fowler, was a secretary to Anne of Denmark, wife of James VI and I. The poet William Drummond of Hawthornden was her cousin.

== Wealth and the Scottish Covenant ==
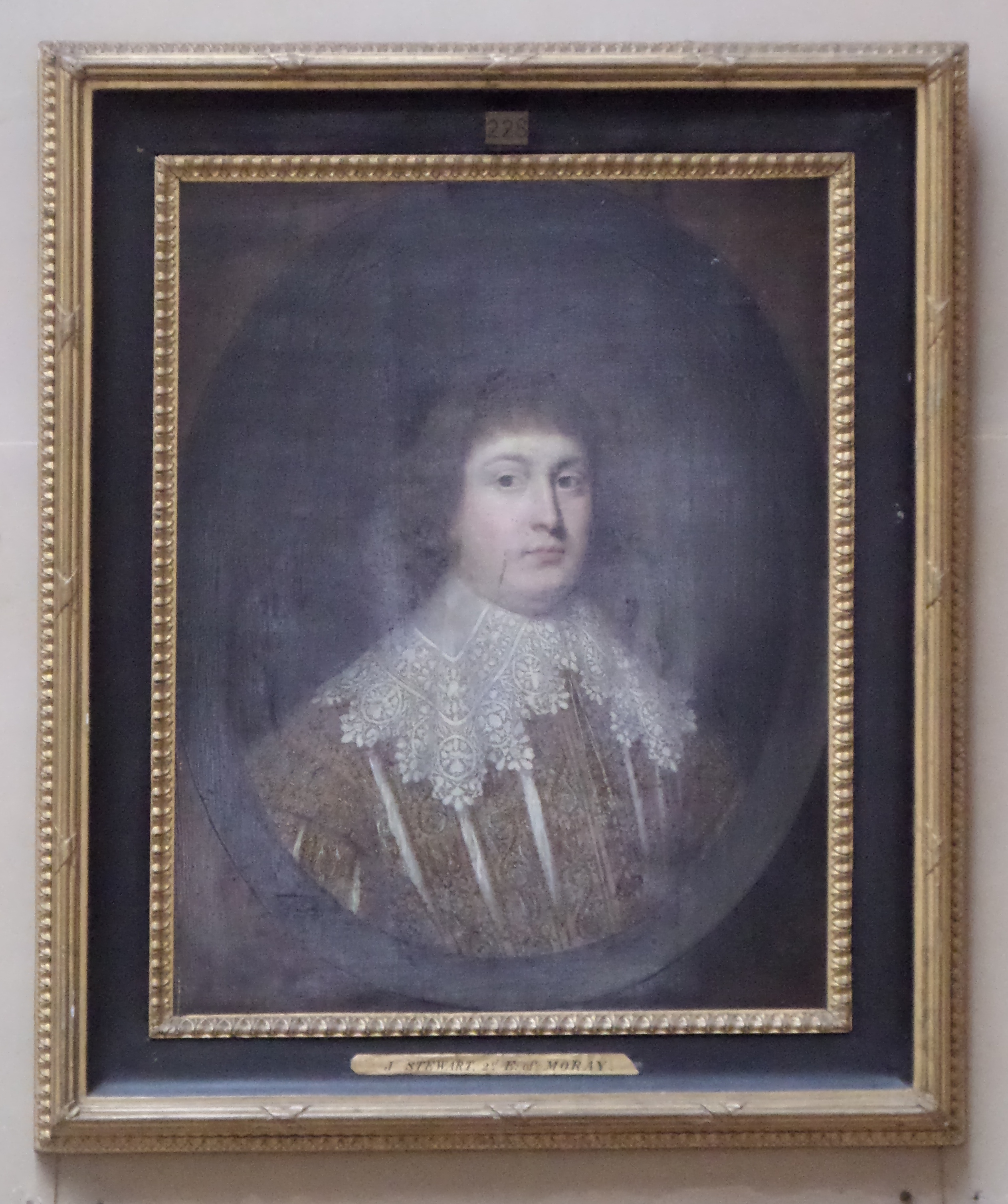
Robert Inglis worked for James Stuart, 4th Earl of Moray

Inglis was involved in the finances of aristocrats, particularly those who had acquired lands both in England and Scotland, including the Countess of Home, and her sons-in-law, the Earls of Moray and Lauderdale and daughters. He looked after the affairs of the Countesses of Moray and Lauderdale as "administratices" of their mother's will. Inglis helped William Kerr, 1st Earl of Lothian buy paintings for Newbattle Abbey, including works by George Geldorp.

In June 1643, Inglis came to Glasgow in connection with a disputed cargo of "rich commodities", tobacco, and salt hides. He got into an argument on the street. Colin Campbell called him a rascal and "douped him on the breast". The case was referred to the Privy Council of Scotland.

In January 1646, Inglis lent £100 to James Hope, who was making a trip to Europe to research lead mining technology and to see Elizabeth of Bohemia at The Hague. Inglis was an agent of the Goldsmith's Hall and was able to obtain cash in gold. He was able to give cash in London to holders of "letters of exchange". In September 1646, Thomas Hope wrote to his son-in-law, Charles Erskine of Cambuskenneth, who was in London buying items for Hope's daughter Lady Cardross, that he had sent a letter of exchange for him to present to Inglis. Inglis could exchange letters or bills of exchange with other merchant financiers, including John Clerk (first) of Penicuik. A bill made in Edinburgh could be cashed in Paris by a third party.

During the 1640s, Inglis was involved in loans and financing of public commissions sent from Edinburgh to London. He stood security as a guarantor for loans made by William Dick of Braid in 1644, and he was on occasion Dick's factor in London. Inglis obtained money for provisions and gold on bills of exchange to pay the Scottish army of the Solemn League and Covenant. In May 1644, he accepted £7,300 from the Countess of Home as a loan to balance gold sent to the Scottish army in Ireland at Carrickfergus. The soldier Sir John Ruthven was involved in this financial transaction.

At the time of the "Engagement", in December 1647, Inglis received letters from Scotland for Elizabeth Maxwell, Countess of Lanark. A list of cipher names compiled by James Graham, 1st Marquess of Montrose around the year 1648 includes a note about correspondence to be left with "Robert Inglis, Merchand of London, at London stone". The London Stone was a landmark at Cannon Street.

When the Earl of Lauderdale was declared "delinquent" in 1648, his furnishings in London and Highgate were forfeited and sold despite petitions and counter-claims that the furniture belonged to his daughter Mary Maitland or had been sold to Robert Inglis.

In March 1649, Inglis received the sum of £13,837 6s 8d. for managing the expenses of the Scottish commissioners at the trial of Charles I.

Robert Inglis died in London in 1655. Further details of his property and business transactions were registered in the records of the Edinburgh Commissary Court, including bonds from the merchant John Clerk, and from Prudence Stock, a widow who held a freehold in Chelsea, and was a partner in Lady Lane of Horton's Charity.

== Foundation of George Heriot's School ==
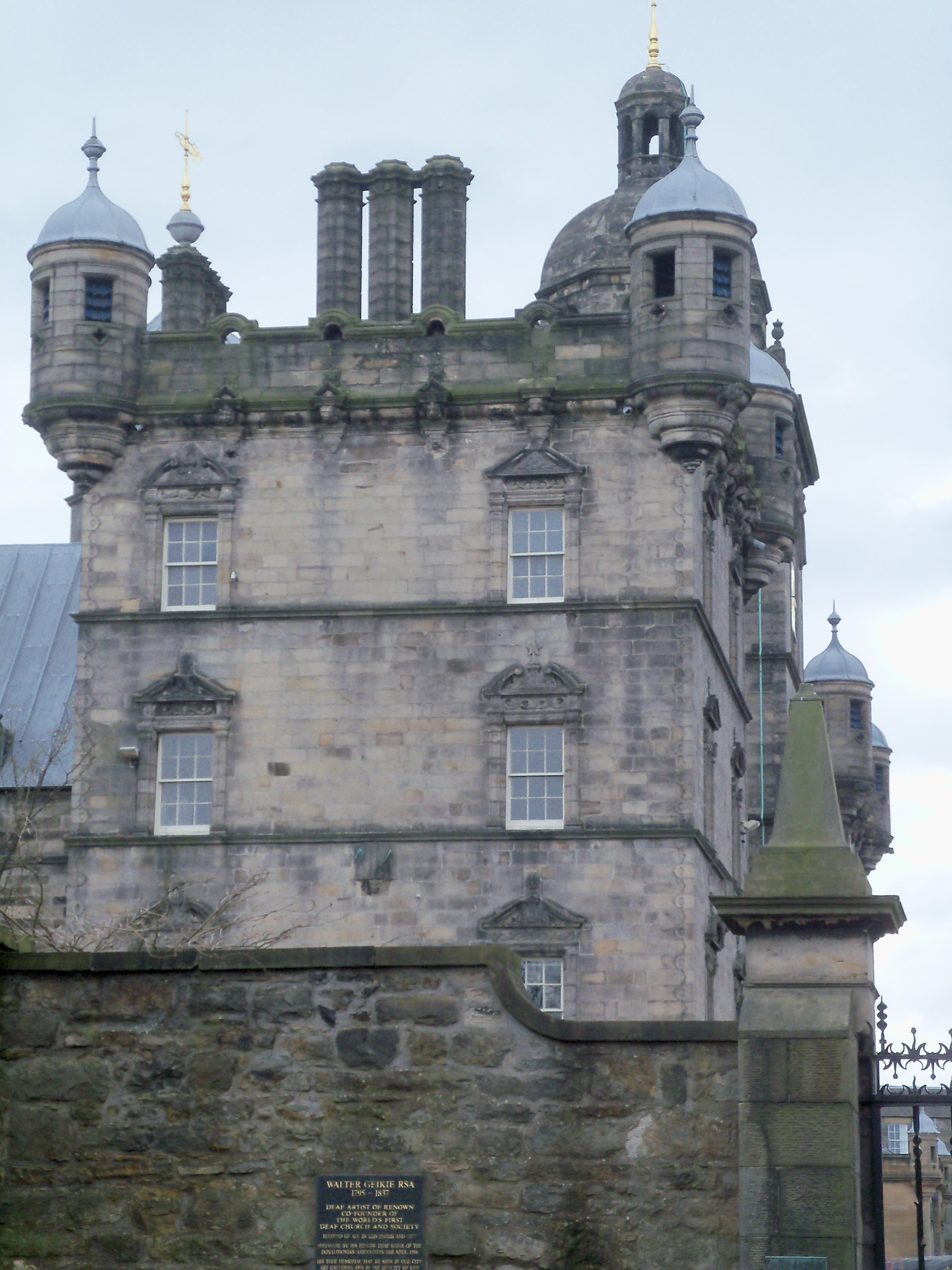
George Heriot's School, Edinburgh

John Clerk wrote bills of exchange involving Inglis and another Scottish merchant in London, John Jossy or Jousie. He was a relative of the textile merchant Robert Jousie who had been involved in Scottish crown finance. With John Jousie, in 1639, Inglis was appointed to be an executor of the will of Robert Johnstone LL.D., a historian and a benefactor of George Heriot's School. Johnstone, the Lombard Street goldsmith William Terry, and the French-born apothecary Gideon Delaune had been the executors of the goldsmith George Heriot, who made a bequest to found a school in Edinburgh. Johnstone appointed the courtier and architect David Cunningham of Auchenharvie to be overseer of his own will.

These families were closely connected. David Cunningham of Auchenharvie was a cousin of David Cunningham of Robertland, who married Elizabeth Jousie, widow of the goldsmith James Heriot, a brother of George Heriot. The younger Robert Jousie, a courtier and Yeoman of the Robes, had carried jewels to Spain for Prince Charles in 1623.

== Family ==
Robert Inglis married Christian Udwart, a daughter of Nicoll Udwart (the younger) and Katherine Balcanquhall, a daughter of the minister Walter Balcanquhall. Her brother, also called Walter Balcanquhall, was Dean of Rochester and a friend of George Heriot. Their marriage contract was made on 18 January 1628. Nicoll Uddert and Sara Fouler settled the sums of 10,000 and 18,000 merks in Scottish money on the couple.

In London, they lived in Walbrook Ward, and Inglis claimed a coat of arms. Christian Inglis was involved in her husband's business, and was authorised to issue money drawn on letters of credit when her husband was not in London. Thomas Hope called her "Christian Inglis", and her husband's will names her as "Christiane Edward alias Ingles". Usually, women in early modern Scotland did not change their surnames to that of their husband on marriage.

Their children included:

- John Inglis
- Sarah Inglis
