= Margaret Home, Countess of Moray =

Scottish aristocrat and compiler of recipe books (died 1683)

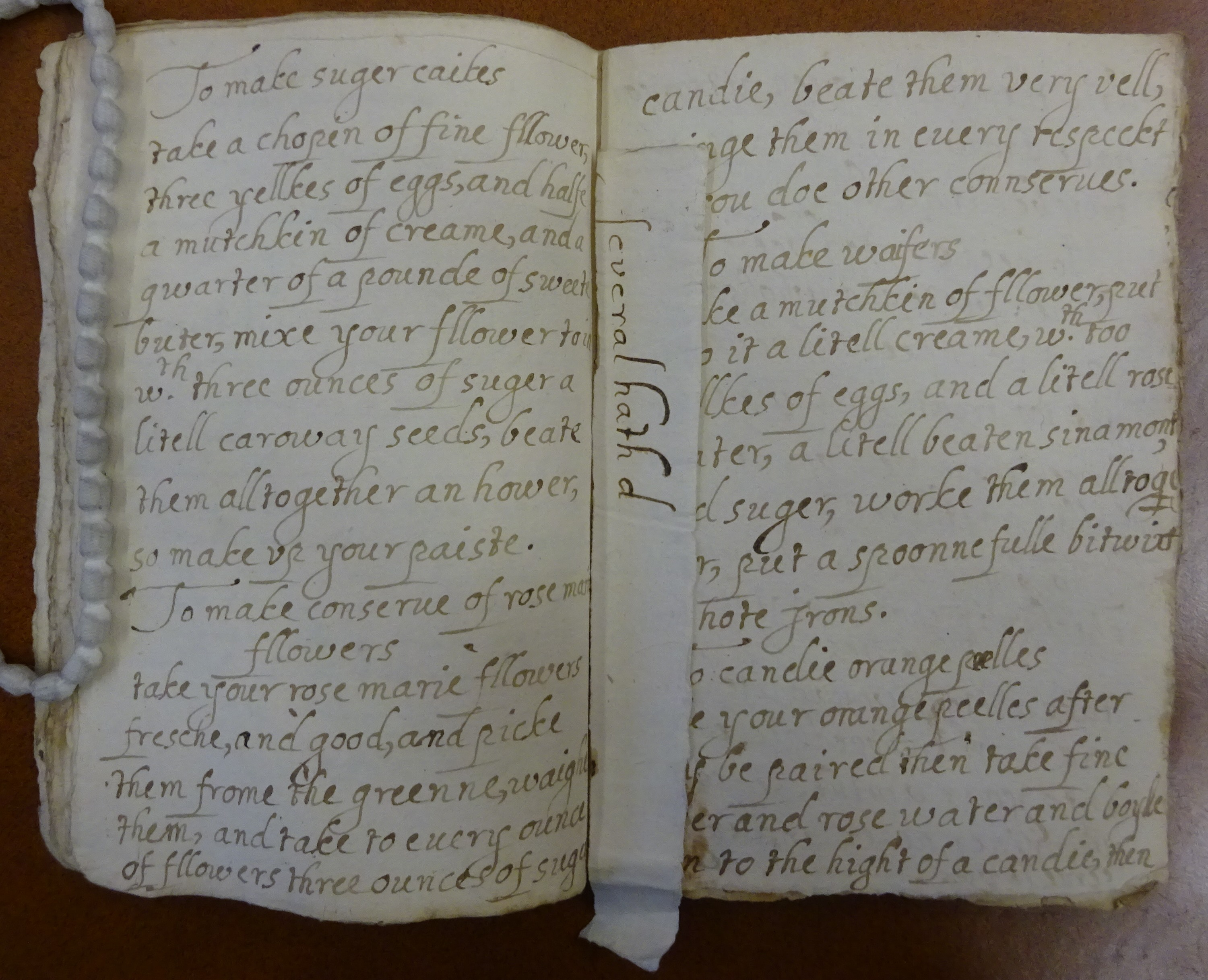
Recipes for sugar cakes and wafers written by Margaret Home, Countess of Moray

Margaret Home, Countess of Moray (died 1683) was a Scottish aristocrat and compiler of recipe books.

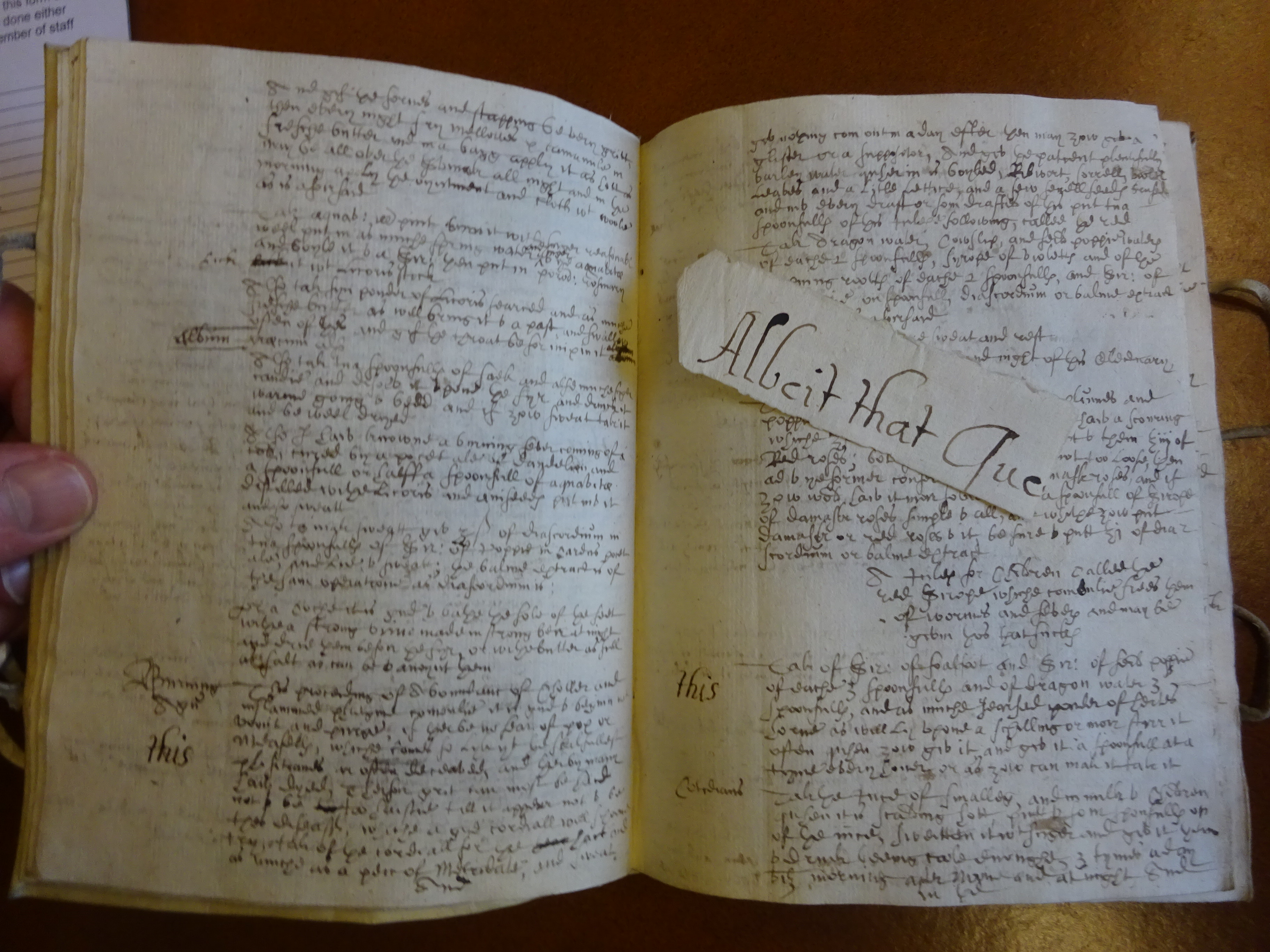
The vellum-bound recipe book of Margaret Home, Countess of Moray, with her bookmark

== Family background ==
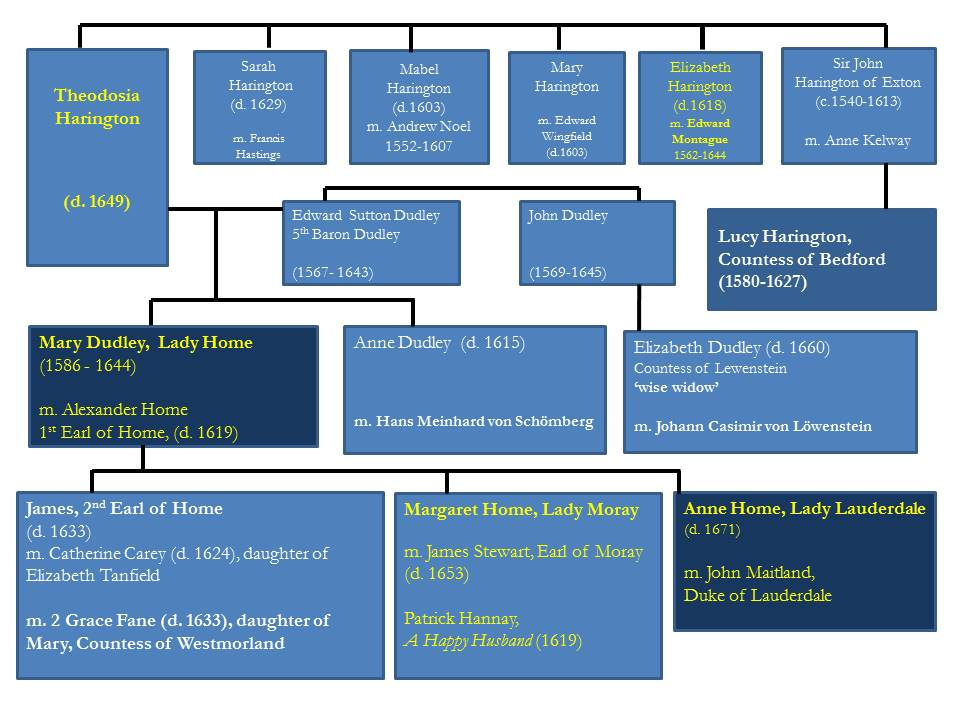
Margaret Home's family connections

She was the eldest daughter of Alexander Home, 1st Earl of Home (died 1619) and Mary Sutton, Countess of Home (died 1644).

Her siblings were her brother, James Home, 2nd Earl of Home (d. 1633) who married firstly, Catherine Cary (1609–1626) eldest daughter of Viscount Falkland and the playwright Elizabeth Tanfield Cary author of The Tragedy of Mariam, and in 1626 married secondly Grace Fane (d. 1633) daughter of Francis Fane, 1st Earl of Westmorland and Mary Mildmay, and her younger sister, Anne Home, Countess of Lauderdale (d. 1671), who married John Maitland, 1st Duke of Lauderdale. Their daughter Mary Maitland married John Hay, 2nd Marquess of Tweeddale.

== A Happy Husband ==
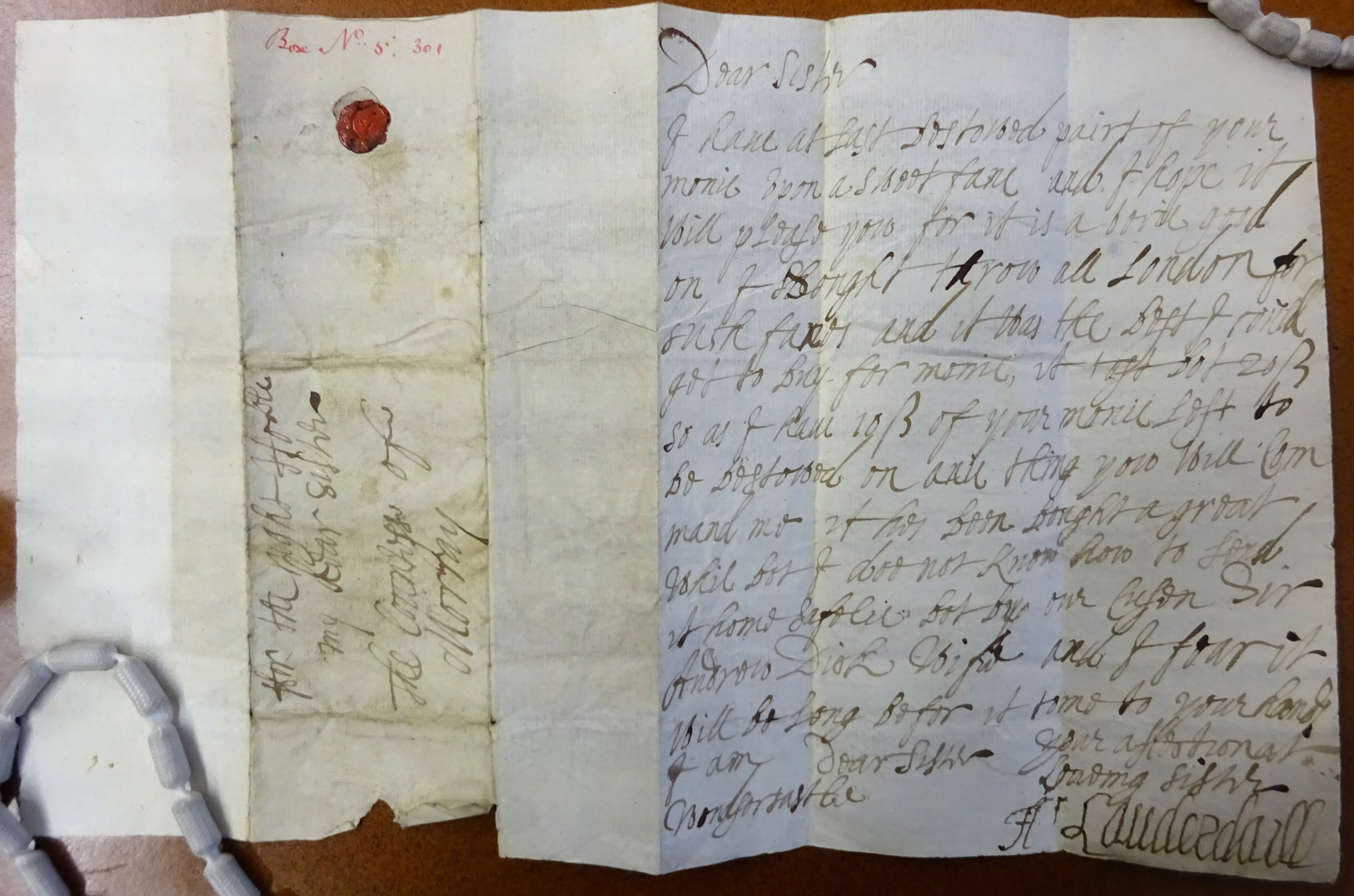
Letter from Anne Home, Countess of Lauderdale to her sister Margaret Home, Countess of Moray

A Scottish author Patrick Hannay (fl. 1616–1630) dedicated A happy husband or, Directions for a Maide to choose her Mate, As also, a Wives behaviour towards her Husband after Marriage (Edinburgh, 1618/1619?) to Margaret Home. The poem includes rhyming couplets indicating the responsibilities of housewives.

In October 1627 she married James Stuart, eldest son of the Earl of Moray, then known as "Lord Doune". She had a nursery for her children in her mother's house in the Canongate of Edinburgh, now known as Moray House.

After her brother, the Earl of Home died in 1633, she received a share of the composition of the barony of Home. She and her husband refurbished their house at Donibristle, employing English artisans including the painters, Edward Arthur and George Crawford, and installed a fountain with a bronze figure of Mercury balanced on a tortoise. A suite of portraits for furnishing a gallery survive, in Sunderland frames.

At Donibristle House, her cabinet included an early and luxurious telescope, bought in London in 1634 for £15 sterling. Books included volumes of sermons and a work penned by Esther Inglis, while Markham's Husbandry and Country Farm, a French book of plants and physic, and Parkinson's Herbal, may have been of practical use. She compiled three recipe books with the help of a clerk called Abraham, including family recipes for medicines and culinary recipes supplied by a Mistress Young. A treatment diary possibly first written by her sister-in-law Grace Fane in 1628 was included, mostly copied in Margaret Home's handwriting.

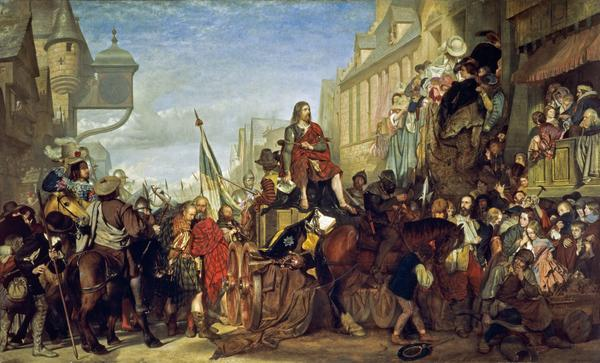
Montrose and the Campbell–Stewart wedding, by James Drummond

In May 1650, the house in Canongate was used for the wedding party of her daughter Mary Stuart and Lord Lorne. It is said that the family and Archibald Johnston watched the captive Earl of Montrose being taken up the Royal Mile. Their encounter was depicted in 1859 by the history painter James Drummond. War came to Donibristle in July 1651, with the battle of Inverkeithing.

== Property and family legacies ==
As a married woman in Scotland, Margaret Home, had rights over her own property and income. In 1652, she made over lands in Moray from her dowry or terce to her husband, so that he could sell them to meet their debts. He died in 1653. Financial issues caused a rift between her and her eldest son Alexander and Alexander Brodie of Brodie. The Countess lived as a widow till 1683, she maintained Moray House in Edinburgh and its gardens, and planted woods at Donibristle. The writer Thomas Kirk saw the Mercury fountain in 1677.

The Earl of Argyll wrote to Lauderdale about family issues in 1667. Her younger sons Francis and Archibald were causing problems, and Archibald had taken valuables from her closet at Donibristle and stole from her as she arrived in a litter. Argyll understood that Francis hoped to obtain a better settlement by staging this robbery. Argyll recovered the goods from Archibald. He thought that Margaret's servants robbed her and ran a disreputable ale house in the Canongate.

Like many Scottish widows, Margaret retained considerable wealth in her own name. After her death, the family lawyers Hugh Paterson and his son, worked with one of her grandsons, Charles Stuart, later Earl of Moray, to make inventories, and found a fortune in silver plate hidden in a cupboard at the Canongate. Hugh Paterson, the elder, was the builder of Bannockburn House near Stirling.

== Family ==
Their children included:

- James Stuart, Lord Doune (died 1653).
- Alexander Stuart, 5th Earl of Moray, who married Emilia Balfour
- Francis Stuart of Cullalloe, (Fife)
- Archibald Stuart of Dunearn, who married Anna Henderson, daughter of John Henderson of Fordell
- Margaret Stuart, who married Alexander Sutherland, 1st Lord Duffus
- Henrietta Stuart, who married Hugh Campbell of Calder
- Anne Stuart
- Anne Stuart, who married David Ross of Balnagown
- Mary Stuart, who married Archibald Campbell, 9th Earl of Argyll, at the Canongate in 1650
