= Clan Hannay =

Lowland Scottish clan

- Crest: A cross crosslet fitchee issuing out of a crescent Sable
- Motto: Per Ardua Ad Alta (Through difficulties to Heaven)

Profile
- Plant badge: Periwinkle

Chief
- Dr. David R. Hannay of Kirkdale and of that Ilk, 16th Baron of Kirkdale, Baron of Maxwell of Cardoness
- Chief of the Name and Arms of Hannay
- Historic seat: Sorbie Tower
Septs of Clan Hannay
Hannay, Hanney, Hannah, Hanna
Clan branches
Hannay of Sorbie (historic chiefs)
Hannays of Grennan
Hannays of Knock
Hannays of Garrie
Hannays of Kingsmuir
Rival clans
Clan Murray

Clan Hannay is a Lowland Scottish clan.

== History ==
=== Origins of the clan ===
The Hannays are from the ancient princedom of Galloway. The name appears to have originally been spelt Ahannay but its origin is uncertain. It could derive from the Scottish Gaelic Ultimately Irish Gaelic O'Hannaidh or Ap Shenaeigh.

=== Wars of Scottish Independence ===
In 1296, Gilbert de Hannethe appears on the Ragman Rolls submitting to Edward I of England. This could be the same Gilbert who acquired the lands of Sorbie. The Hannays were suspicious of Robert the Bruce's ambitions and instead supported the claim of John Balliol. Balliol was descended from the Celtic Princes of Galloway through his mother, Lady Devorgilla.

=== 15th & 16th centuries ===
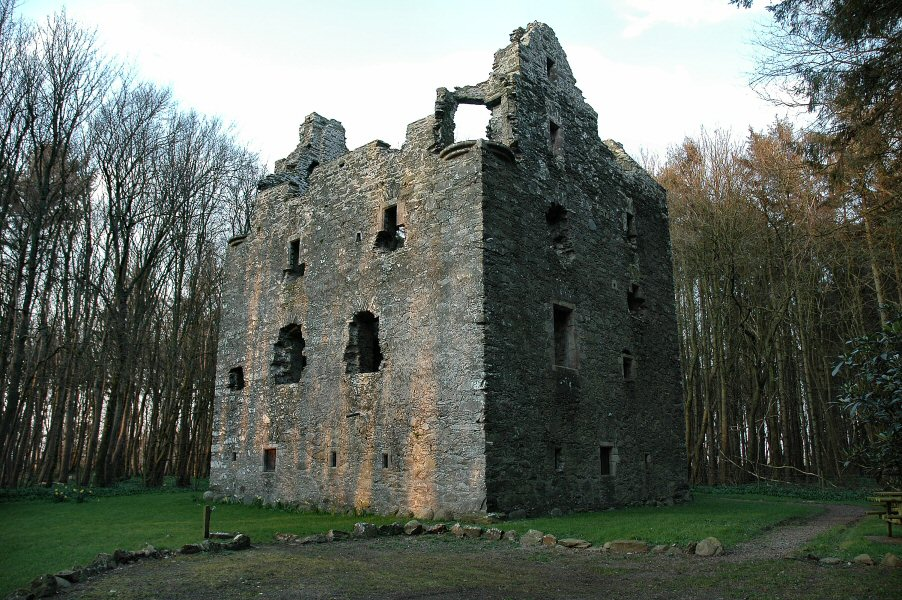
Sorbie Tower, ancient seat of Clan Hannay.

In the fifteenth and sixteenth centuries the Hannays extended their influence over the surrounding area including the building of Sorbie Tower which remained the seat of the Clan Chief until the seventeenth century.

=== 17th century ===
At the beginning of the 17th century the Clan Hannay was locked in a deadly feud with the Clan Murray of Broughton. It resulted in the Hannays being outlawed. The consequences of this were that many Hannays emigrated to Ulster, where the name is still found in large numbers in County Antrim, County Down and County Armagh.

Patrick Hannay had a distinguished military career and was patronised by Queen Elizabeth of Bohemia, daughter of James VI of Scotland and sister of Charles I of England. After the death of Queen Anne who was the wife of James VI in 1619, Patrick Hannay composed two eulogies and in return had many published on his own death, one of which said: 'Go on in virtue, aftertimes will tell, none but Hannay could have done so well'.

Possibly the best known Hannay was James Hannay, the Dean of St Giles' in Edinburgh who had the claim to fame of being the target of Jenny Geddes' stool. In an infamous incident in 1637 the Dean had begun to read the new liturgy when with a cry of "Thou false thief, dost thou say Mass at my lug?" was heard and a stool came flying from the congregation, thrown by an incensed Jenny Geddes. The incident began a full-scale riot which took the town guard to control.

Sir Robert Hannay of Mochrum was created a Baronet of Nova Scotia In 1630. From the Sorbie roots the Hannays of Grennan, Knock, Garrie and Kingsmuir also evolved.

== The modern Clan Hannay ==
In 1582, Alexander Hannay, a younger son of the chief, Hannay of Sorbie, purchased the lands of Kirkdale which were in the Stewartry of Kirkcudbright. His son was John Hannay of Kirkdale, who established the line which is today recognised by the Lord Lyon King of Arms as the chief of the name and arms of Hannay.

A younger son of Hannay of Kirkdale was Alexander Hannay who was a professional soldier, administrator and adventurer, who amassed a substantial personal fortune in 18th Century India, rising to the rank of colonel. His elder brother was Sir Samuel Hannay of Kirkdale, who succeeded to the title and estates of his kinsman, Sir Robert Hannay of Mochrum, Baronet. The next Baronet was Sir Samuel Hannay, who entered the service of the Habsburg Emperors and built himself a mansion on his family lands. It is this mansion which is said to have provided the inspiration for Walter Scott's novel, Guy Mannering. Sir Samuel died in 1841 and the estate passed to his sister, Mary, and from her to her nephew, William Ransford Hannay, from whom the present chief is descended.

== Clan Chief ==
Clan chief: Chief Ramsay William Rainsford Hannay of Kirkdale and of that Ilk, 15th Baron of Kirkdale, Baron of Maxwell of Cardoness, died on 10 January 2004 at Gatehouse-of-Fleet, Scotland, and was succeeded by his son, Dr. David R. Hannay of Kirkdale and of that Ilk, as Chief of Clan Hannay.

== Clan castles ==
In 1965 the ancient clan seat, Sorbie Tower, was presented to the clan trust and a maintenance scheme was put in place.
