= Anne Home, Countess of Lauderdale =

Scottish aristocrat (died 1671)

Anne Home
- Countess of Lauderdale
- Born: unknown
- Died: December 1671; Paris, France
- Noble family: Home
- Spouse: John Maitland, 1st Duke of Lauderdale
- Issue: Mary Maitland
- Father: Alexander Home, 1st Earl of Home
- Mother: Mary Sutton, Countess of Home

Anne Home, Countess of Lauderdale (died 1671) was a Scottish aristocrat.

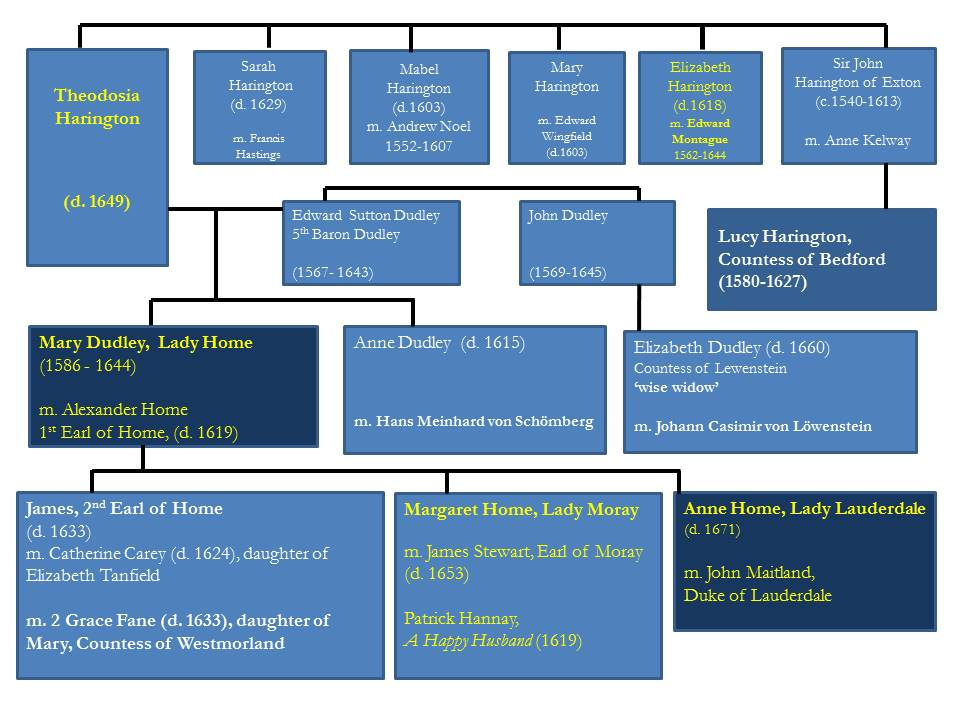
Harington Dudley family connections

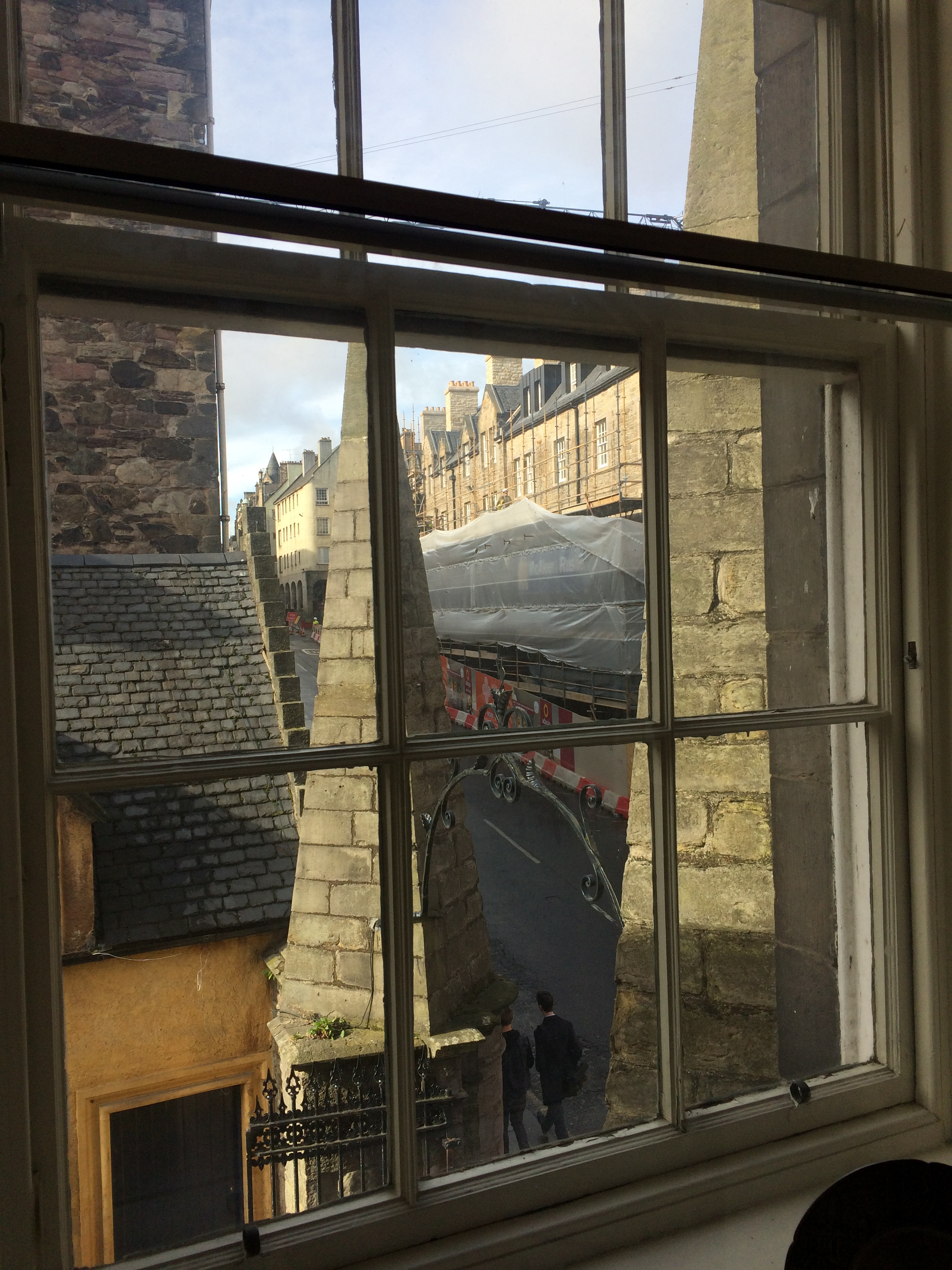
Anne Home was brought up in Moray House in Edinburgh

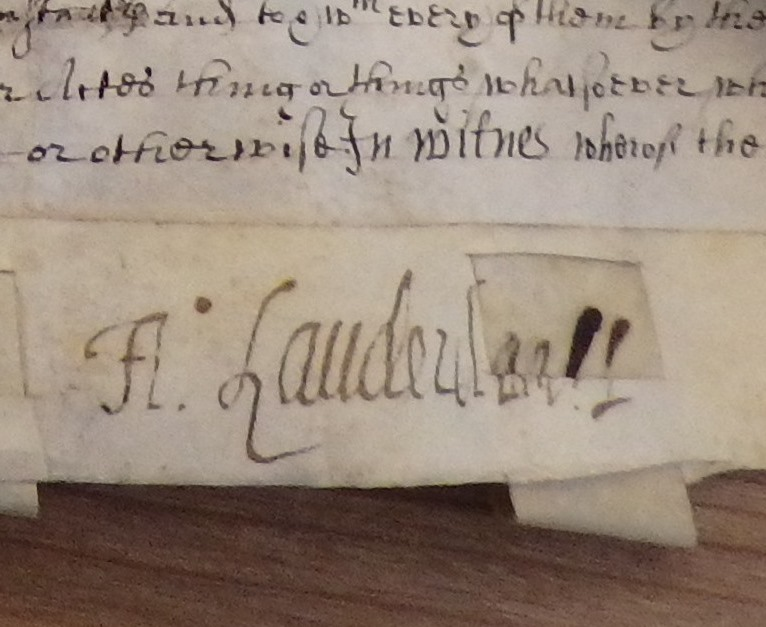
Signature of Anne Lauderdale, Countess of Lauderdale (National Library of Scotland)

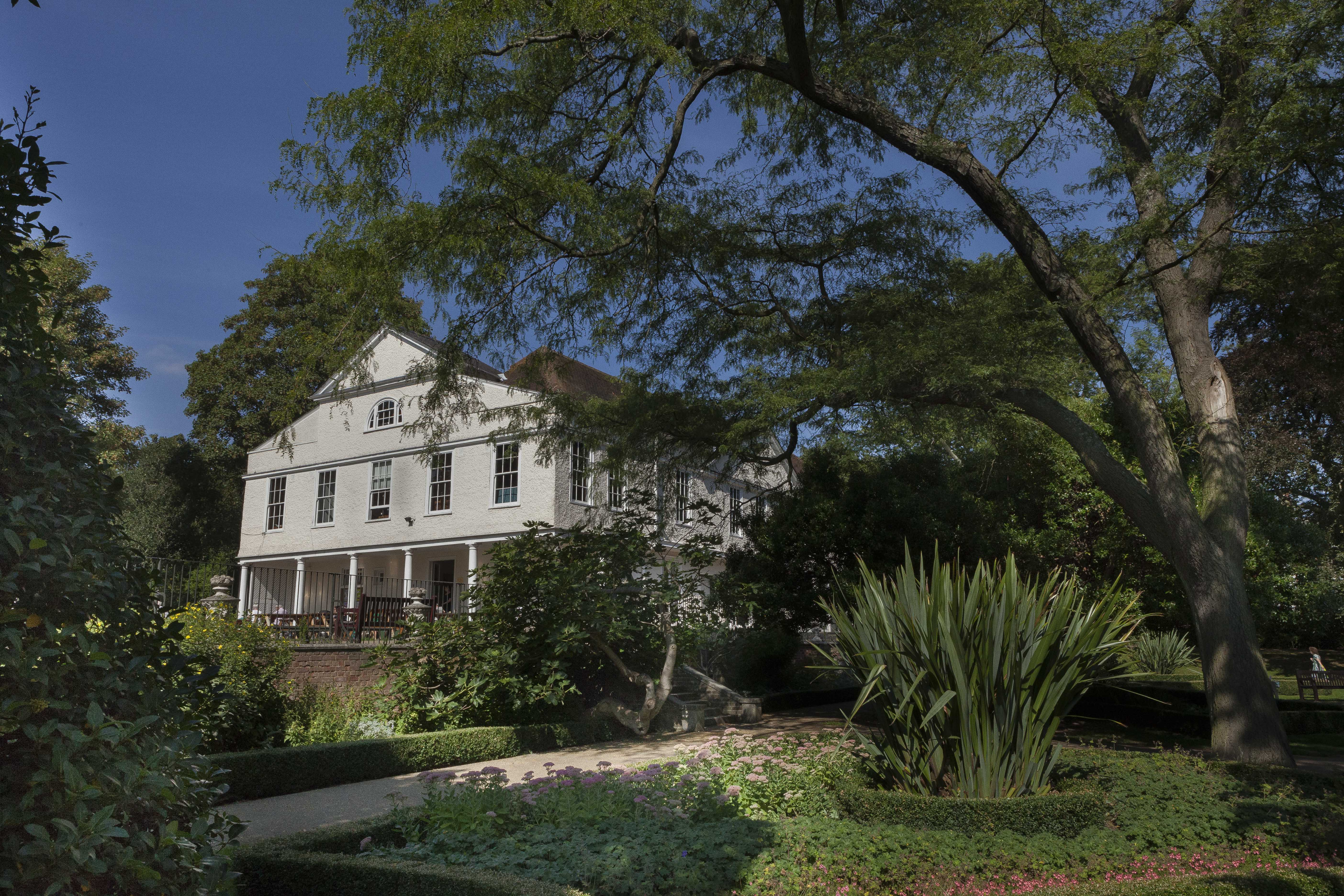
Anne Maitland inherited Lauderdale House from her mother

== Early life ==
Anne Home was a daughter of Mary (Dudley) Sutton, Countess of Home and Alexander Home, 1st Earl of Home.

She, or an older sister, was born and christened in 1612. Anne of Denmark sent instructions to the chamberlain of her Dunfermline estates, Henry Wardlaw of Pitreavie, to distribute presents of money at a baptism of the Countess' daughter, and Anna Hay, Countess of Winton was to be her representative.

As a child she lived in Old Moray House in Edinburgh. Her older sister Margaret Home married James Stuart, 4th Earl of Moray.

== Lady Lauderdale ==
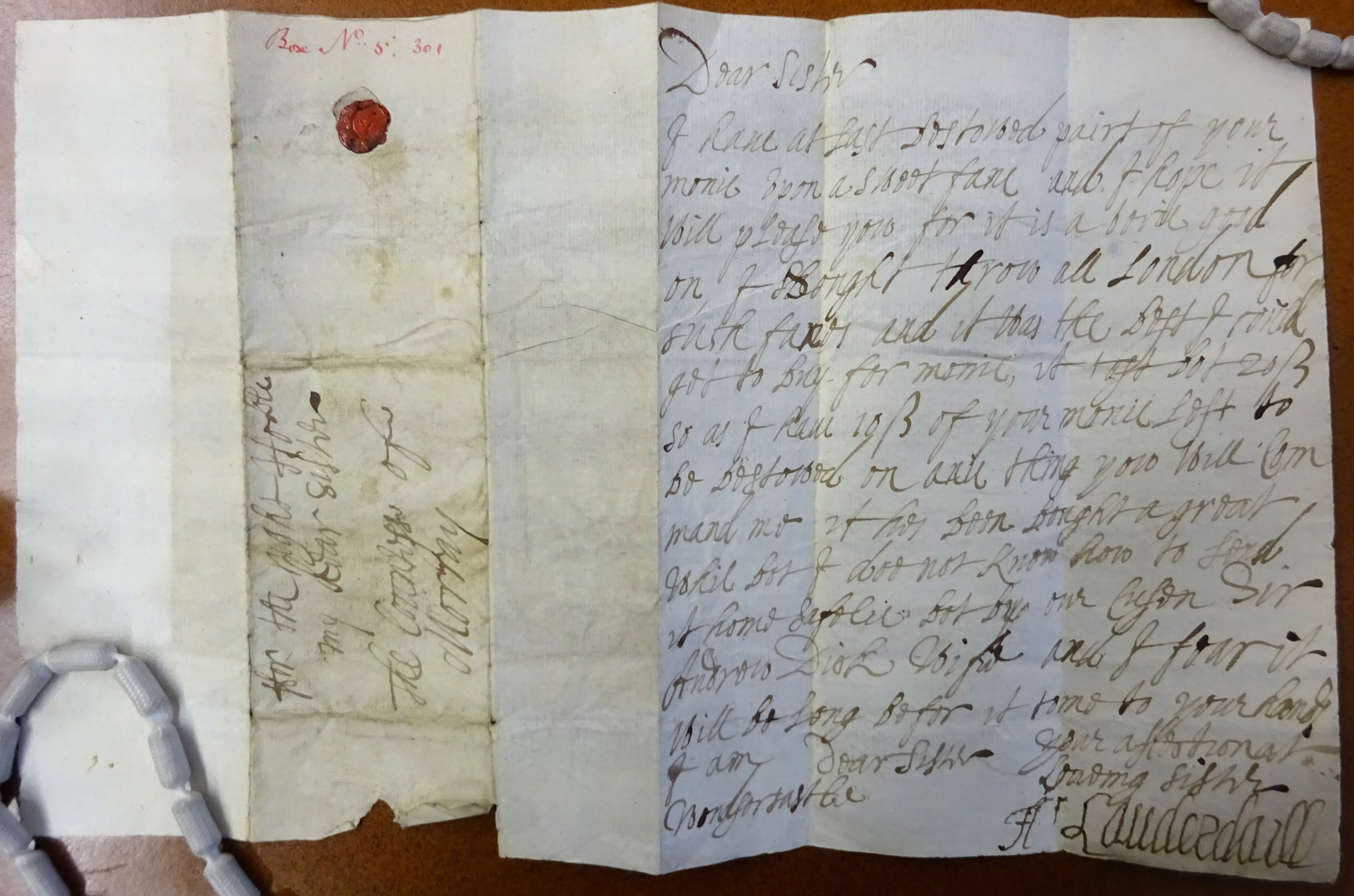
Letter from Anne Home, Countess of Lauderdale to her sister Margaret Home, Countess of Moray

She married John Maitland in 1632, son of John Maitland, 1st Earl of Lauderdale. She inherited her mother's property and furniture in London, and was in London in October 1648, hosting her grandmother Theodosia Harington.

In 1648 her husband was declared a delinquent and so their possessions and furniture in London were forfeited and sold. Counter-claims that the furnishings belonged to their daughter or had been sold to a Scottish merchant in London, Robert English, were disregarded. According to Bulstrode Whitelocke, officers from Haberdasher's Hall who came to collect Lauderdale's goods were resisted by a "file of musquetiers".

In the 1660s, she and her husband John Maitland, Earl of Lauderdale, lived in London on Aldersgate Street and Lauderdale House, Highgate, properties which had belonged to her mother. Near the end of the 18th century the coat of arms of Maitland and Home were discovered at Highgate during repairs to the building. Their main home in Scotland was Thirlestane Castle.

As a child, Anne had learned to play the virginals in Edinburgh. Samuel Pepys visited Highgate and heard Lauderdale say he did not much care for music.

In January 1662, Anne wrote to Sir John Gilmour of Craigmillar asking for his support in a lawsuit concerning the forfeited estate of a Quaker, John Swinton of Swinton. She signed this letter, "A. Lauderdaill".

They were lodged at Charing Cross in December 1668 and the Earl of Lauderdale's letters mention her illnesses, "much troubled with a cold", "much troubled with rheums", with swelling and pains to the face and throat. At the same time their infant grandson Charles Hay was ill with smallpox. His wet-nurse was given a posset drink of hartshorn with marigold flowers. Lauderdale was "most heartily weary" of a house filled with doctors and apothecaries. Perhaps in irony, Charles II took him to visit the physic laboratory of Nicasius le Febure in St James's Palace. Their second grandson John Hay was christened on 21 January 1669. Elizabeth, Lady Dysart's husband Lionel Tollemache died and Lauderdale visited her frequently in 1669.

Soon after she recovered from her illness Anne Home moved away from Lauderdale to Paris, on the advice of the king's physician Sir Alexander Fraser, so that she could take the waters at Bourbonne-les-Bains. Lauderdale sent her remittances from his lodging at court in Whitehall Palace. Lady Dysart made efforts to cover up her affair with Lauderdale by interfering with Anne Maitland's letters.

She wrote from Paris worrying about problems with her house at Highgate, at its core an Elizabethan building extended by her mother, which she called a "paper house". She thought Lauderdale's vast library had compromised the fabric.

I heir that the hous of Hayghat is laik to fal, that part of it that my mother built, I was allways afeired that the gret weight that wos in the head of the hous wold bring an old hous on my head and so I bilive you have heard me say for it was bot a peper hous and not able to indeur no gret weight. I would desir you that you would cause carry your bouks doune to some of the roums below, and that you would make some people that hes skill to see it, and that it may be repaired in time or els it will fall doune this winter. You know it tis mine but for my lifetime, and then come to your posterity, and that it is not my power to leave it from them, therefore I make no doubt of your repairing of it, and in special since your books has been the occasion of it.

Anne Home, Countess of Lauderdale died on 26 November 1671 in Paris. Her Scottish registered will values Lauderdale's library at £4,000, and their jewels at £48,000 Scots.

== Disputed jewels ==
Her husband married Elizabeth Murray, a daughter of William Murray, 1st Earl of Dysart in February 1672. Anne had bequeathed her jewels to their daughter Mary, Lady Tweeddale. The jewels were in the keeping of Lady Boghall, her companion in Paris. She had also thought of giving them to her first cousin Frederick Schomberg, 1st Duke of Schomberg for safe-keeping. She had made a will in Paris, witnessed by Frederick Schomberg and Jean Claude, Minister of Charenton, bequeathing the jewels to her daughter, Mary, Lady Yester. The validity of the will was challenged.

Lauderdale's agent in Paris, a Mr Waus who was shopping for the Countess of Dysart's wedding dress, obtained the jewels from Lady Boghall, and Lauderdale gave them to his new wife. Lawsuits over the jewels and the Tweeddale inheritance continued for several years.

== Marriage and family ==
In 1632 Anne Home married John Maitland, 1st Duke of Lauderdale, a son of John Maitland, 1st Earl of Lauderdale and Isabel Seton, a daughter of Alexander Seton, 1st Earl of Dunfermline and Lilias Drummond. Their children included:

- Mary Maitland, who married John Hay, 2nd Marquess of Tweeddale in December 1666 at Highgate. They lived at Lauderdale House. The Marquess of Tweeddale complained that the Duke of Lauderdale had taken her inheritance in 1672 to support his second wife, Elizabeth Maitland, Duchess of Lauderdale.
