= Sorbie Tower =

Coordinates: 54.79386°N 4.41138°W

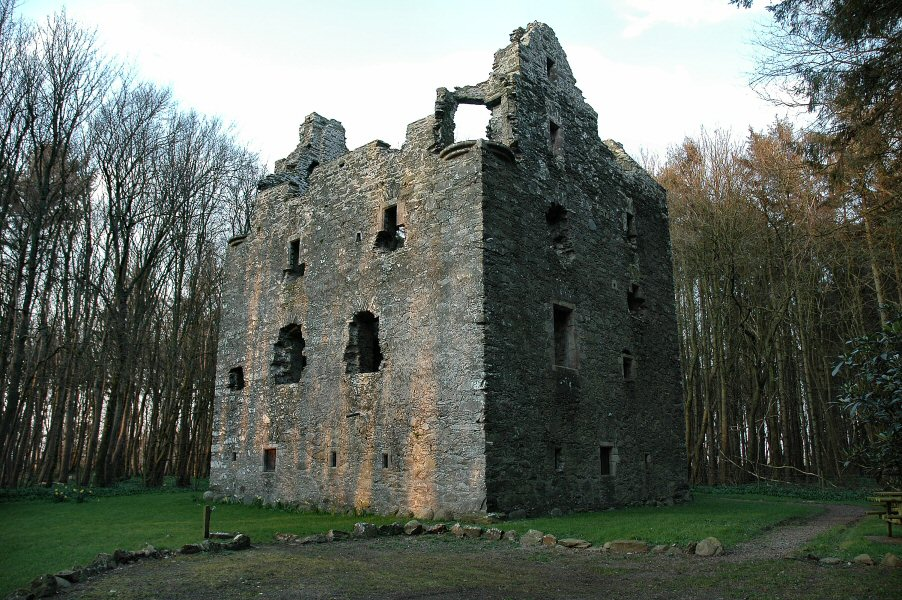
Sorbie Tower from the southwest.

Sorbie Tower is a fortified tower house 1 mile east of the village of Sorbie, Dumfries and Galloway, Scotland.

The ancient seat of the Clan Hannay, it is in an L-shaped format, rubble-built in the late sixteenth century, possibly by Patrick Hannay. The poet and courtier at the court of James VI, Patrick Hannay was a member of this family.

It was sold to the Earl of Galloway in 1677, and when the last of the line died in 1748 the tower became ruinous. It was given to the Clan Hannay by its owner in 1965.

It remains to second floor level, although notably for a building of this kind there is no wall-walk or parapet. It is a scheduled monument. There are plans to restore it.

The structure can be viewed both from the outside, free of charge, or, if you go to Garlieston Village and enquire within the village shop, you can go inside.
