= Patrick Hannay =

Scottish poet and courtier

Patrick Hannay (died 1630?) was a Scottish poet and courtier.

== Life ==
He was probably the third son of Alexander Hannay of Kirkdale in the Stewartry of Kirkcudbright. The Hannay family seat is Sorbie Tower in Wigtownshire. Early in the reign of James VI and I Patrick Hannay, with a cousin Robert (created a baronet of Nova Scotia in 1629), came to the English court and was favourably noticed by Queen Anne. Around 1620, both Patrick and Robert received grants of land in County Longford, Ireland, and in 1621 Patrick visited Sweden. After his return he received a clerkship in the office of the Irish privy council in Dublin. Attempts, which were for a time successful, were made to oust him from this post, but Charles I reinstated him in 1625 on the grounds of his foreign service and relationship with Queen Anne. In 1627, Hannay became master of chancery in Ireland. He is said to have died at sea in 1629, but records continue until 1630.

== Works ==
Hannay is mentioned in John Dunbar's Epigrammaton Centuriæ Sex, 1616. In 1618–19 appeared A Happy Husband; as with Richard Brathwaite's Good Wife accompanying it, the work was written in imitation of Thomas Overbury's Wife. Hannay dedicated A Happy Husband to Margaret Home daughter of Mary, Countess of Home. Rhyming couplets indicate the responsibilities of housewives. In 1619 Hannay published Two Elegies on the late death of our Soveraigne Queene Anne. With Epitaphes, with the title printed in white on a black ground.

Three years afterwards he republished the Happy Husband and the elegies, adding some new poems. The collective edition of 1622, The Nightingale. Sheretine and Mariana. A happy Husband. Elegies on the Death of Queen Anne. Songs and Sonnets, has the title within a border of thirteen compartments (engraved by Crispin de Pass), with two bars of music in the upper portion and the author's portrait below. Each of the five parts has a separate title-page. "The Nightingale", a poem in stanzas of sixteen lines, has a dedication to the Duchess of Lennox and commendatory verse by Robert Hannay, John Marshall, William Lithgow and others. ‘Sheretine and Mariana,’ a graceful narrative poem in six-line stanzas, is dedicated to the Countess of Bedford. Before the Songs and Sonnets there is a dedicatory epistle to a soldier under whom Hannay had served abroad, Sir Andrew Gray. In 1632 a copy of commendatory verses by him was prefixed to the first collected edition of William Lithgow's Travels. A facsimile reprint of the 1622 collection of Hannay's poems was issued in 1875 by the Hunterian Club, with a memoir of the author by David Laing.
