= Alexander Home, 1st Earl of Home =

Scottish nobleman

Alexander Home, 1st Earl of Home and 6th Lord Home (c. 1566 – 5 April 1619), was a Scottish nobleman and Lord Warden-general of all the March. He succeeded as the 6th Lord Home, a Lord of Parliament in the Peerage of Scotland, in 1575, and he was created Earl of Home in the Peerage of Scotland in 1605.

== Career ==
=== Early life ===
Born about 1566, he was son of Alexander Home, 5th Lord Home, by his second wife. On the death of his father in 1575 he was placed under the guardianship of Andrew Home, commendator of Jedburgh. The custody of the castle of Home had been committed by the Regent Morton to the widow of the fifth baron.

On 30 November 1578, she and her husband complained that the commendator refused to deliver it up. He was ordered to do so, but in December 1579 it was arranged that the castle should be retained by Lord Home and the commendator, his tutor, in his name. In 1581 Alexander Hume of Manderston and others were ordered to restore to Home certain lands. In July of the following year Home, as warden of the east marches, received a special commission to hold justiciary courts in his district.

Home and his family were often opposed to the Hepburns, a rival border family whose head was the Earl of Bothwell; the feud between the Homes and the Hepburns was an old one, and it may have been the main reason why Home's father sided with the enemies of Mary during the period of her intimacy with Bothwell. This enmity led to several quarrels between Home and Bothwell.

In February 1584 it was said that he was reconciled with Earl of Angus, after a quarrel about the lands of Cockburnspath, and wanted to marry a daughter of the Laird of Cessford (a sister of Robert Ker). James VI suggested instead he should marry Marie Stewart, the younger daughter of his favourite the Duke of Lennox, who was seven years old.

=== Ruthven raider ===
Home was one of those who signed the agreement which resulted in the Raid of Ruthven. In November 1583 a violent brawl occurred between him and Francis Stewart, 5th Earl of Bothwell, in the streets of Edinburgh. Both were ordered into ward, and Home was not released till 20 January 1585. For a time he was a prisoner in Tantallon Castle, but in December was transferred to Edinburgh Castle by way of the Nether Bow, so that he might see exposed there the head of one of his dependents, David Hume, captain of Stirling Castle.

=== Opposition to the Earl of Arran ===
Despite hereditary jealousy of Bothwell, and his earlier violent quarrel with him, Home, soon after obtaining his liberty, co-operated with him in the scheme for the restoration of the banished lords and the overthrow of Regent Arran. Along with Bothwell, he fortified Kelso Castle, which became the rendezvous of the insurgents. He was one of those received into favour by the king after Arran's fall. In the complaint of the kirk's commissioners to the king in 1587, he is mentioned as one of the "Papists and idolators" who had been promoted by the king. At the meeting of parliament in this year a quarrel occurred between Home and Lord Fleming on account of the latter being allowed by the council to vote before the other lords. Home challenged Fleming to a duel, but the combat was prevented by the citizens of Edinburgh, and the king subsequently reconciled them.

=== Rivalry with Bothwell ===
After the fall of Arran the old jealousy between Home and Bothwell broke out anew. When the king, in 1589, sailed to Denmark to convoy the Princess Anne to Scotland, they were specially charged to keep the peace towards each other. Home, however, for a time befriended Bothwell when that nobleman fell into disgrace with the king. On 7 January 1591, Home helped the Duke of Lennox attack John Wemyss of Logie, on Edinburgh High Street. He was banished from court for a short period. After Bothwell, on 22 June 1591, broke out of Edinburgh Castle, he dined the same evening with Home in Leith; and on account of his having openly joined Bothwell, proclamation was, on 2 August, made for his pursuit. Soon afterward he went to Blackness Castle, and was reported to have become an enemy of Bothwell.

In November 1592 Home offered his support against Bothwell and was rewarded with Priory of Coldingham. However, he quarrelled with Sir Robert Ker of Cessford who had been given property in Kelso for showing similar support. On 17 November 1592 Margaret Douglas, the heavily pregnant wife of the rebel Earl of Bothwell, kneeled on the street before James VI as he was going to Edinburgh Castle, and after Lord Home and Lord Lindsay spoke in her favour she was allowed to kiss the king's hand. The king then spoke harshly of her and her husband. She was applauded and carried back to her lodging by well-wishers.

=== A Catholic and the Kirk ===
On 17 November 1592 a convention of ministers sent a request to the king that he should remove Home, a professed papist, out of his company. The king consented to the appointment of a commission to inquire into such matters. On more stringent measures being threatened against the Catholics, Home, on 23 January 1593, appeared before the presbytery of Edinburgh, and, professing himself a Catholic, desired a conference. In June 1593 he assisted James Gray, brother of Patrick, master of Gray, in forcibly carrying off a young heiress, guarding the High Street with his retainers till the deed was accomplished. After Bothwell's interview with King James in Holyrood Palace in July of this year, the king, regarding himself as practically a prisoner, entered into communications with Home to aid him to escape to Falkland Palace, but the king's plan was discovered, and frustrated by Bothwell. Home was made captain of the king's bodyguard, and openly expressed his contempt for Bothwell.

Meantime, having failed to satisfy the demands of the Kirk, Home was on 25 September excommunicated by the synod of Fife. He remained in close company with the king, with whom he journeyed in October to Jedburgh. On 22 December he subscribed the confession of faith at the special instance of the ministers of Edinburgh; and in May 1594 he was, on promising to adhere to Protestantism, absolved from excommunication. In August 1594 he wore a Turkish costume and rode in a tournament celebrating the baptism of Prince Henry at Stirling Castle.

Jesuits like William Crichton continued to see Lord Home and Alexander Seton as significant Catholic courtiers and a route to the king, as they explored the idea of James VI as future king of England. Crichton introduced an English Catholic, Nicholas Williamson, to a student at Douai, David Law. Crichton intended that Law would introduce Williamson to Seton and take his letters to Home, but were both captured in March 1595 near Keswick and imprisoned in London.

=== Pursuit of Bothwell ===
On 27 March 1594, Home had received a commission to pursue Bothwell. A skirmish took place with Bothwell's men near Arthur's Seat, but Home was driven back by Bothwell's infantry. At the opening of the parliament in May he accompanied the king to the Tolbooth, riding on his left hand. At this parliament he was chosen a lord of the articles. After the banishment of Bothwell, his estates were divided chiefly among Home, Kerr of Cessford, and Scott of Buccleugh, Home obtaining Coldingham Priory.

In August 1594 he performed in the tournament at the baptism of Prince Henry at Stirling Castle dressed as a Turkish knight. As part of the Scottish royal baptism ceremony, the "Prince's Honours" were displayed. The Earl of Home carried a low crown suitable for a duke, set with diamonds, sapphires, emeralds and rubies into the Chapel Royal. The Master of Ceremonies, (possibly William Schaw), placed the crown on a table near the pulpit.

James VI came to Dunglass Castle in March 1596 for his "sports", which including coursing and hunting. The king alarmed the English garrison by coming to hunt near Berwick-upon-Tweed, staying a night the house of the laird of 'Beelleys', six miles from Berwick, and then returning to Dunglass.

In May 1596 an English paper listing reasons to suspect James VI of being a Roman Catholic, included the appointment of known Catholics to household offices, noting William Schaw the architect, Schaw's friend Alexander Seton as President of Council, and Home as Captain of the King's body guard. Home was one of the noblemen appointed in November 1596 to assist the lords of exchequer, and he was present with the king when he was besieged in the Tolbooth during the tumult of 18 December.

=== Last years ===
In May 1598, Home burnt the Tolbooth of Lauder and killed a prisoner, William Lauder. This Lauder had killed John Cranston, who had killed his father at Linlithgow. This angered Home because Cranston was killed while in the company of his sister Margaret, the Countess Marischal. The Presbytery of Haddington excommunicated Home for this crime. This was not pleasing to James VI as he planned to forgive Home at the intercession of the Duke of Holstein, the brother of Anne of Denmark who was in Scotland at the time.

In April 1599, Home went abroad, it was said he travelled for his health because he was "sore grieved with the French pox", He took a gift of as many as eleven horses to the King of France. Home returned via London. Rowland Whyte reported that he came to court only to kiss the hand of Elizabeth I.

He resigned the office of warden of the east marches, which was bestowed on Sir Alexander Home of Manderston. He and others were summoned to appear on 11 August 1600 at Falkland Palace on pain of rebellion. Home obeyed the summons. In the following year he and other nobles who had previously been Catholics were subjected to more stringent superintendence by the authorities of the kirk; but the commissioner appointed to wait on Home reported that he was out of the country.

Home was one of the retinue who in 1603 accompanied King James to England on his accession to the English throne, the king on his way staying for a night at Home's castle of Dunglass. In London he accompanied the French ambassador, Maximilien de Béthune, Duke of Sully, on his trips to Greenwich Palace by boat. On 7 July the king constituted him lieutenant and justiciary over the three marches. He was also sworn a privy councillor of England. On 4 March 1605 was created Earl of Home and Lord Dunglass.

Suspected again of Roman Catholicism, and involvement in the Gunpowder Plot, Home was ordered in 1606 to confine himself in Edinburgh.

King James decided to visit Scotland in 1617. Home and his followers were directed by the Privy Council to meet him and convey him to Dunglass Castle and then to Pencraig near Linton Bridge.

Alexander, Earl of Home died in London on 5 April 1619.

== Family ==
In March 1586, Lord Home married Christian, daughter of the 6th Earl of Morton and widow of Laurence, Master of Oliphant. She died without surviving issue by Home. Some records of her household survive including a bill from an Edinburgh merchant for textiles for her gowns in 1589 and 1590, made by an Edinburgh tailor, Peter Sanderson.

Lord Home and Christian had some disagreements, according to the English diplomat George Nicholson, who wrote of a separation in October 1595 when Christian carried plate and household stuff from Dunglass Castle to a house in Fife belonging to the Oliphant family.

His second wife was Mary Dudley Sutton, eldest daughter of the 5th Baron Dudley, the son of the English keeper of Home Castle in 1547 during the Rough Wooing. They married at Bedford House on the Strand on 11 July 1605. Their children included:

- James Home, 2nd Earl of Home
- Margaret Home, who married the 4th Earl of Moray
- Anne Home, who married the 1st Duke of Lauderdale.

His widow, Mary, Dowager Countess of Home, built Moray House in Edinburgh's Canongate.

== Notes ==
Peerage of Scotland
New creation	Earl of Home; 1605–1619	Succeeded by James Home
Preceded by Alexander Home	Lord Home; 1575–1619	Succeeded by James Home

Attribution

This article incorporates text from a publication now in the public domain: Lee, Sidney, ed. (1891). "Home, Alexander (1566?-1619)". Dictionary of National Biography. Vol. 27. London: Smith, Elder & Co.
