= Mary Mildmay Fane, Countess of Westmorland =

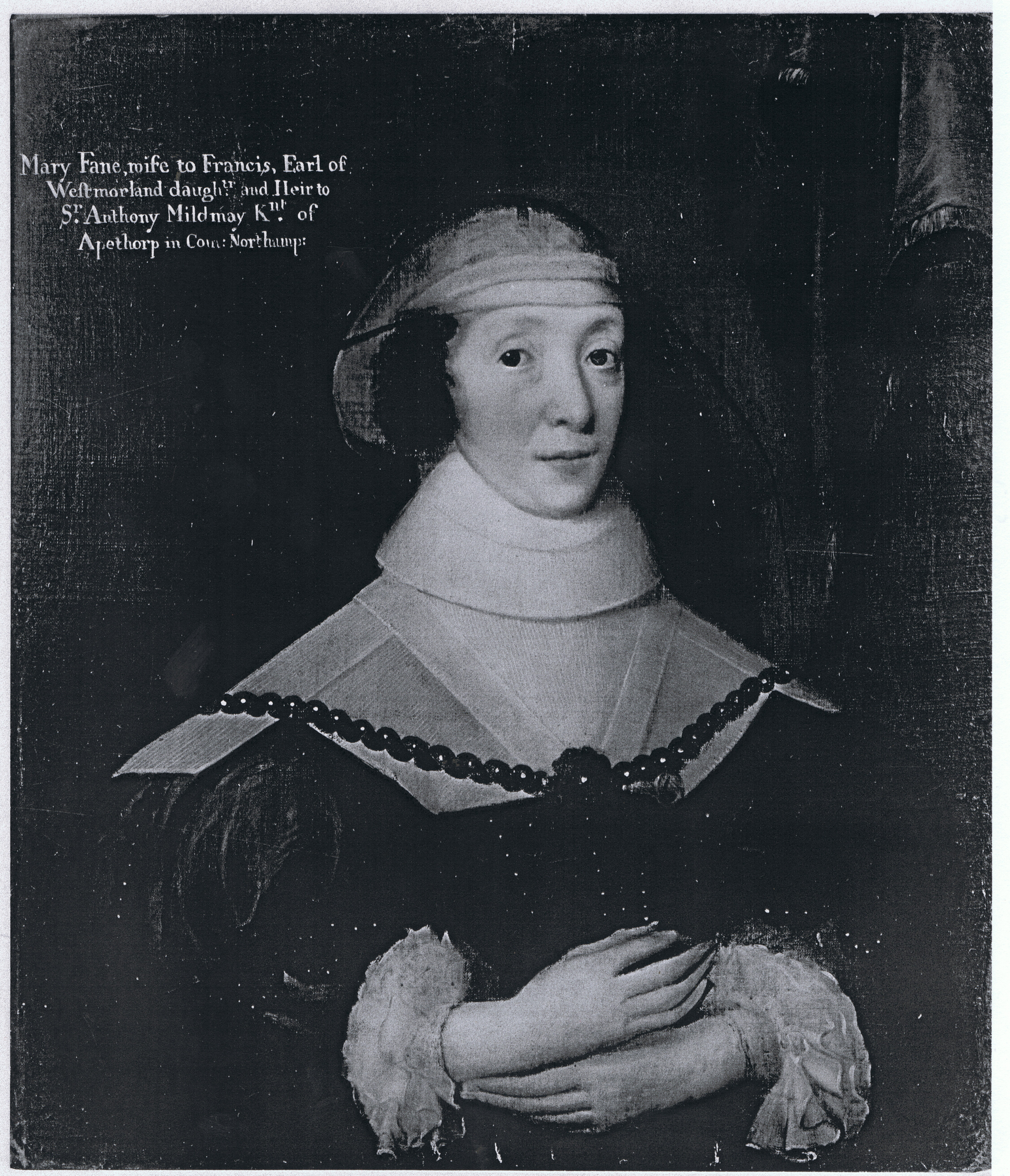
Mary, Countess of Westmorland

Mary Fane, Countess of Westmorland (née Mildmay; c. 1582 – 9 April 1640) continued her mother Grace Mildmay's interest in physic and was a significant author of spiritual guidance and writer of letters.

== Family background ==
Mary was the daughter and eventual sole heiress of Sir Anthony Mildmay (d. 1617), of Apethorpe Hall, Northamptonshire, and Grace Sherington (1552–1620), who was daughter and co-heir of Sir Henry Sherington (alias Sharington) (c. 1518-1581) of Lacock Abbey, Wiltshire. Mary built an imposing monument to her parents at Apethorpe Church in 1621, the sculpture attributed to Maximilian Colt.

On 15 February 1598/99, Mary married Francis Fane, and he became the Earl of Westmorland. They lived at Apethorpe and in London, at the Old Savoy.

== Writing and Letters ==
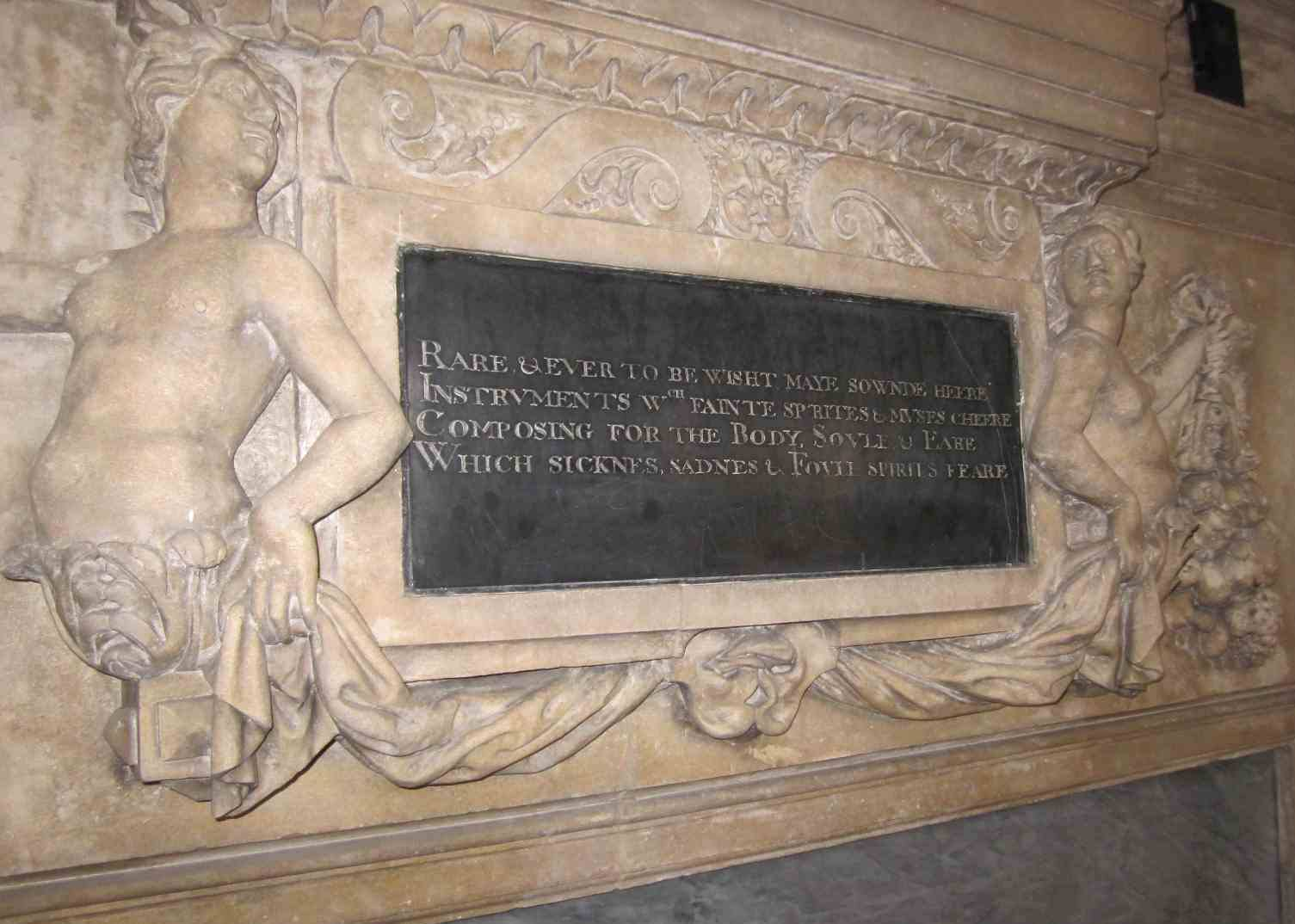
Marble overmantle in the gallery at Apethorpe.

Mary Mildmay Fane collated and transcribed her mother's medical works, a bequest of over 2,000 sheets of paper. Grace had dedicated her volume of 'Spiritual Meditations' to Mary, writing of scripture as a gift to "Mary, the Lady Fane, wife of the Honourable Knight, Sir Francis Fane". Mary later passed this blessing to her newly married daughter Grace, Countess of Home, in a letter of January 1627. She is thought to have composed the verse carved on the long gallery mantelpiece at Apethorpe:

Rare & ever to be wisht maye sownde heere
Instruments w[hi]ch fainte sp[i]rites & muses cheere
Composing for the Body, Soul, and Eare
Which sicknes, sadnes, & Foule spirits feare

Mary wrote a 'Book of Advices to the Children' for her sons Francis and Mildmay. She encouraged her children to write and perform in domestic theatre, including The May Masque at Apethorpe. The Countess wrote letters of advice to her son Francis Fane. Five were copied into his commonplace book. Other surviving letters include a group of business letters sent to Emmanuel College, Cambridge, six letters to her daughter Grace Fane, Countess of Home, concerning her health and hopes of pregnancy, and a number of letters of petition to Viscount Dorchester and others. She wrote to Dorchester in July 1631 asking for advice about a tutor for her son Francis during his tour in Europe. Her handwriting includes a distinctive ampersand, which also appears in her daughters' writings.

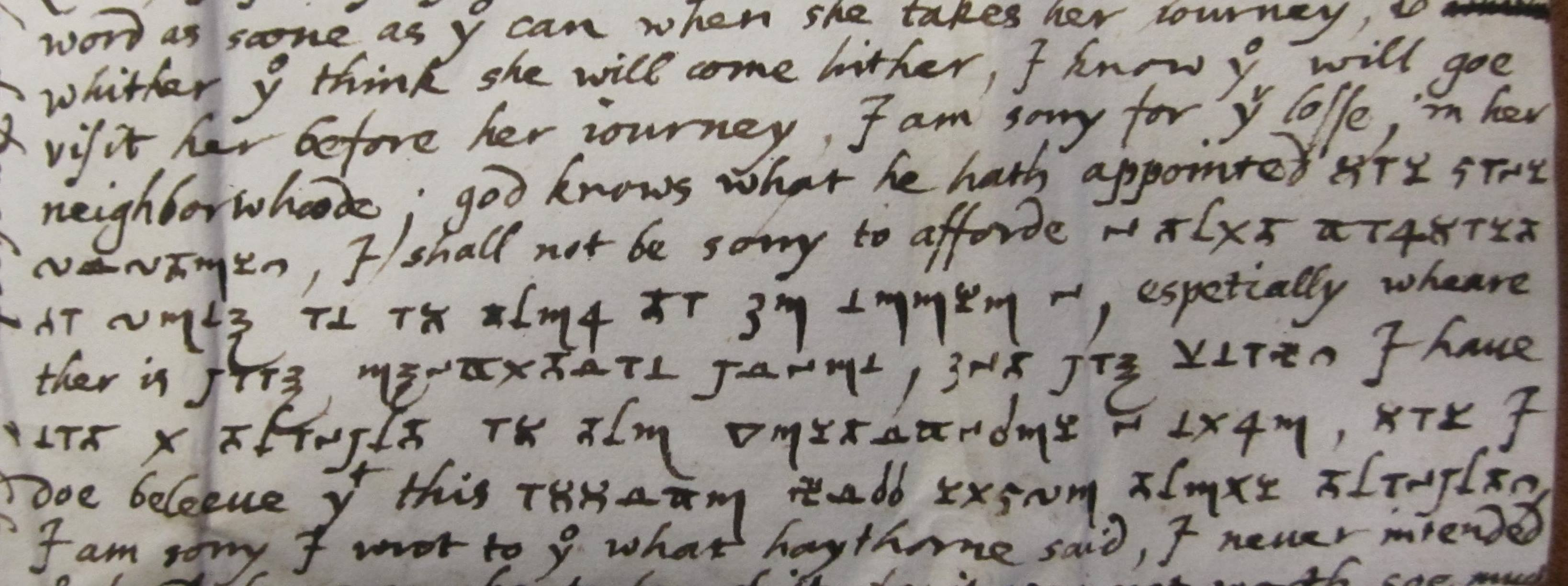
Detail of a letter from the Countess of Westmorland to her daughter Grace, Countess of Home, with cipher code

After her daughter, Grace, Countess of Home died at Apethorpe in 1633, as her executrix, the Countess of Westmorland disputed her property with the Mary, the dowager Countess of Home. She obtained the favour of Charles I, who wrote to the Court of Session in Edinburgh on her behalf on 5 May 1634. On December 1635 she wrote to Secretary Windebank thanking him for royal letters sent in her favour and asking him to prevent the king taking the side of her adversary, the Countess of Home, who was then in London. Westmorland explained that Home had the advantage of continual residence and acquaintance in Edinburgh. She asked him to keep her business secret.

=== A very sensible and prophetic letter ===
On 6 May 1639 Mary wrote a letter to Secretary Windebank advising against sending an army to Scotland in the first Bishop's War. The letter has sometimes been attributed to her daughter-in-law, Mary Vere. A later reader endorsed it as, "A very sencible and Prophetick letter". She wrote that the Scots were better prepared and better suited for war;

"The Scots have many spies which flock about the King; and they cannot but know how the state of this kingdom stands, and be encouraged, knowing how uncertainly a war will be maintained, which is to be maintained out of prerogative, imposition, and voluntary contributions. They know our divisions, and the state of their own combination; and that they have a party amongst us, and that we have none amongst them, and they are a people that can live of nothing, and we, that can want nothing without discontentment and mutiny, and our men and horses so unused to war, that if his majesty attempt any thing before they be better exercised, the dishonour is likely to be increased ...
They say the women in Scotland are the chief stirrers of this war. I think it not so shameful for women of England to wish well to the peace of these nations, whether it be by word or writing; yet I pray you, when you read this letter, to burn it, that it might not rise up in any body's judgement but yours, against me, to tax my zeal with ignorance, who would willingly sacrifice my own life to the quenching of this fire."

Writing to her daughter Rachel Fane on 9 January 1640, Mary, now dowager countess, called herself an old hen, her daughter Katherine a chick, and praised Mary Vere; "the olde hen left at home, with her best chick, my daughter of Westmorland hath proved a good Christmas woman & has made on, & allowed of much mirth".

== Death ==
Mary died at Stevenage on 9 April 1640 and was buried at Apethorpe. She was 59 years old.

== Family and Children ==
Mary and Francis had seven sons and six daughters:

=== Sons ===
- Mildmay Fane, 2nd Earl of Westmorland (24 January 1602 – 12 February 1666), a poet and Member of Parliament.
- Thomas Fane, died in infancy
- Francis Fane (c. 1611–1681?) of Fulbeck. He was a Royalist governor of Doncaster, and afterwards of Lincoln Castle. He was the great-grandfather of Thomas Fane, 8th Earl of Westmorland.
- Anthony Fane (1613–1643), a colonel in the Parliamentary army, who was injured at the siege of Farnham Castle on 9 December 1642 and died at his home in Kingston upon Thames early the following year.
- Colonel George Fane (c. 1616 – April 1663), a Royalist officer and later Member of Parliament.
- William Fane
- Robert Fane

=== Daughters ===
- Grace Fane (1604-1633), who married James Home, 2nd Earl of Home (died 1633).
- Mary Fane (1606-1634) married, after 18 May 1625, Dutton Gerard, 3rd Baron Gerard (1613-1640), grandson of Thomas Gerard, 1st Baron Gerard
- Elizabeth Fane (b. 1608), who married John Cope, and secondly William Cope, by whom she was grandmother of Sir John Cope
- Rachel Fane (1614-1681), who married Henry Bourchier, 5th Earl of Bath (1593-1654), of Tawstock Court, Devon.
- Frances Fane. Died unmarried, some time before 9 April 1640.
- Catherine Fane.
