= Lauderdale House =

House in Waterlow Park, Highgate, London

Coordinates: 51°34′9″N 0°8′36″W

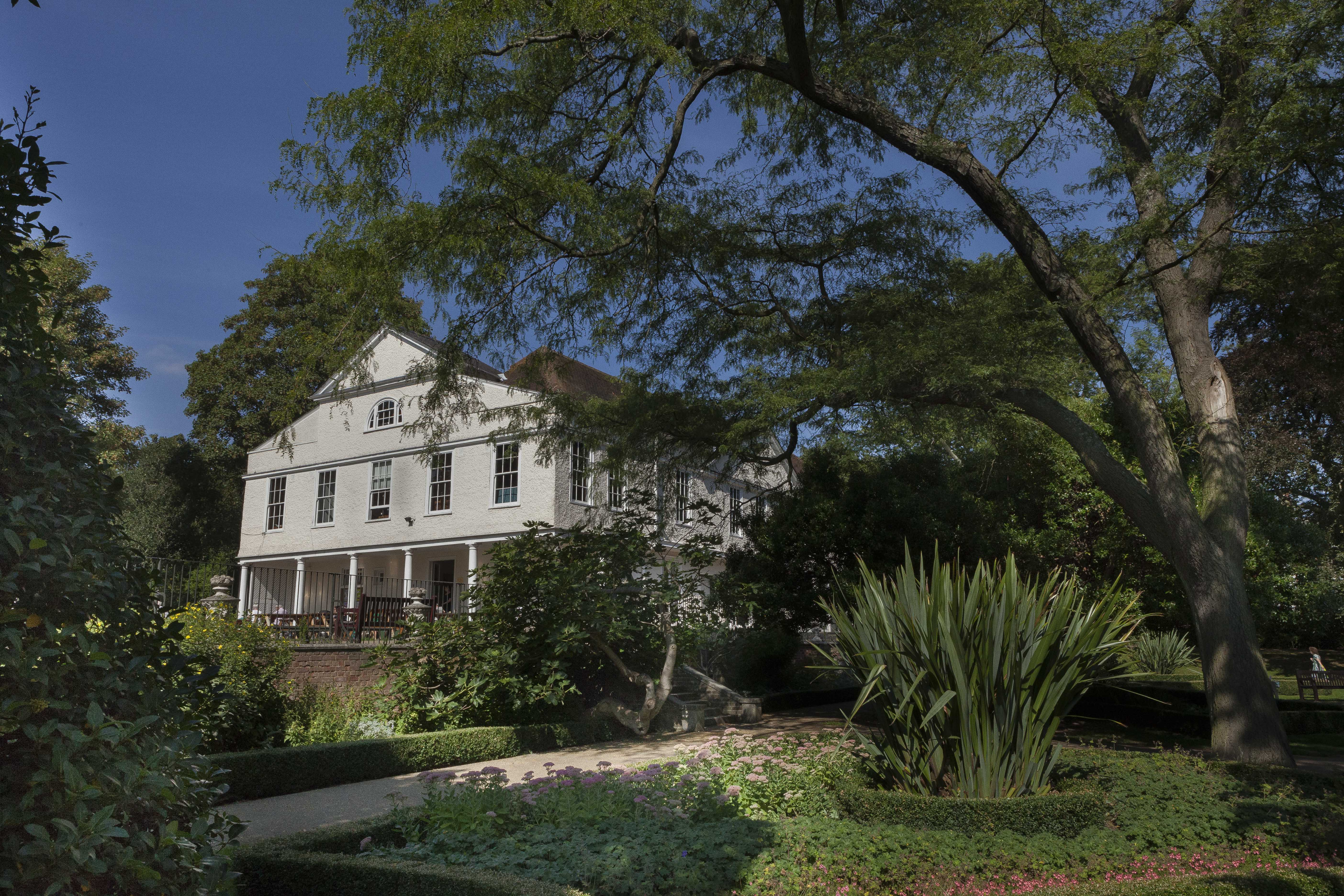
Lauderdale House

Lauderdale House is an historic house, now run as an arts and education centre, based in Waterlow Park, Highgate in north London, England.

== History ==
Lauderdale House was one of the finest country houses in Highgate and was originally built for Richard Martin (Lord Mayor of London) in 1582 with a timber frame. In the early 17th Century it was occupied by Sir Henry Hobart, who in 1616 had built Blickling Hall, Norfolk, now a National Trust property. The house was bought by Henrietta Maria's silkman William Geere, who sold it to Mary, Countess of Home. She extended the house. In 1645 it came to Earl of Lauderdale (hence its name) as his wife Anne Home's inheritance. She thought the weight of Lauderdale's extensive library might damage the house. The library was worth £4,000 according to an estimate in her will.

In 1666, Lauderdale House was visited by Charles II and Samuel Pepys, while Nell Gwyn is said to have lived there briefly in 1670. It was later the home of the Lord Mayor of London, Sir William Pritchard.

It was converted to a neoclassical style in 1760, and John Wesley preached here in 1782. For some time it was the home of James Yates, antiquary and Unitarian, who retired there to spend years of "learned leisure" amidst "a noble library and a fine collection of works of art". He died there in 1871. The house became a convalescent home for St. Bartholomew's hospital in 1872.

In 1882 the then owner, Sir Sydney Waterlow, the famous printer, donated it 'for the enjoyment of Londoners'. It is a Grade II* listed building.

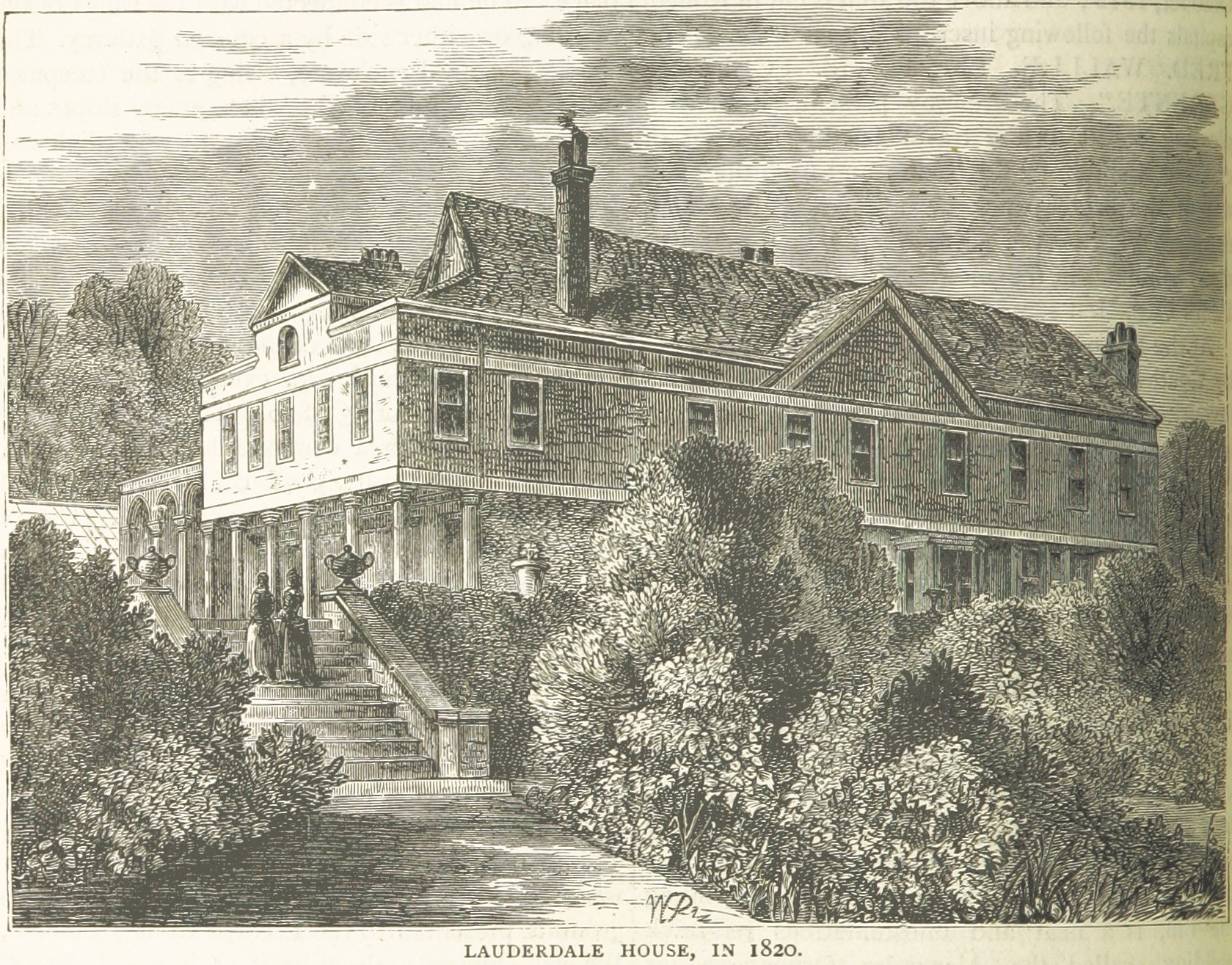
The house in 1820
