= James Home, 3rd Earl of Home =

Scottish Aristocrat

James Home, 3rd Earl of Home (died 1666) was a Scottish courtier and landowner.

He was the son of Sir James Home of Whitriggs and Anne Home, daughter of George Home, 1st Earl of Dunbar and Elizabeth Gordon, daughter of Alexander Gordon of Gight and Agnes Beaton, daughter of Cardinal David Beaton, Archbishop of St. Andrews, and Marion Ogilvy.

He was known as Sir James Home of Whitriggs and Coldenknowes. His father was the son of Sir John Home and Marie Sinclair, daughter of Jean Hepburn and John Sinclair, Master of Caithness. They were contracted to marry in 1602, and Lord Home, who had no children at that time, promised Sir John Home the lordship of Home. At that time it was thought the marriage might effect the rehabilitation of Francis Stewart, 5th Earl of Bothwell, who was the young husband's great uncle.

Coldenknowes, or Cowdenknowes, was a Scottish barony east of the Leader Water, 32 miles southeast of Edinburgh in Berwickshire. It belonged to his grandfather, John Home who married secondly Beatrix Ruthven a daughter of William Ruthven, 1st Earl of Gowrie.

He was made Earl of Home after the death of his cousin, James Home, 2nd Earl of Home in 1633.

== Family ==
He married Jean Douglas (d. 1694), a daughter of William Douglas, 7th Earl of Morton and Anne Keith, a daughter of George Keith, 5th Earl Marischal: Their children included:

- Alexander Home, 4th Earl of Home, appointed a Gentleman of the Bedchamber to Charles II of England in 1671.
- James Home, 5th Earl of Home
- Charles Home, 6th Earl of Home
- William Home, Sheriff-depute of Berwickshire.
- Isabel Home

Peerage of Scotland
Preceded by James Home	Earl of Home; 1633–1666	Succeeded by Alexander Home
