= James Home, 2nd Earl of Home =

James Home, 2nd Earl of Home (died 1633) was a Scottish nobleman. Surviving records of his life and the health of his family are of interest to historians.

== Biography ==
James was the son of Alexander Home, 1st Earl of Home and Mary, Countess of Home. Known as "Lord Dunglass", he became Earl of Home when his father died in London in April 1619. His mother wrote to James I on his behalf in negotiations over the properties formerly belonging to Francis Stewart, 5th Earl of Bothwell. The Earl of Home attended the funeral of James VI and I at Westminster Abbey on 7 May 1625.

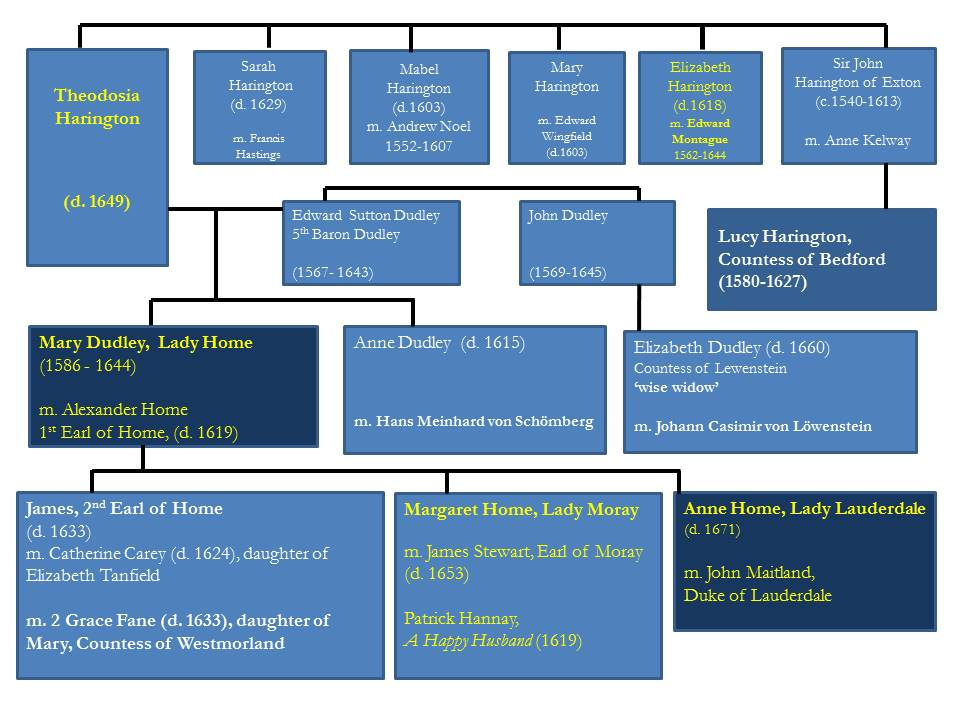
Harington Dudley connections

=== First marriage ===
James married firstly, Catherine Cary (1609–1626) eldest daughter of Viscount Falkland and the playwright Elizabeth Tanfield Cary author of The Tragedy of Mariam. John Chamberlain reported that King James had arranged the marriage which took place in the King's chamber or presence chamber at Whitehall Palace in May 1622. The king wanted the marriage concluded before Viscount Falkland become Lord Deputy of Ireland. In Scotland, on the king's orders, the lawyer Thomas Hamilton had convened the six lairds of the Home name; Wedderburn, Ayton, Blackadder, Polwarth, Manderston, Hutton Hall, and North Berwick. He told them the details of the earl's marriage, and that King James wished them to be "instruments of peace and love between him and his lady." The lairds hoped that Home's mother would consult with them about the earl's business and consider their advice. Otherwise they would not be content to intervene in the earl's affairs.

Friends of Elizabeth, Lady Falkland, who may have supported the marriage plans, include Mary, Countess of Buckingham, and mother of the royal favourite, the Duke of Buckingham, her stepmother Cecily, Lady Manners, wife of Francis Manners, 6th Earl of Rutland, and Margaret Butler, Viscountess Mountgarret.

=== Health ===
In December 1622, the Earl of Home had a serious infection in the mouth, and his wife also had a tooth pulled out. The Life of Lady Falkland relates that Catherine, Countess of Home, had a religious vision in Scotland. Catherine's death in childbirth in 1625 and the vision were said to have caused her mother's conversion to Catholicism.

One of Catherine's maids, Bessie Poulter, returned to England to serve Lady Falkland and was said to have been affected by preaching about witchcraft and Catholic priests in Scotland.

=== Family life ===
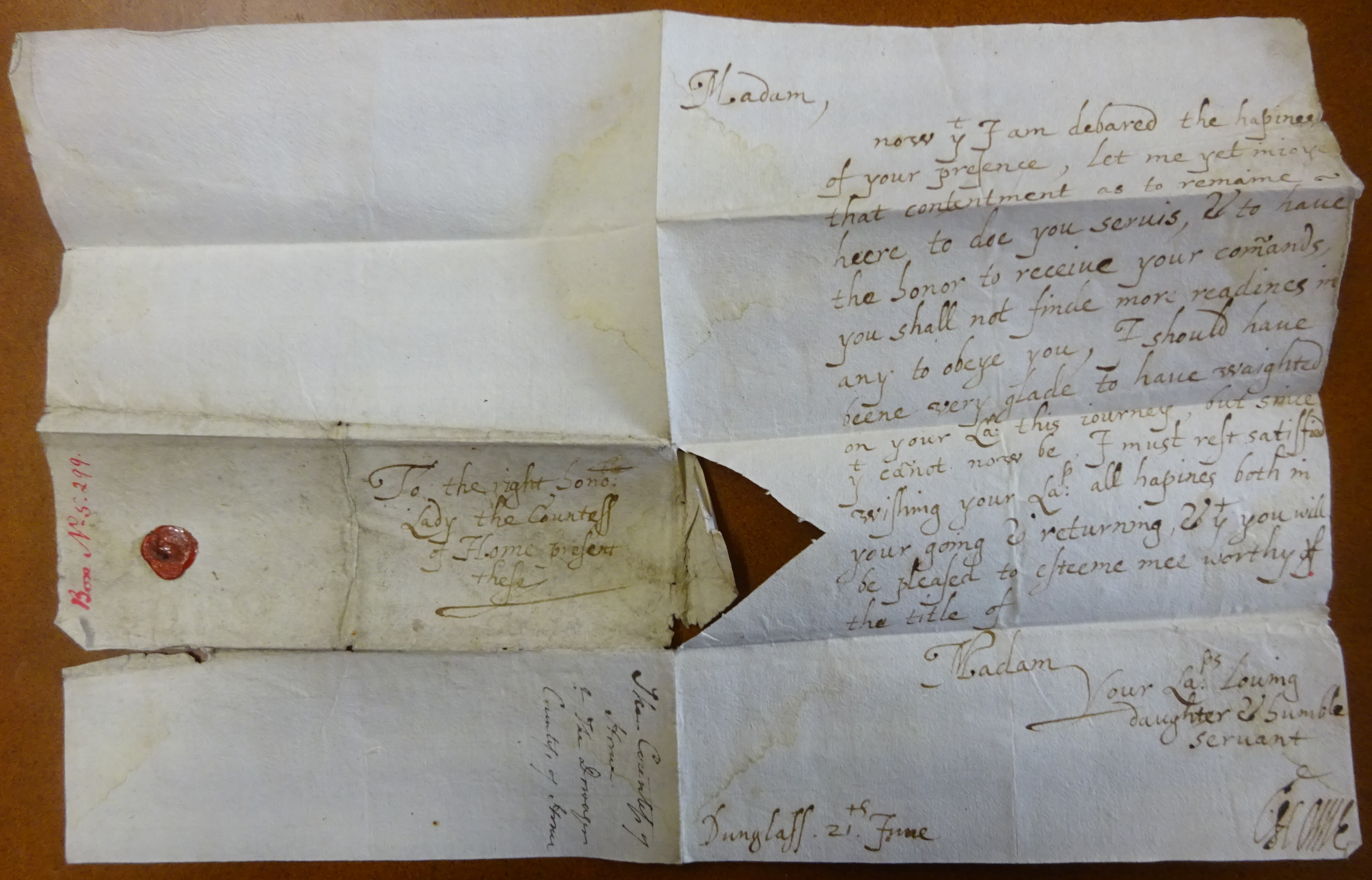
Letter from Grace Fane, Countess of Home to her mother-in-law, Mary, Countess of Home

In May 1626, James married Grace Fane (d. 1633), eldest daughter of Francis Fane, 1st Earl of Westmorland and Mary Mildmay. She also had connections with the Villiers family. Her mother, Mary Mildmay Fane, Countess of Westmorland, wrote letters to her in Scotland with family news and concerns for her health. The Countess of Westmorland discussed Grace's problems in conceiving a child with a midwife called "Mrs Cudbert" and wrote that Grace should discuss her health with those in her household who had children of their own.

James Home travelled to England for business and pleasure. An account of expenses mentions his dogs and his horse "Sweepstakes" and money in gold sent to England for his expenses or investment.

== Death ==
James died in London in his lodging in St Martin's Lane without an heir on 13 February 1633, attended by the court physician Théodore de Mayerne, and Grace died soon afterwards at Apethorpe. The next Earl of Home was his cousin Sir James Home of Coldenknowes.

Peerage of Scotland
Preceded by Alexander Home	Earl of Home; 1619–1633	Succeeded by James Home
