= Clan Home =

Scottish clan

- Crest: On a cap of maintenance Proper, a lion's head erased Argent
- Motto: True to the End
- Slogan: A Home, A Home, A Home

Profile
- Region: Borders
- District: Berwickshire
- Plant badge: Broom

Chief
- Michael David Alexander Douglas-Home, 16th Earl of Home
- Earl of Home
- Seat: The Hirsel
- Historic seat: Hume Castle; Fast Castle
Septs of Clan Home
Ayton, Aytoun, Aiton, Blackadder, Buccles, Buglass, Bugloss, Buikles, Bukeles, Buncle, Bunkle, Dunbar, Eaton, Greenlaw, Greenlee, Greenlees, Greenley, Grindlay, Grindley, Haliburton, Halliburton, Halyburton, Hewme, Hom, Hoom, Hoome, Houm, Houme, Hum, Huym, Landels, Lansdale, Mack, Paxton, Nesbit, Nesbitt, Nisbet, Trotter, Trotters, Wedderburn
Clan branches
- Home of Wedderburn (senior cadets)
- Home of Blackadder
- Home of Broomhouse
- Home of Coldingknows
- Home of Lumdane
- Home of Manderston
- Home of North Berwick
- Home of Polwarth
- Home of Renton
- Home of Simprim
- Home of Wormleybury

Clan Home (pronounced and sometimes spelt Hume) is a Scottish clan. It held immense power for much of the Middle Ages and dominated the eastern Scottish Border country. It produced no fewer than eight Wardens of the Eastern March, more than any other family.

== History ==
=== Origins of the clan ===
The Home family traces its male-line descent from Cospatric I (died after 1073), the Anglo-Celtic Earl of Northumbria. His descendant, William of Home (son of Sir Patrick of Greenlaw, the second son of Cospatric III, Earl of Lothian), adopted the surname following his acquisition of the lands of Home in Berwickshire in the early 13th century, through his marriage to his second cousin Ada (the daughter of Patrick I, Earl of Dunbar). William's arms featured the silver lion of Dunbar but with a green field instead of a red field, in reference to his lands of Greenlaw.

In the 14th century, William's descendant, Sir Thomas Home of that Ilk, married Nichola (also Nicola), heiress to the Pepdies of Dunglass. Through this marriage, the Homes acquired the lands of Dunglass, where they built Dunglass Collegiate Church (still extant today), and began quartering their arms with those of Pepdie, being three green papingoes 'parrots' in a silver field. This quartering is one of the earliest examples in Scottish heraldry.

Sir Thomas and Nichola had two sons. The first, Alexander, succeeded to the chieftaincy of the family, while the second, David, founded the family's principle cadet branch, the Homes of Wedderburn.

=== 15th century ===
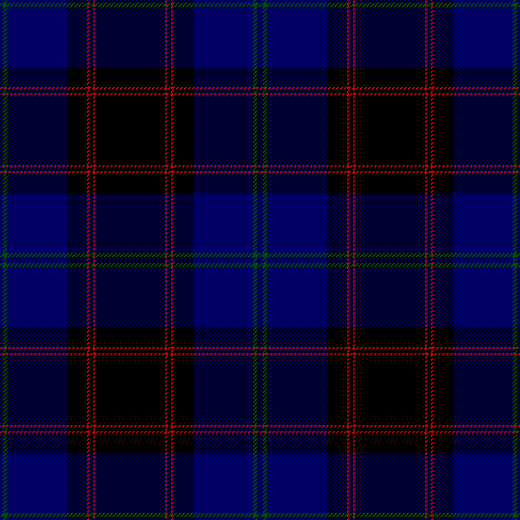
Home tartan, as published in 1842 in Vestiarium Scoticum.

In 1402, Sir Alexander Home of that Ilk and of Dunglass was captured at the Battle of Homildon Hill. Later he followed the Earl of Douglas to France but was killed in the Battle of Verneuil in 1424. Most of the principal cadet branches of the clan are descended from his three sons. In 1473, his eldest grandson Sir Alexander was created a Lord of Parliament as Lord Home, and appointed a Warden of the Eastern March in c. 1475. In 1488, his grandson Alexander joined Prince James' rebellion against his father King James III, and had a commanding role in the Battle of Sauchieburn, which resulted in the death of the king. Following the battle, he was made a privy councillor and the Great Chamberlain. He succeeded his grandfather as 2nd Lord Home.

=== 16th century ===
Alexander Home, 3rd Lord Home was appointed Lord Warden General in c. 1510. In 1513, he and his followers formed part of the army levied by King James IV to invade England. Lord Home led the vanguard of Scottish knights at the Battle of Flodden, and while he was fortunate enough to escape the slaughter, many of his family and supporters did not. Home was later appointed as one of the counsellors to the queen regent. However, the fortunes of the Homes suffered when the regency was transferred to the Duke of Albany. Lord Home was arrested for treason after being accused of conspiring with the English, and he and his brother were executed in October 1516. Their heads were then displayed on Edinburgh Tolbooth.

The title and estates were later restored to another brother, George Home, 4th Lord Home. On several occasions, he led Border spearmen against the English. However, he was thrown from his horse and died from his injuries on the eve of the Battle of Pinkie Cleugh in 1547. The Home lands were occupied by the English, but his son, Alexander Home, 5th Lord Home, retook them in 1549. He also supported the Scottish Reformation and sat in the Parliament of 1560 that passed the Protestant Confession of Faith.

During the politics of Mary, Queen of Scots, the Homes, like many others, shifted their allegiance more than once. Lord Home had supported the marriage of the Earl of Bothwell to Mary but he later led his men at the Battle of Langside against the queen. Then in 1573, he was arrested and convicted of treason against the young James VI of Scotland. He was released from Edinburgh Castle only after his health had failed, dying a few days later. His son, Alexander, the 6th Lord Home, a devoted supporter of James VI, served as ambassador to France multiple times.

=== 17th century and civil war ===
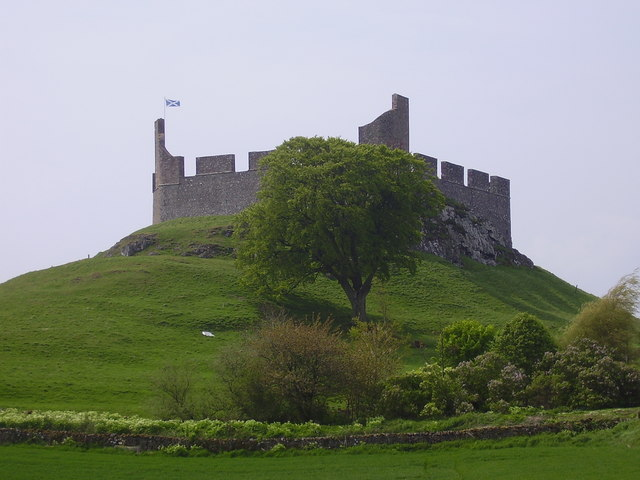
Hume Castle was the original seat of the chiefs of Clan Home

When James VI travelled to England to take possession of his new kingdom in 1603 as James I of England, he stopped at Dunglass Castle, and Lord Home accompanied him to London. Home was raised to the title of Earl of Home in March 1605.

James Home, 3rd Earl of Home was a staunch supporter of King Charles I. In 1648, he was colonel of the Berwickshire Regiment of Foot. In 1650, when Oliver Cromwell invaded Scotland, he made a point of seizing Home's castle, which was then garrisoned by parliament's troops.

=== 18th century and Jacobite risings ===
The Homes also changed sides during the Jacobite risings of the 18th century. During the Jacobite rising of 1715, the 7th Earl of Home was imprisoned in Edinburgh Castle. His brother, James Home of Ayton, had his estates confiscated for his part in the rebellion.

During the Jacobite rising of 1745, William Home, 8th Earl of Home joined British government forces under Sir John Cope at Dunbar. He later fought at the Battle of Prestonpans. The earl rose to the rank of lieutenant general and was appointed governor of Gibraltar, where he died in 1761.

Henry Home, Lord Kames, a prominent 18th-century Scottish lawyer, published influential works on Scots law, such as Principles of Equity, which remain highly regarded. David Hume, a preeminent Scottish philosopher of the 18th century, is renowned for works like A Treatise of Human Nature.

=== 20th century ===
The Home family achieved political prominence in the 20th century when the 14th Earl, Alec Douglas-Home, disclaimed his Earldom of Home to serve as prime minister of the United Kingdom (1963–1964). Upon his death in 1995, the title passed to his son, David Douglas-Home, 15th Earl of Home.

His brother, William Douglas-Home, was a distinguished author and playwright.

== Chief ==
The current chief is The Right Honourable Michael Douglas-Home, 16th Earl of Home.

== Castles and houses ==
- Hume Castle was the original seat of the chief of Clan Home, the Earl of Home.
- The Hirsel is the current seat of the Earls of Home.
- Marchmont House, Berwickshire
- Fast Castle, Berwickshire
- Wedderburn Castle, Berwickshire, is the seat of the senior cadet branch, Home of Wedderburn
- Paxton House, Berwickshire
- Hutton Castle, Berwickshire
- Ayton Castle, Berwickshire
- Moray House, Edinburgh, was built by the Countess of Home in the 1620s.
- Dunglass Castle, East Lothian
- Manderston, Berwickshire
- Blackadder Castle, Berwickshire
- Kimmerghame House, Berwickshire
- Redbraes Castle, Berwickshire
- Bassendean House, Berwickshire
- Thornton Castle, East Lothian

== Military association ==
The 40th Regiment Royal Artillery (40 Regt RA), known as The Lowland Gunners, maintained a longstanding association with Clan Home, incorporating the Home tartan into its dress until entering inactive status during the 2010 Strategic Defence and Security Review (SDSR). All personnel wore Home tartan rank slides, while officers donned tartan trews with dinner jackets—unofficially termed "Lowland Order"—and the regimental pipes and drums wore tartan kilts, trews, and accoutrements. In 2009, after relocating from Topcliffe, North Yorkshire, to Thiepval Barracks, Lisburn, Northern Ireland, as part of an Army-wide rebasing plan, the regiment named its technical accommodation "Home Lines", opened by General Sir Timothy Granville-Chapman in 2010 with Clan Home representatives present. The commanding officer’s residence, "Home House", later caused confusion among those unfamiliar with the clan's pronunciation and its regimental connection. Following the disbandment of 40 Regt RA in 2012, some traditions were adopted by the 19th Regiment Royal Artillery.

== See also ==
- Home baronets
- Hume baronets
