= Ladykirk, Scottish Borders =

Village in Scottish Borders, Scotland

Coordinates: 55°43′N 2°11′W

Ladykirk is a village on the B6470 in the Scottish Borders area of Scotland, and the former Berwickshire, just north of the River Tweed and the Anglo-Scottish border. The town was formerly known as Upsettlington, but King James IV of Scotland renamed the town Ladykirk; the church is also known as St Mary's Church or Kirk of Steill. Ladykirk stands directly opposite Norham Castle, Northumberland, England

== In history ==
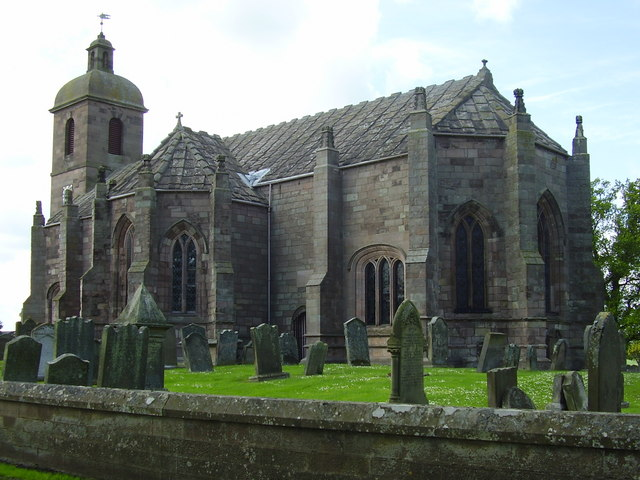
Ladykirk Church, the Kirk of Steill, was built by James IV of Scotland

=== John Balliol ===
The land opposite Norham Castle known as Upsettlington Green and Holywell Haugh was used for meetings during the wars of Scottish Independence. Robert de Brus, 6th Lord of Annandale, the father of Robert the Bruce, and the Competitors for the Crown of Scotland convened at Holywell Haugh on 2 June 1291, and met Robert Burnell the English Bishop of Bath and Wells. On the following day John Balliol acknowledged Edward I of England as his feudal superior.

=== James IV ===
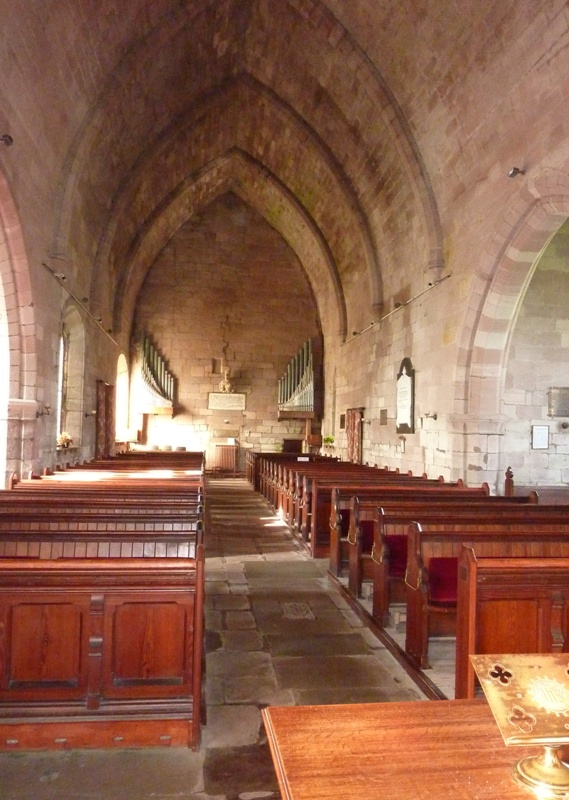
Nave of Ladykirk Church

James IV established his headquarters at Upsettlington on 5 August 1497 during an attack on Norham Castle. Here James played cards with the Spanish ambassador Pedro de Ayala. The approach of an English army led by the Earl of Surrey forced James to abandon the siege of Norham. Surrey marched towards Ayton Castle and by 21 August 1497 peace was negotiated and James sent orders to stop re-inforcements coming to Ayton.

Soon after, James IV built a new church called Our Lady Kirk of Steill at Upsettlington. Originally, the church served two parishes, Horndene and Upsettlington. It is said that James founded the new church in gratitude for his safe crossing of the River Tweed, or to commemorate the siege of Norham Castle in 1497 and its peaceful conclusion. An inscription already illegible by the late 18th-century recorded that the church was founded by James in 1500, marking the Christian jubilee year.

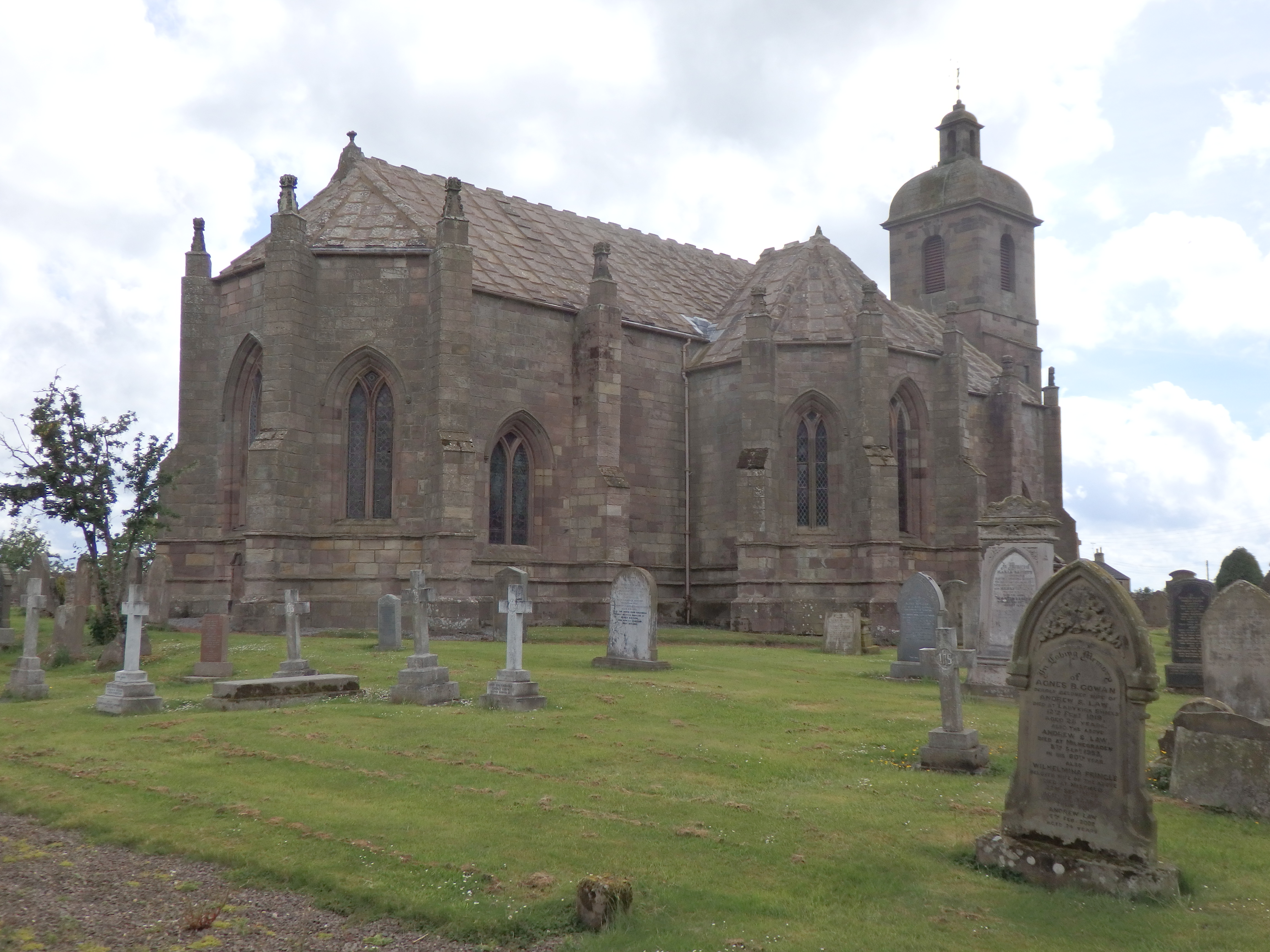
Ladykirk church from the churchyard

The construction was first supervised by Sir Patrick Blacader from 1500 when he was allocated £40 from wool customs for the construction. Blacader's chaplain William Wilkinson managed the accounts, and was given money by Walter Ogilvy. From 1504 onwards the works were directed by George Ker of Samuelston. In May 1504 the glazier Thomas Peblis visited to measure the windows for glass.

James IV visited in August 1501, and a church organ was brought for this occasion. Payments for the Kirk were listed in the royal accounts under the same 'buildings' heading as for the king's palaces and the ships of the Royal Scots Navy. A chasuble embroidered with the royal arms, with an alb, and an altar frontal of arras-work were provided in March 1505, and the building work continued. In legend, the foundation of the church became associated with visits of James IV to Lady Heron of Ford, and the defeat of the Scottish army at Flodden. Subsequently, the church was an important meeting place on the border.

James gave the lands of Upsettlington and Holywell, with fishing rights, and the patronage of the new church to Alexander Lord Home. Lord Home had been the patron of the previous church. In the 16th-century fishing rights at Holywell were disputed between Lord Home and the English Norham castle.

=== Later sixteenth century ===
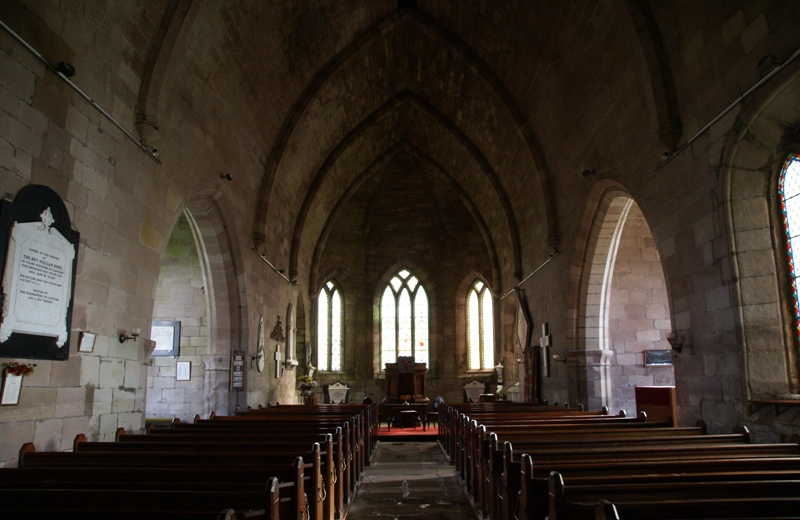
East end of the church

The Earl of Angus and his allies Lord Home, Lord Livingstone and John (Red-Bag) Somerville of Cambusnethan met at the Kirk of Steill in 1521. They were leaving Scotland to avoid Regent Albany their political rival who had returned from France. Angus sent his uncle, the poet Gavin Douglas to Cardinal Wolsey from Ladykirk on 13 December 1521.

The gentlemen of Selkirk, Jedburgh and Duns were summoned to meet Mary of Guise at Ladykirk on 24 November 1551, as she returned from France.

The 15th century church and village are known as the place where a treaty supplemental to the Peace of Cateau-Cambrésis was signed by the English and Scottish commissioners. The Treaty of Upsettlington, May 1559, (as it is known) was concluded within the Lady Kirk and exchanged at the church of Norham in England. The commissioners of Mary, Queen of Scots and Francis II of France were the Earl of Morton, Alexander, Lord Hume, Henry Sinclair, Dean of Glasgow and James MacGill of Nether Rankeillour. The English commission included the Earl of Northumberland and the Bishop of Durham.

Another meeting was held in the church on 22 September 1559 to discuss the management of border disputes. The English delegates were Ralph Sadler and James Croft, and the Scottish delegates were James Hepburn, 4th Earl of Bothwell, Richard Maitland and Walter Ker of Cessford.

== Notable people ==
- Rev Prof John Dobie (1859–1892) son of Rev William Dobie, minister of Ladykirk

== See also ==
- Ladykirk and Norham Bridge
- List of places in the Scottish Borders
- List of places in Scotland
- List of places in Northumberland
- List of places in England

== Sources ==
- Brooke, C J (2000) Safe sanctuaries: security and defence in Anglo-Scottish border churches 1290–1690, Edinburgh; Pages 10, 18–21, 31, 63, 126, 219, 306, 360–1, 365. Held at RCAHMS F.5.31.BRO
