= Thornton Castle =

Coordinates: 55.954434°N 2.425256°W

Thornton Castle was a Scottish fortress belonging to the Montgomery family and subsequently Lord Home near Innerwick in East Lothian.

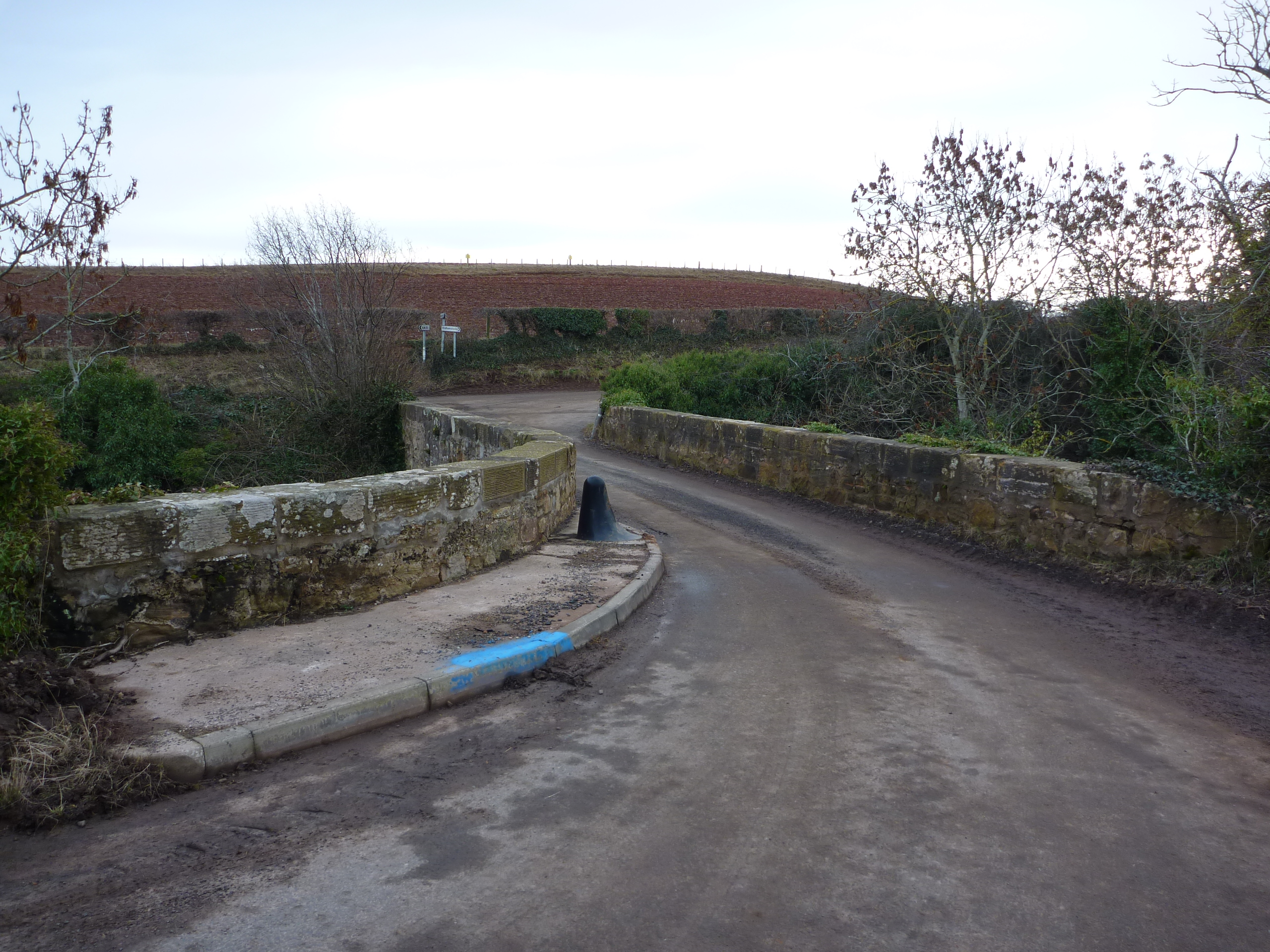
Thornton Bridge at Innerwick crosses the Thornton burn above the site of Thornton Castle

Thornton Castle was on the opposite side of Thornton Glen to Innerwick Castle, which is a mile east of Innerwick village. It was blown up in September 1547.

== Montgomery and Home ==
After the death of Hugh Montgomery of Thornton in 1477, his son and heir John Montgomery gave the lands of Nether and Over Thornton to his wife Alison Hamilton, a daughter of Archibald Hamilton of Innerwick. John Montgomery quarrelled with his father's widow Isobel Houston over farmland at Thornton and withheld her household goods including a "great dozen" of pewter vessels. He was asked to return cattle which he had stolen from the sons of Lord Home at Stenton in 1482. After Montgomery stole from the lands of Hoprig at Cockburnspath in 1482, James III gave restitution to William Baillie by "comprising" Montgomery's lands.

Alison Hamilton was confirmed as owner of the lands of Thornton in May 1502 by James IV, although the transfer of the lands by John Montgomery in 1477 was declared invalid. Alexander Home, 2nd Lord Home was given some of the lands of Thornton in 1500 and 1502, as acknowledged in Alison Hamilton's confirmation. James IV made a further grant of the lands of Thornton to Alexander Home, 3rd Lord Home on 28 April 1507. This grant was made by James IV on behalf of his infant son, Prince James, who was Steward of Scotland and feudal overlord of Thornton.

== Rough Wooing ==
Thornton Castle and Innerwick Castle were captured and destroyed by the English army before the battle of Pinkie in September 1547, during the war known as the Rough Wooing. Thornton was held by Tom Trotter for George Home, 4th Lord Home.

The English commander, the Duke of Somerset sent the Somerset Herald to Trotter to demand surrender. Trotter said he would speak with the duke, but rode away, leaving a small garrison to defend the house. Four cannons bombarded Thornton Castle while foot soldiers with muskets directed by Peter Meutas prevented the defenders shooting from the gunloops. Eventually the garrison surrendered to Miles Partridge and the castle was demolished with gunpowder.

No visible structures remain of the castle today.

Thornton in East Lothian is sometimes confused with Thorntoun in East Ayrshire.
