= Mariotta Haliburton =

16th-century Scottish noblewoman

Mariotta or Maryon or Marion Haliburton, Lady Home (c.1500 – c.1563) was a 16th-century Scottish noblewoman. She varied the spelling of her forename between Mariotta, Marion, and Mary. She is remembered for her defence and negotiation of the surrender of Hume Castle after the Battle of Pinkie when the castle was surrounded by an English army. Afterwards she continued to struggle for the rights of her people at the village of Hume in the Scottish Borders, writing both to the English commander and the Scottish leader.

== Family ==
Mariotta was the daughter of Patrick Haliburton of Dirleton Castle and Christine Wawane. She and her sisters Janet and Margaret were Patrick's heirs when he died in 1515. She married George, Lord Home before 7 April 1529. Their children included;

- Alexander Home, 5th Lord Home.
- Andrew Home, Commendator of Jedburgh and Restenneth.
- John Home of Coldenknowes (Cowdenknowes).
- Margaret Home, who married Alexander Erskine of Gogar, mother of Thomas Erskine, 1st Earl of Kellie.
- two other daughters.

Mariotta's eldest sister, Janet, married William Ruthven, 2nd Lord Ruthven. Margaret married George Ker of Faldonside. On 22 June 1535, James V of Scotland confirmed Mariotta and George's ownership of lands forfeited by Alexander Home, 3rd Lord Home in return for their good service against the English enemy.

== At war ==
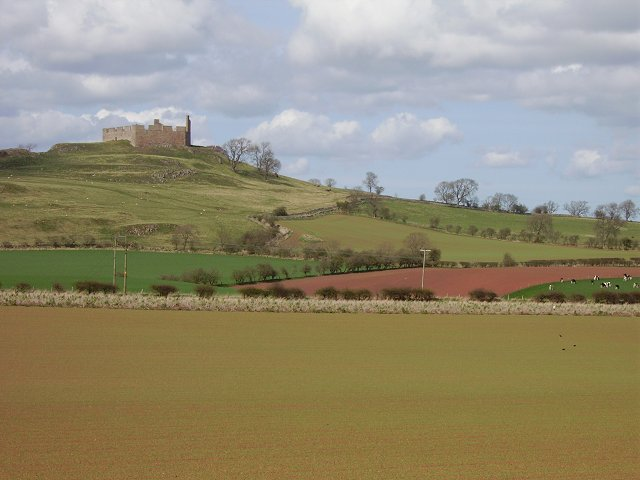
Hume Castle where Mariotta faced the English army.

As the war of the Rough Wooing escalated, Regent Arran sent soldiers and guns to help defend their Castle at Hume. The English defeated the Scottish army at Pinkie near Musselburgh on Saturday 10 September 1547. Alexander Home was taken prisoner, and George was injured, and while he lay sick in Edinburgh, the English army arrived at Hume on 20 September. Mariotta herself negotiated the surrender of Hume Castle with the Earl of Somerset. Her instructions were brought to the castle by Somerset Herald and her sons Andrew and John agreed to surrender. The 78 Scottish soldiers within were allowed to leave, and Andrew handed the keys to the new English captain, Sir Edward Dudley.

George and her eldest son, Alexander, were taken to England and the Tower of London. Mariotta continued to write to the Earl of Somerset seeking a better deal for her own family and the border people. She complained that people in Scotland said she had given up Hume Castle for money, and marvelled that they thought she could the keep the sober barmkin of Hume against the whole English army, while the whole Scottish nobility could not keep the field. Mariotta told the Earl that she dared not show her husband his letter and the pledges her people had made to England, and asked him to make new agreements that risked only their possessions, not their loyalty to Scotland.

Eventually Alexander was allowed back to Scotland, and soon on Boxing Day 1548, Hume Castle was taken from the English by a night raid. Edward Dudley was kept prisoner at Spynie Palace. On 28 December Mariotta sent the news from Edinburgh to Mary of Guise, who had left Holyroodhouse for New Year at Stirling Castle. She wrote that her son Andrew Home had taken part in the successful assault, with John Home of Coldenknowes and John Haitlie of Mellerstain. She claimed that if more men had joined her son they could have expelled the English from Kelso.

By March 1549, Mariotta was back at Hume Castle. Now she wrote to Mary of Guise that the troops were disturbing the villagers because they would not pay for their groceries; Mariotta insisted Guise pay the soldiers so they would not trouble the poor folk of Hume. In another letter she advised Guise to maintain discipline amongst the soldiers at this crucial time for the Auld Alliance;

"Your grace maun be very scherp batht on the Franch men and on the Scottis men, or it will nocht be weill; yet ader (either) to do as aferis to tham or lat it be, they mecht never getin sa gud ane tym. Pardon me that writtis sa hamly to your grace for in gud feth it cumis of gud hart as [any] that loifis bath the honour of Scotland and Frans."

In a letter to Guise written at Home Castle on 28 March 1549 she mentions a Spanish captain called the "Mour", "as sharp a man as rides". She hopes that Mary of Guise will be a "good Princess" to him and other captured Spanish soldiers. The man called the "Mour" is understood to be of African origin, and has been identified with a soldier named Pedro de Negro.

Mariotta's original letters to Somerset and Guise are kept in the National Library of Scotland and the Public Record Office at Kew. An English eyewitness, William Patten, described the bloodless siege after Pinkie and Mariotta's role. Patten cited a French proverb, that the siege was ended by a "talking castle, and a woman who listens". Jean de Beaugué, who later joined the French army at the Siege of Haddington, also gave an account of the siege, which praises Lady Home's resolve and emphasises the role her fears for her eldest son may have played in the negotiation.

== Legacy ==
Mariotta's grandson, Alexander Home, 1st Earl of Home married Mary (Dudley) Sutton a granddaughter of Edward Dudley the English captain of Hume. In 1617 this Anglo-Scottish marital union was celebrated by her kinsman and poet David Hume of Godscroft in the Muses Welcome to the High and Mighty Prince James. Godscroft pictured the marriage as an epitome of the union of the kingdoms of England and Scotland, writing that Mary Dudley's hand now restored the houses and castles formerly destroyed in border warfare.
