= Wedderburn Castle =

Castellated ashlar country house in Berwickshire, Scotland

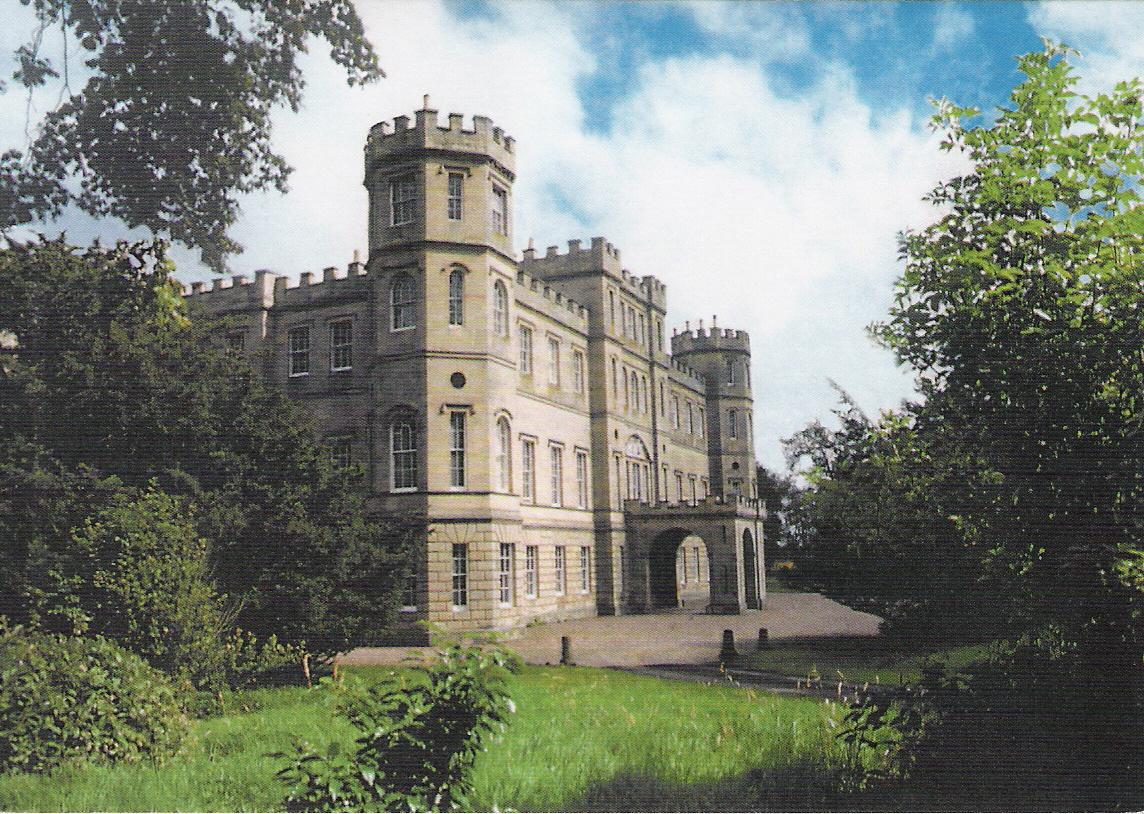

- Location within Scottish Borders
- Former names: Wedderburn House

General information
- Type: Country house
- Architectural style: Adam style, castellated
- Location: TD11 3LT, 2 miles (3.2 km) east of Duns, Berwickshire, Scotland
- Coordinates: 55°46′07″N 2°18′25″W
- Construction started: 1768–69, incorporating 15th-century tower house; James Nisbet, 1770–1775
- Completed: later alterations, including demolition of surviving parts of tower house (to NE) during early 19th century
- Owner: David Home Miller
- Governing body: Private

Technical details
- Material: Ashlar
- Floor count: 3

Design and construction
- Architects: Robert and James Adam

Website
- wedderburncastle.com

Inventory of Gardens and Designed Landscapes in Scotland
- Official name: Wedderburn
- Designated: 1 July 1987
- Reference no.: GDL00383

Wedderburn Castle, near Duns, Berwickshire, in the Scottish Borders, is an 18th-century country house designed by the architect brothers Robert Adam and James Adam that is now used as a wedding and events venue. The house is a Category A listed building and the grounds are included in the Inventory of Gardens and Designed Landscapes in Scotland.

== History ==
Wedderburn Castle is the historic seat of the Home of Wedderburn family, the senior cadet branch of the Home family (today the Earls of Home). It was designed and constructed between 1771 and 1775 by the architect brothers Robert Adam and James Adam under the supervision of the architect James Nisbet of Kelso, for Patrick Home of Billie, who had already completed Paxton House (using James Adam and Nisbet from 1758, with Robert Adam doing the interiors c. 1773). Construction began in 1768–69, incorporating a 15th-century tower house. With battlemented three-storey elevations in the typical Adam Castle style, the apparent symmetry of Wedderburn Castle conceals a rectangular courtyard, originally filled by the 17th-century (or earlier) tower house, also known as Wedderburn Castle, of which only a heraldic panel remains. Surviving parts of the tower house to the north-east were demolished in the early 19th century, leaving the courtyard accessed through an archway at the rear.

== The approach ==
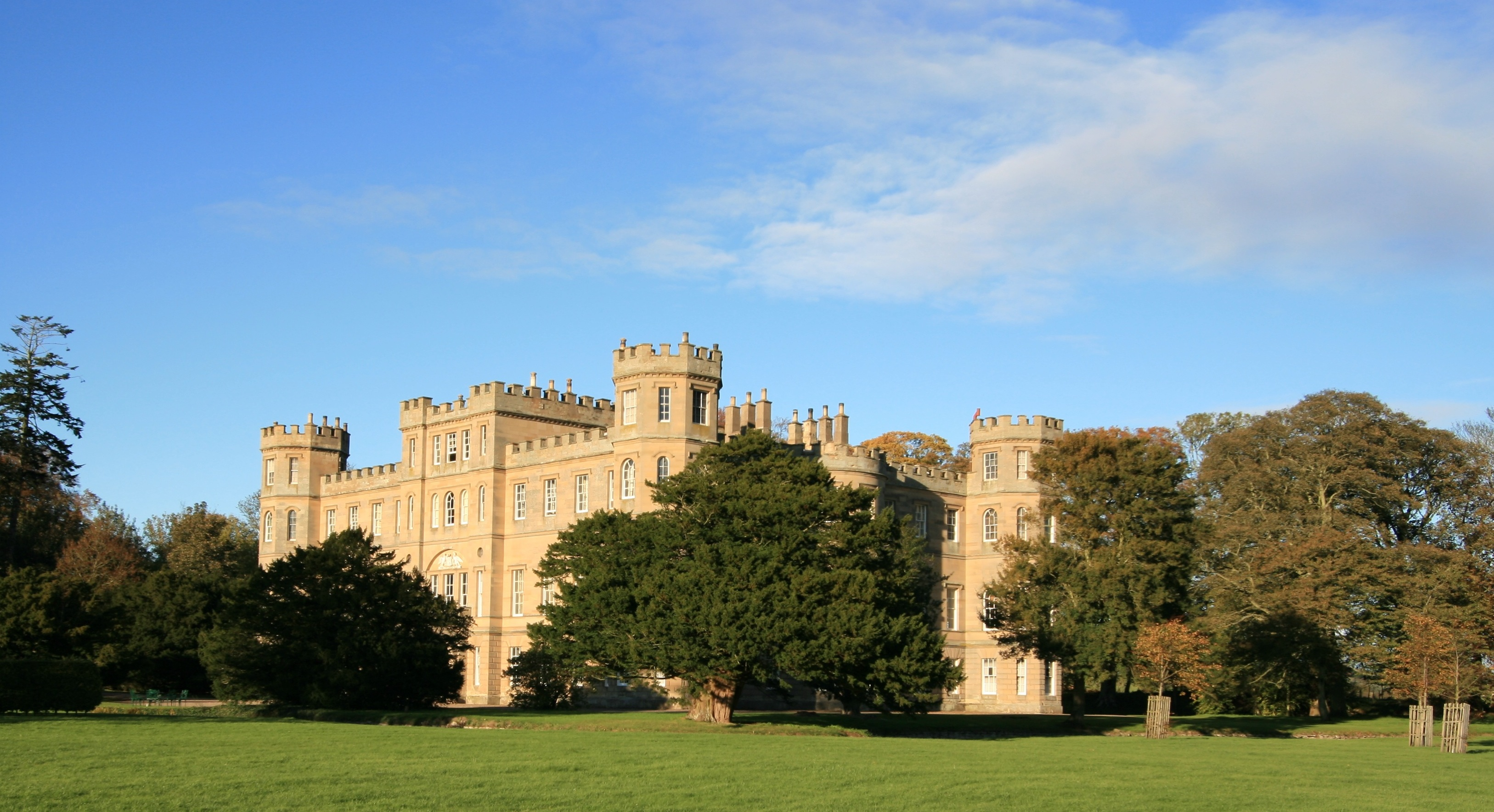
Wedderburn Castle from the South East

The castle is approached via the north, or Lion, Gate of 1794, designed by John Plaw, and a long drive leading from the West Gate. The drive passes the 18th-century stables, arranged around a square court entered through a pedimented archway, and the stables cottages before reaching the house. The former stables building is now used as an events venue.

The West Gate is another archway, defined by screen walls and gabled lodges.

== The castle interior ==
The principal entrance, beneath the Home of Wedderburn coat of arms, opens into a hall containing a double staircase with an iron balustrade leading to a balcony, behind which is a long gallery connecting the drawing room and the dining room. Across the hall and above the front door is a minstrel gallery, also connecting the drawing room and the dining room. To the right of the staircase are the drawing room and the morning room, formerly the smoking room, beyond which lies the ballroom. Several notable chimneypieces survive, including one in the drawing room of white Carrara marble and various other materials by Piranesi from 1774. To the left are the dining room and a further staircase leading to the bedrooms. The ground floor contains a large kitchen and further bedrooms.

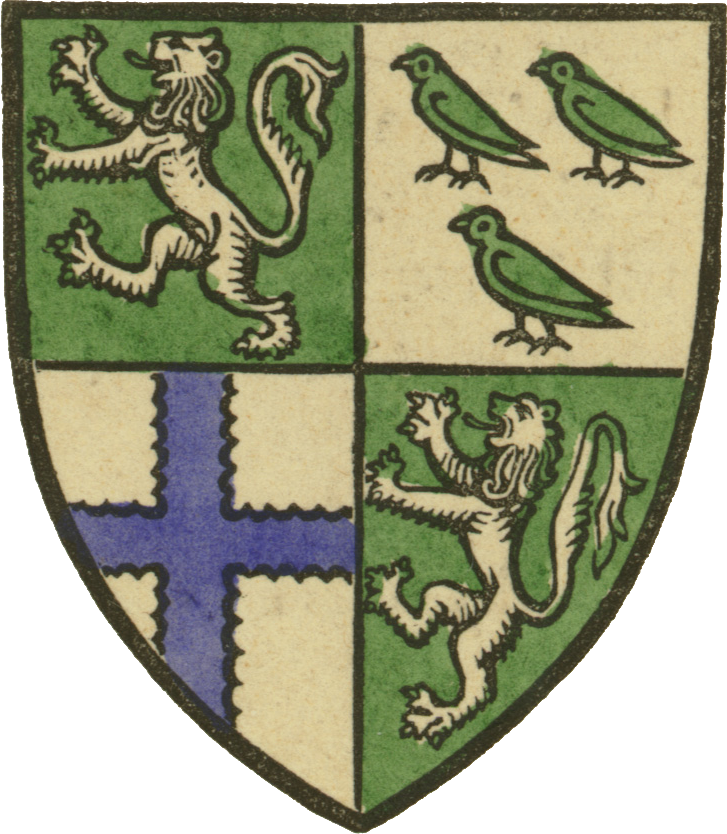
Coat of arms of George Home of Wedderburn and his heirs

== Ownership and the barony ==
Around 1413, the Earls of Douglas held the feudal superiority of the barony of Wedderburn, when Archibald Douglas, 4th Earl of Douglas granted it as a feu to his esquire, Sir David of Home. In a charter dated at Dunbar Castle on 29 February 1413, George of Dunbar, Earl of March, confirmed the previous charter granted by his brother, Archibald, Earl of Douglas, the superiority having passed by forfeiture from the Dunbar family to Douglas. By 1550, the Homes had acquired the superiority of Wedderburn, as indicated by a sasine in favour of David Home, brother-german (full brother) and heir of George Home of Wedderburn (killed at the Battle of Pinkie), stating that the heir and his brother held it of the Crown in chief.

Daughters of this lineage retained "Home", appending it to their married surnames, resulting in variations such as Forman Home, Milne Home, Home Robertson, and Home Miller. From 1898 to 1973, Wedderburn Castle was leased to the Arbuthnots. From 1973 to 2010, it was owned by Georgina Home Robertson. The current owners are David Home Miller and Catherine Macdonald-Home.

== See also ==
- List of places in the Scottish Borders
