= Fast Castle =

Medieval castle in Scottish Borders, Scotland

- Coldingham, Berwickshire, Scotland; GB grid reference NT860709
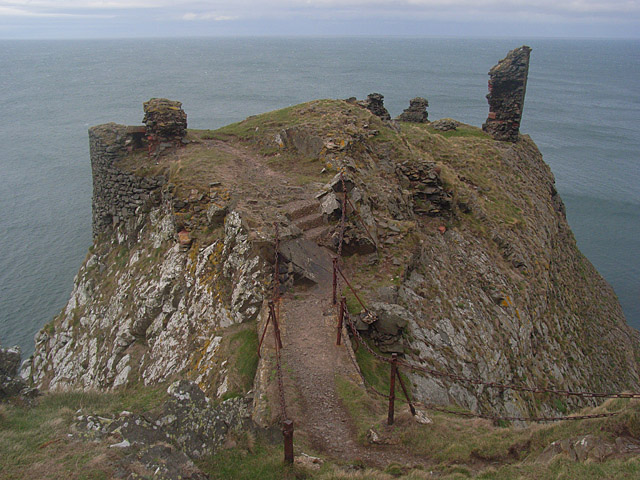
- The landward approach to Fast Castle. The wall stack on the right has since collapsed.

Site information
- Type: Courtyard castle
- Owner: Private
- Open to the public: Yes
- Condition: Ruin

Location
- Location within the Scottish Borders
- Coordinates: 55.9324°N 2.2239°W

Site history
- Built: Unknown, rebuilt 1522
- Built by: First phase: unknown Second phase: Earl of Dunbar; Third phase: George Home, 4th Lord Home
- Materials: First phase: unknown Second phase: Stone

Fast Castle is the ruined remains of a coastal fortress in Berwickshire, south-east Scotland, in the Scottish Borders. It lies 4 miles (6.4 km) north west of the village of Coldingham, and just outside the St Abb's Head National Nature Reserve, run by the National Trust for Scotland. The site is protected as a Scheduled Ancient Monument.

== The castle ==
Fast Castle, in its heyday, comprised a courtyard and keep, built on a narrow sloping plateau, 27 by 82 metres (89 by 269 ft), on an eponymous promontory overlooking the North Sea. Cliffs up to 45 metres (148 ft) high on either side rendered the castle relatively impregnable. The plateau was surrounded by a curtain wall with towers, with the keep at the northern extremity of the promontory. The castle could only be reached by a drawbridge over a narrow ravine, protected by a barbican. Little remains today of the keep or the courtyard walls except foundations, and a section of the north-east wall. The layout of the castle is very similar to that of Dunnottar Castle in Aberdeenshire, though Fast Castle is on a smaller scale. Access to the sea was via a pulley system with basket. There is a cave at the foot of the cliffs, which, it has been suggested, could once have acted as an access to the interior of the castle by its inhabitants.

== History ==
It is unclear when the first structure appeared on the site, but its defensible position must have made it attractive to even the earliest inhabitants of the area. There is evidence of Iron Age habitation here, and it was centrally positioned in the British kingdom of Bryneich, and its Anglo-Saxon successor state of Bernicia.

Fast Castle is first recorded in 1333. In 1346 the site was occupied by an English garrison and was used as a base to pillage the surrounding countryside. In 1410, a force led by Patrick Dunbar, second son of the 10th Earl of Dunbar and March seized the castle and imprisoned the governor, Thomas Holden. Its new Scots governor William Haliburton was also able to seize Wark Castle, Northumberland, in 1419.

The castle fell into the hands of the Home family (pronounced "Hume"), and in 1503 they hosted Margaret Tudor, daughter of Henry VII of England, at Fast Castle en route to her marriage to James IV. Following the Scots' defeat and the death of James IV at the battle of Flodden in 1513, in which numerous Homes were killed, a power struggle ensued between the Regent Albany and various other nobles including Alexander Home, 3rd Lord Home, Chamberlain of Scotland. Fast Castle was destroyed in the chaos in 1515, and Alexander Home was executed in 1516 and his land forfeit.

The castle was rebuilt by 1522, when the Home estates were restored to Alexander's brother George Home, 4th Lord Home. During the "Rough Wooing" of Scotland by Henry VIII, the castle was captured again by the English in 1547, but was back in Scottish hands by the time of Mary, Queen of Scots' stay here in 1566. The recapture of Fast Castle from the English is said to have been instigated by Madge Gordon, a Coldingham widow. Again back in the ownership of the Homes, the English ambassador Nicholas Throckmorton stayed at the castle with the 5th Lord Home on 11 July 1567, where he was "intretyed very well, according to the state of the place, which is fitter to lodge prisoners than folks at liberty, as yt is very little so yt is very stronge."

After the rebellion known as the Rising of the North, Anne Percy, Countess of Northumberland was lodged at Fast Castle in March 1570. Fast Castle was briefly held by an English force led by William Drury in April 1570, while the Earl of Sussex besieged Hume Castle acting against the rebels and their supporters in Scotland. Some of the guns of Fast Castle were taken to Berwick on Tweed. These cannon included two brass merlins and four falcons.

Ownership of the castle passed to Robert Logan of Restalrig through his mother, a widow of Lord Home. In April 1584 the keepers of Fast Castle, Innerwick, and Tantallon were commanded to surrender their castles to the crown.

Sir Robert Logan was a notorious dissolute and "ne'er do well" who was implicated in the Gowrie conspiracy to kidnap the young King James VI. In 1594, Logan contracted with the famed mathematician (and supposed wizard) John Napier to search Fast Castle for treasure. He was to "...do his utmost diligence to search and seek out, and by all craft and ingine to find out the same, and by the grace of God either find out the same, or make it sure that no such thing has been there." For this, he was to be awarded a third of any treasure found. There is no record of any discovery he may have made. Logan died in 1606, and his estates forfeited in 1609, his corpse having been exhumed and put on trial.

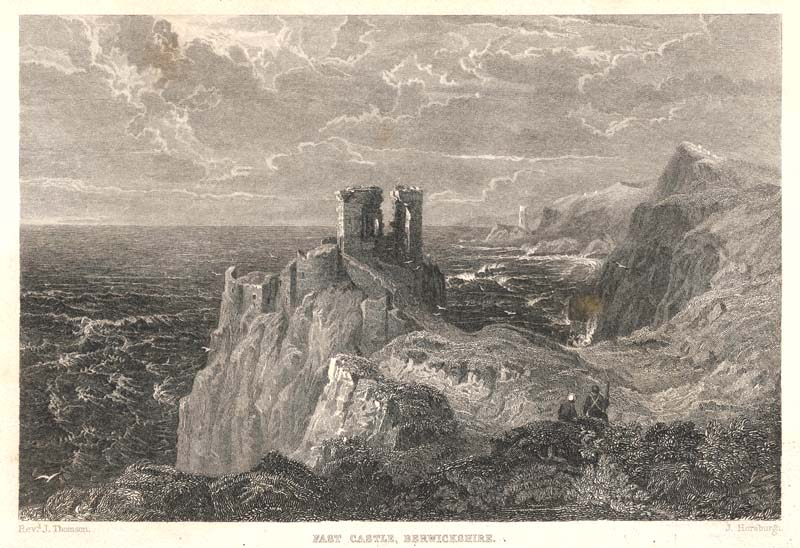
19th-century engraving of Fast Castle

The castle was by now ruinous. It passed briefly to the Douglas family, then back to the Earls of Dunbar, then the family of Arnot, back to the Homes and finally to the Hall family. The castle is accessible from nearby Dowlaw farm with a steep trail leading to it. A concrete footway now replaces the drawbridge. Between 1971 and 1986 excavations were carried out at Fast Castle by the Edinburgh Archaeological Field Society.

Fast Castle was originally known as Fause (lit. False) Castle, on account of the lights that were hung from it to mislead shipping. Shipmasters would see the lights while travelling in darkness, and consider that they had reached a safe haven, only to find that they had been guided on to rocks, where wrecking parties awaited for plunder.

== Literary links ==
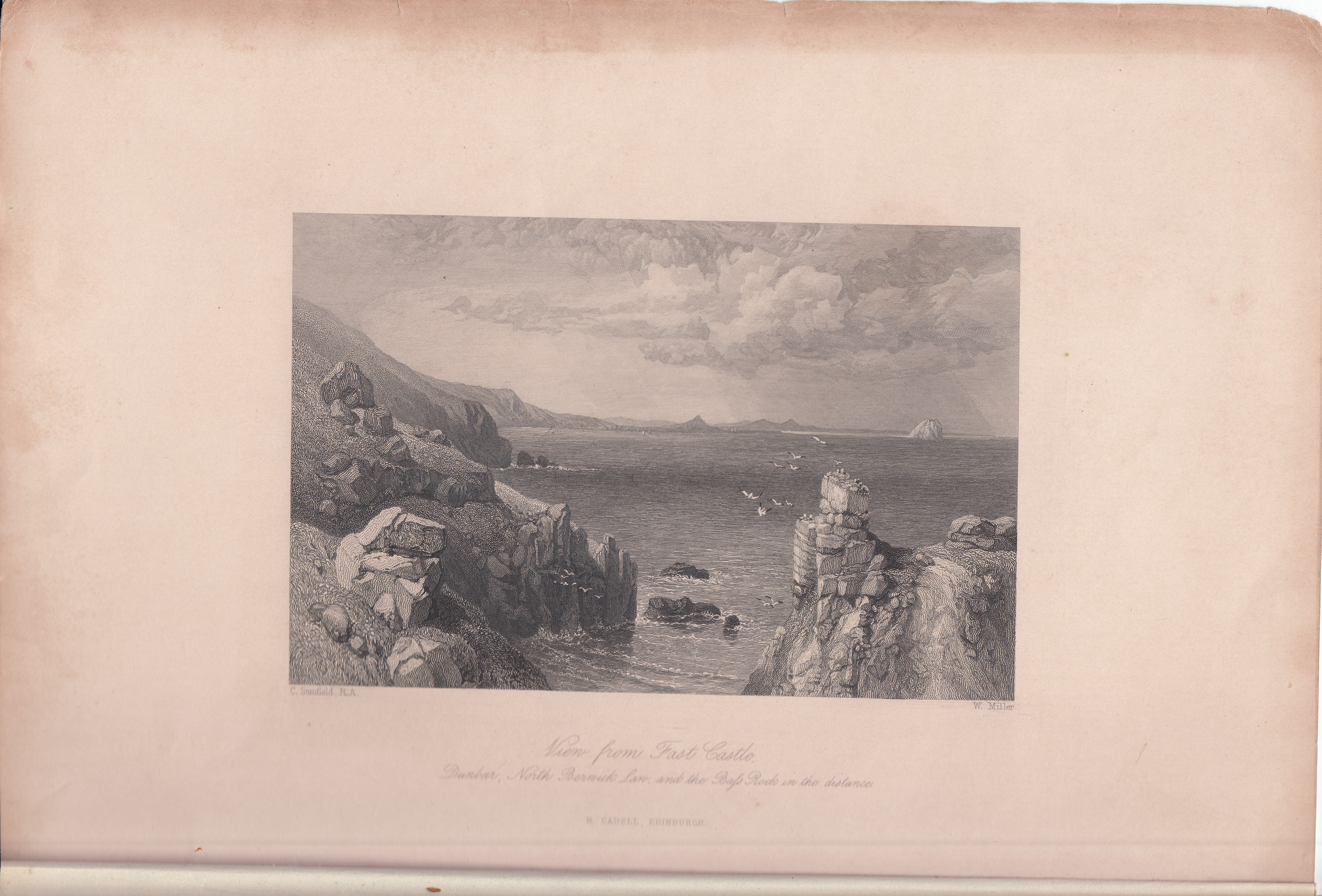
View of Fast Castle, from Waverley Novels vol iv (1844)

The castle is thought to have inspired Sir Walter Scott's description of the fictional "Wolf's Crag", which features in his 1819 novel The Bride of Lammermoor. Fast Castle and Logan of Restalrig both appear in Nigel Tranter's trilogy of historical novels, The Master of Gray series. The castle also features heavily in Tranter's Mail Royal, a sequel to the former trilogy. It is the setting for Kathleen Fidler's 1970 children's story The Gold of Fast Castle.

== See also ==
- List of places in the Scottish Borders
