= Ralph Vane =

English military campaigner novelist and critic

Sir Ralph Vane (also Ralph Fane, died 26 February 1552) was a supporter of Edward Seymour, 1st Duke of Somerset. He was hanged on Tower Hill as a result of factional strife.

== Life ==
Ralph Vane or Fane was born at the manor of Badsell in Tudely, Kent in the reign of Henry VIII. He was a descendant of Sir John Fane who had received extensive estates in Kent as his reward for capturing John II king of France at the Battle of Poitiers in 1356. He was only son of Henry Fane or Vane of Hadlow, Kent, who was sheriff of Kent in 1508, and grandson of Henry Fane or Vane of Hildenborough, Tunbridge. He distinguished himself at the siege of Boulogne in 1544, when he was knighted.

Fane was nominated under Henry VIII's will to be steward (with Sir William Goring) of Lord Lincoln's lands. He took part in the Scottish campaign of 1547 under the Protector Somerset, and after the battle of Pinkie Cleugh at Musselburgh was created Knight banneret. Two others so honoured were Sir Francis Bryan and Sir Ralph Sadler, and Fane was one of the last three soldiers ever to be so knighted on the field of combat. As a supporter of the Protector he shared the favour of Edward VI, and received from him in 1550, a grant of the mansion and estates of Penshurst Place and manor of Lyghe, the forfeited property of Edward Stafford, 3rd Duke of Buckingham. He also received the Manor of Tonge, Kent.

In October 1551, when John Dudley, 1st Duke of Northumberland moved against Somerset and his supporters, Fane was one of those charged with conspiring to murder Northumberland. He was arrested in a stable in Lambeth and sent to the Tower of London. On 27 January 1552 he was put on trial on the treasonable charge of conspiring to kill various privy councillors. In spite of his appeals to his military services and his strong denial of guilt, he was sentenced to death. The king described him at the trial as "answering like a ruffian". A warrant was signed by Edward on 25 February, and Fane was hanged the next day on Tower Hill. On the scaffold Fane repeated his plea of innocence. Of three companions also executed on 26 February 1552, Sir Miles Partridge was hanged and the other two, Sir Thomas Arundell and Sir Michael Stanhope, beheaded.

Fane's forfeited manor of Penshurst was given the same year to Sir William Sidney, and all the goods and chattels found in Fane's house at Westminster to Sir John Gate, a follower of Northumberland.

== Wife a benefactor ==
John Strype states that Fane's widow, Elizabeth Brugge (daughter of Rouland Brugge, died 1540, and Margery Kelom), was a "liberal benefactor" to Protestants under Queen Mary and corresponded with Philpot and John Bradford. Her 12 Certaine Psalms of Godly Meditation (1550) contains 102 proverbs. It was published by Robert Crowley, who went into exile about 1552.

Lady Fane was described by John Foxe as a "a speciall Nourse and a great supporter [within] her power of the godly Saintes, which were imprisoned in Q[ueen] Marie's time." She died in Holborn, London, in 1568.

== Notes ==
Attribution

- This article incorporates text from a publication now in the public domain: Lee, Sidney (1889). "Fane, Ralph". In Stephen, Leslie (ed.). Dictionary of National Biography. Vol. 18. London: Smith, Elder & Co.
