= Miles Partridge =

English courtier and soldier

Sir Miles Partridge (died 26 February 1552) was an English courtier from a notable Gloucestershire family, and a soldier during the reigns of Henry VIII and Edward VI. He was arrested in 1551, before being convicted of felony and hanged, as part of the factional struggle that followed the fall of Protector Somerset.

== Life ==
=== Origins ===
Sir Miles Partridge of Almondsbury and Bristol was the son of Sir John William Partriche of Cirencester and his wife Lady Agnes Bennett a notable local family of Wishanger, Miserden [2] (National Archives ref: E 40/12505). It was noted that when Miles’s brother Hugh received a grant of arms from Gilbert Dethick in February 15449, Hugh was described as “born in the northern parts, gentleman… descended of a house undefamed.” [3] [Clive Cheesman, Norroy and Ulster King of Arms].

Evidence that Hugh and Miles were brothers in the property business together comes from their joint grants and conveyances of former monastic lands and other shared transactions.[6] The genealogist Sir Bernard Burke later stated that the family descended from Sir Roger Partryche, originally from Kendal in Westmorland before settling in Gloucester, and the family can be traced back to 1157 in Kendal until Sir John Partridge (b. 1375) moved south and became known as “of Leonard Stanley” in Gloucester. An addition to the family coat of arms was later prepared for Miles Partridge by Sir Christopher Barker, Garter King of Arms (d. 1549/50).[5] Yet despite his respected lineage, Miles does not appear in the 1623 heraldic visitation for Gloucestershire, and this is most likely due to the circumstances surrounding his tragic death.[4]

=== Courtier and soldier ===
Miles has been described as a courtier and a soldier, an urbane figure who mixed with well-read courtiers [1]. In the London subsidy of 1541, where his name is listed next to that of the historian John Leland, he was appraised at 20s on property valued at £40 in the half-parish of St Michael-le-Querne, in the ward of Farringdon Within. He was granted the lordship and manor of Almondsbury in Gloucestershire (formerly belonging to St Augustine's Abbey, Bristol), with a reservation of £8.10s rent, in fee, for £1,773 (April 1545).

With the grant of Almondsbury, Partridge received also certain lands and mills in Kingswood, South Gloucestershire, and also "the buildings and steeple commonly called Jhesus Steple in the parish of St Faith, London, with the site and precinct of the same... except the bells in the said steeple". This relates to a celebrated story. Partridge held the office of chief Master of the King’s games, pastimes, and sports, and gained notoriety as a gambler. It was commonly said that on one occasion, when gambling with the king, he staked £100 on a single throw of the dice against the bells of the Jesus Chapel in the churchyard of St. Paul's Cathedral and the tower on which they hung. Partridge won, and had the bells broken and the tower taken down. "The same had a great spire of timber, covered with lead, with the image of St Paul on the top."

Partridge retained Henry's favour, for at the Coronation of Edward VI he was confirmed as Groom Porter to the young king under a grant of reversion made by Henry, so displacing Edward's own preferred servant Edward Cornwallis. He accompanied Sir Edward Seymour, 1st Duke of Somerset in the expedition to Scotland in 1547. He accepted the surrender of Thornton Castle, fought at the battle of Pinkie on 10 September, and was knighted at Roxburgh on 28 September.

In 1547-48 (commencing 27 November 1547) he served as High Sheriff of Gloucestershire, the oldest secular office under the Crown. In 1548, he was granted extensive former monastic properties in and around Bristol, and with Sir John Butler he purchased other properties in Gloucestershire. In May 1549 he acquired the riverside mansion at Kew which John Machell had purchased in 1546 (befitting a Master of the Clothworkers' Company): Partridge's occupancy was equally short-lived. In June 1550 he was also occupying a large property in Paternoster Row (in the parish of St Faith under St Paul's), belonging to the estate of Sir Christopher Barker, Garter Principal King of Arms, the same who granted arms to Miles Partridge.

=== Condemnation and death ===
In September 1550 Edward Cornwallis was granted a reversion to succeed Partridge as Groom Porter. After his long service in the court of Henry VIII and Edward VI, Partridge became implicated in the plot against Edward Seymour’s successor as Regent, John Dudley, 1st Duke of Northumberland. On 7 October 1551 he was accused by Sir Thomas Palmer of having undertaken to raise London and seize the Great Seal of the Realm, with the help of the apprentices. It was reported that he had entered too deeply into the amusements of the Court.

His guilt is not clear: both Palmer and Northumberland subsequently confessed that the evidence was false. While gallantly protecting a duchess, he was arrested at her house on 16 October 1551 on charges of conspiring against Lord Dudley. He was imprisoned in the Tower of London and was afterwards moved, on grounds of ill-health, to the lieutenant's house on Tower Hill, where his wife was permitted to attend him. The charges brought against him, and against Sir Ralph Vane, Sir Thomas Arundel and Sir Michael Stanhope were for "the Felony of moving, stirring and procuring of diverse persons for the felonious taking imprisoning and killing of diverse of our Privy Council", to which all four knights pleaded Not Guilty.

A commission being appointed for his trial on 29 November, he was convicted of felony and was hanged on Tower Hill on Friday 26 February 1552. Others implicated were executed there the same day: Vane was also hanged, and Arundel and Stanhope were beheaded. Partridge was little pitied, wrote John Strype, both because of his association with the actions of Edward Seymour, and also because his destruction of the bells at the Jesus Chapel was thought to have served King Henry's renunciation of papal authority.

After his death, on 16 April 1552 the capital messuage, gardens, orchards, stable, dairy house and lands at Kew (within the parish of Mortlake), together with all his goods and chattels there, were granted to Sir Henry Gates, Gentleman of the Privy Chamber, in light of the attainder of Miles Partridge. In April 1553, by patent of the Court of Augmentations, his widow Joan received compensation of her dower from the Crown and was granted the lordship, manor and borough of Kenn, in Devon. Early in the reign of Queen Mary, in December 1553 his heirs were restored in blood by private act of Parliament, and by further grants Joan's dower was confirmed to her during 1554.

== Family ==
Miles Partridge had one documented brother, Hugh Partridge, who was granted arms at London in 1549 by Sir Gilbert Dethick. Miles and Hugh acted jointly in land acquisitions in Bristol, Gloucestershire and elsewhere during the period 1545-1551. One Hugh Partridge married Eleanor Burbage (as her second husband) soon after 1553: she remarried to Oliver St John of Lambeth (1510-1571) in July 1567.

The suggested relationship of Miles (and therefore Hugh) to William Partridge of Wishanger, as sons of Sir John Partridge of Cirencester and Dame Agnes (or Anne) Bennett, was a conjecture by Sir Bernard Burke for which no documentary verification was cited.

Miles Partridge married a wife named Jane (or Joan). Two daughters, Margery and Katherine, are named as his heirs when, following his attainder and execution, they obtained restitution in blood by act of Parliament in 1553.

One of these daughters married William Stokebrege, Grocer. In 1563 George Barton, rector of St Mary Abchurch, was imprisoned for committing adultery with her.

Daughters:

- Margery Partridge, living 1553.
- Katherine Partridge, living 1553.
- ? Anne Partridge, (reputedly) married (as his first wife) John Vavasor of Waltham Abbey, Essex, son of Marmaduke Vavasor of Acaster and Anna Saltmarsh.
