= John Cockburn (Scottish officer) =

Colonel John Cockburn was an officer in the Scottish Covenanter army in the late 1640s and early 1650s during the Wars of the Three Kingdoms. In this capacity he led Lowland soldiers against Montrose's Scottish Royalist forces during the First English Civil War (1642-1646), when the Covenanter parliament of Scotland was allied with the English Parliamentarians against King Charles I. Colonel Cockburn led the colourfully defiant but futile Scottish resistance at Hume Castle during the Third English Civil War (1649-1651), when a Parliamentary army led by Oliver Cromwell invaded Scotland after its Covenanter government had made an uneasy alliance with King Charles II.

== Family background and the choice of a military career ==
John Cockburn was born in about 1620, the third son of William Cockburn of Choicelee and Sybilla Sinclair. A military career would have been a common choice for a son who stood little chance of inheriting his father's property. Quite possibly Cockburn fought as a mercenary in the 30 Years War along with thousands of other Scotsmen. Many Scottish officers, such as Leven, David Leslie, James Hamilton, 1st Duke of Hamilton and William Baillie, gained military experience and a strong reputation in the army of Gustavus Adolphus of Sweden. Thus a body of experienced Scottish soldiers became available to the Parliament of Scotland during the Bishops' Wars (1639–40) and during the First English Civil War.

== Military service during the campaign against Montrose's Royalist army ==
The Scottish Parliament, dominated by the Covenanters, was a powerful ally of the English Parliament when armed conflict erupted in 1642 between it and the Royalist forces of King Charles I. It is unknown whether or not Cockburn served under Alexander Leslie at the Battle of Newburn during the Second Bishop's War in 1640. In 1644 John Cockburn was a lieutenant in the Fifeshire Regiment, which was present in the Scottish Covenanter army led by Alexander Leslie, 1st Earl of Leven, at the Battle of Marston Moor, the Siege of York, and the Siege of Newcastle. Cockburn was given several senior commands in William Baillie's Scottish Covenanter army in 1645, and so it seems likely that Cockburn was known to and well regarded by Baillie.

At the Battle at Inverlochy on 2 February 1645, Lieutenant-Colonel John Cockburn, of the Earl of Moray's Regiment, led a battalion of 200 Lowland militiamen that formed the left wing of the Covenanter army that was commanded nominally by Archibald Campbell, the 8th Earl of Argyll and the chief of Clan Campbell. These Lowland militiamen had been recalled recently from the Scottish campaign in northern England, where they were quite likely led by Cockburn within the infantry forces commanded by Baillie. Despite their recent military experience the Lowlanders, together with the rest of the Covenanter force, suffered a crushing defeat following an aggressive pre-dawn charge by the Scottish Royalists and their Irish allies. The fighting degenerated into massacre, fueled by the years of bitter conflict between Clan Donald with its allies (e.g., Clan Maclean), the sources of the Highland contingent in Montrose's army, against Argyll's Clan Campbell, which provided the Highland component of the Covenanter army. Along with a small number of Lowland officers, Cockburn retreated to the relative safety of nearby Inverlochy Castle; outside the walls the survivors of the Covenanter army were pursued ruthlessly and killed. The besieged officers surrendered soon afterwards to Montrose (a former Covenanter turned Royalist) when they were given quarter in exchange for their parole that they would not oppose him later.

Nevertheless, by 4 April Lieutenant-Colonel Cockburn commanded the defences of Dundee when the town was assaulted and nearly captured by elements of Montrose's Royalist army. The Royalists were forced back out of the town when Covenanter reinforcements from Baillie's army arrived late in the afternoon.

== Service as Governor of Stirling Castle and at the Siege of Newark ==
On 8 July 1645 Lieutenant Colonel Cockburn was governor of Stirling Castle when the Scottish royal regalia were exhibited there at the opening of a new session of the Scottish Parliament. Parliament had left Edinburgh to escape a major outbreak of plague in the capital. It was a critical time during the Scottish Civil War: three weeks after the Royalist disaster in England at the Battle of Naseby (14 June), six days after the Scottish Royalist victory at the Battle of Alford (2 July), and five weeks before the Battle of Kilsyth (15 August) when Montrose appeared to have carried Scotland for the king. The threat posed by Montrose's army was effectively ended by Lieutenant-General David Leslie's cavalry-based force at the Battle of Philiphaugh on 13 September.

On 17 January 1646, Cockburn commanded the College of Justice Horse Troop at the siege of Newark, within the Scottish Army of the Solemn League and Covenant led by David Leslie. On 5 May King Charles surrendered himself to the Scottish besieging army at Newark. By delivering himself to the Scots the king was likely trying to produce a split between the Scottish Covenanters and the English Parliamentarians. However, on 6 May the king was required by Leslie to order the surrender of the Royalist garrison at Newark. This was one of the final chapters of the First English Civil War.

== Marriage and first retirement ==
On 14 January 1647 Colonel Cockburn married his cousin Helen Cockburn, the eldest daughter and heiress to William Cockburn of Caldra. The lands of his father-in-law (a staunch Scottish Royalist) were made over to him in 1648, shortly after he retired as governor of Stirling Castle. It is unlikely that Colonel Cockburn was involved in the ill-fated Scottish Engager-instigated campaign in 1648 in support of the restoration of Charles I during the Second English Civil War (1648-1649). Cockburn's duties as governor would have kept him in Stirling, far from the fighting. He would thus have avoided the disastrous defeat at the Battle of Preston of the Scottish army led by James Hamilton.

On 15 March 1649, just six weeks after the execution of Charles I in London, the Scottish Parliament passed an act in favour of Colonel Cockburn, the former governor of Stirling Castle. The act approved the prompt payment of £10,305 to clear up a debt that had been recognized as being already owed to Colonel Cockburn by an earlier act on 20 July 1647. The act of 1649 confirms that Cockburn's paid service in the Scottish army began no later than 1 August 1644. It further confirms that he was governor of Stirling Castle from 1 April 1645 until 1 July 1647.

== The defence of Hume Castle at the time of Cromwell's invasion of Scotland ==
Colonel Cockburn returned to the service of Scotland during the Third English Civil War, when the Covenanter-controlled Parliament of Scotland entered into an alliance with Charles II under the terms of the Treaty of Breda, signed on 1 May 1650. Cromwell responded by leading a Parliamentary army in an invasion of Scotland. The Covenanter army, led by David Leslie, was soundly defeated at the Battle of Dunbar on 3 September 1650. Parliamentary forces were then dispatched around the country to reduce the strongholds that were holding out. In February 1651, Cockburn commanded the garrison of Hume Castle when it was besieged by a Parliamentary force led by Colonel George Fenwick. (Hume Castle was only 12.75 km southwest of Cockburn's seat at Caldra.) At the start of the siege, when called upon to surrender, Cockburn is reported to have replied "I know not Cromwell. And as to my castle, it stands upon a rock!". After the bombardment of the castle had begun, Cockburn is supposed to have sent a note containing the following verse in Scots:

I Willie Wastle
Stand Firm in my Castle
And a' the dogs in the Toun
Shanna gar me gang doun!

However, once the resumed bombardment had breached the castle walls and rendered the castle's defence hopeless, Cockburn surrendered the castle with quarter given for its surviving defenders. Having given his parole to the Parliamentarians, Cockburn would have missed the final disaster that met David Leslie's army at the Battle of Worcester on 3 September 1651.

== Death and the succession of his eldest son as laird of Caldra ==
Colonel John Cockburn is believed to have died in about 1680, his wife having died before him in March 1668. He was succeeded as laird of Caldra by his eldest surviving son William Cockburn.
