= Hume Castle =

Scottish castle (ruin)

- Hume, Berwickshire, Scotland
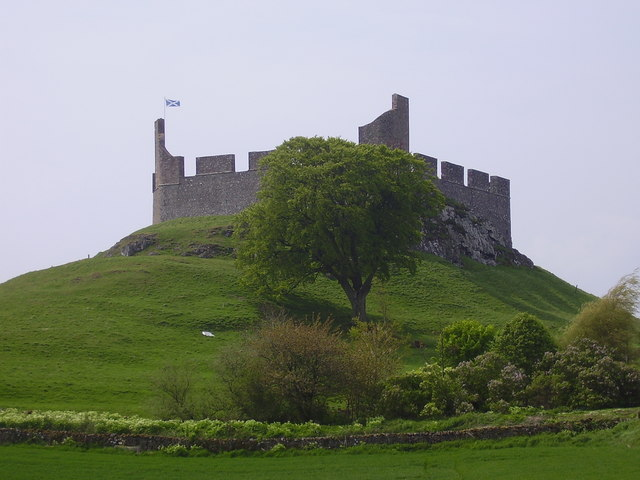

Site information
- Type: Castle of enceinte, recreated as a folly
- Owner: Clan Home Association / Historic Scotland
- Open to the public: Yes
- Condition: Ruined, rebuilt as folly

Location
- Shown within Scotland Scottish Borders
- Location within Scottish Borders
- Coordinates: 55°39′55″N 2°28′15″W

Site history
- Built: 12th/13th century
- Built by: William de Home
- Materials: Stone
- Demolished: 1651

Hume Castle is the heavily modified remnants of a late 12th- or early 13th-century castle of enceinte held by the powerful Hume or Home family, Wardens of the Eastern March who became successively the Lords Home and the Earls of Home. The village of Hume is located between Greenlaw and Kelso, two miles north of the village of Stichill, in Berwickshire, Scotland. (OS ref.- NT704413). It is a Scheduled Ancient Monument, recorded as such by Historic Environment Scotland.

It stands above its eponymous castleton, allowing a view across the Merse and to the English border at Carter Bar. It had historically been used as a beacon to warn of invasion. Its walls were created in the 18th century but remnants of the central keep and other features can still be seen.

== History ==
=== Origins ===
William de Home, son of Sir Patrick de Greenlaw (a younger son of Cospatric I, Earl of Dunbar), acquired the lands of Home in the early 13th century through marriage to his cousin Ada (the daughter of Patrick I, Earl of Dunbar). He then took his surname from his estate, a not uncommon practice of the time. It is assumed that he built the first stone fortifications at the site.

James II stayed at Home en route to the siege of Roxburgh Castle, the last English garrison left in Scotland following the Wars of Independence. (James was killed by the explosion of an early bombard during the siege.)

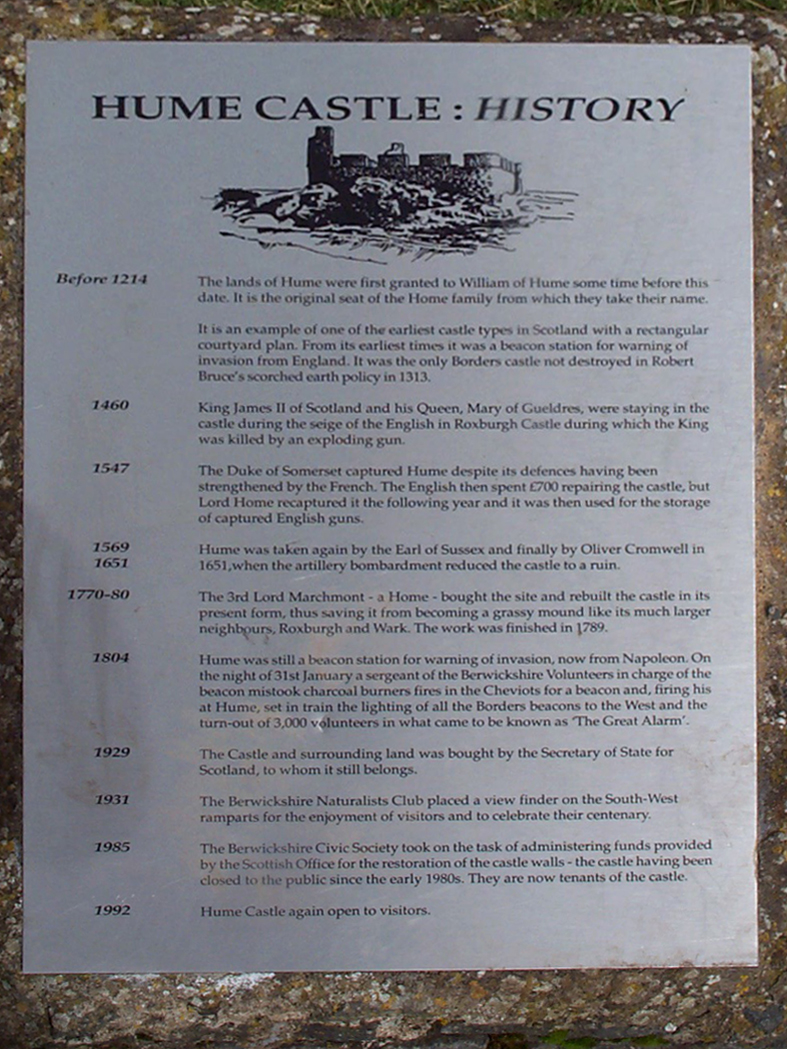
Plaque at the foot of Hume Castle hill

== Sixteenth century and the Rough Wooing ==
In August 1515 Regent Albany imprisoned members of the Hume family at Dunfermline, with Adam Tinmo, the Constable of Hume Castle. At this time, Scotland's Governor Regent Albany was planning to bring an army against the Hume family on the Scottish borders. Albany captured Hume Castle, but according to a report by Cardinal Wolsey's chaplain, William Frankelayn, Chancellor of Durham, Lord Hume, Lord Chamberlain, retook the castle on 26 August 1515, and kept Albany's captain, Lord Fleming's uncle, prisoner. Lord Hume then slighted his own castle, razed the walls, "and dammed the well for ever more."

Before the advent of artillery, Hume castle was considered almost impregnable. However it was captured in 1547 during the "Rough Wooing", by the Lord Protector Somerset. The Scottish ruler, Regent Arran, had sent 12 gunners to defend the castle in August 1547. George Home, 4th Lord Home, was injured at the Battle of Pinkie and his son Alexander captured. After stout resistance by Mariotta (or Marion) Haliburton, Lady Home, the castle fell and an English garrison was installed. According to an English account, the castle was rendered by the negotiation of Lady Home after the English army encamped nearby at the Hirsel or Hare Craig. Although English artillery was placed to commence bombardment, no shot was fired by either side. Somerset Herald conveyed Lady Home's instructions to the reluctant garrison who would have preferred Lord Home's word as a warrant for their surrender.

=== Baron Dudley holds the castle for England ===
Sir Edward Sutton, a cousin of the Earl of Warwick, was made Captain of Hume, and received the keys from Andrew Home, Commendator of Jedburgh and Restennet, on Thursday 22 September 1547. There were seventy-eight Scots within, and Edward Sutton found guns including; 2 batard culverins; a saker; 3 brass falconets; and eight other iron guns. More guns were brought to hold the castle, and an English inventory of December 1547 lists 21 cannons including 4 fowlers, and 40 hand-guns. Minor strengthening work was carried out by the English, on the advice of the military engineer William Ridgeway, but only £734 was spent, the local stone was unsuitable and limestone at Roxburgh too far away.

Mariotta, Lady Home, complained to the Duke of Somerset on 2 November 1547 that she had, "been very sore examined for the rendering of Hume", and accused of taking money. She thought it marvellous that anyone could think she could keep the "sober barmkin" of Hume against the English army, when all the nobles of Scotland could not keep the field. Hume Castle was nearly lost in February 1548, when Captain Pelham travelled to Warkworth Castle to collect pay for the Spanish mercenary garrison. The soldiers planned to rob him and change sides. Loyal members of the garrison fired the beacon and Sir John Ellerker's men arrested the would-be deserters. One was killed escaping, and Grey of Wilton planned to hang six of them, but the two leaders escaped into Scotland.

=== Lord Home recaptures the castle ===
After the death of his father, captive in the Tower of London, the young Alexander, 5th Lord Home, with the help of his brother Andrew the Commendator, recaptured the castle on 26 December 1548. The first man in was Tulloch, a servant of the laird of Buccleuch. Edward Sutton was blamed for losing the castle by negligence to a night assault. Jean de Beaugué, a French soldier gave an account of the re-capture. He said that an inside-man let in seven Scots, and at night an eighth man climbed in. These then overwhelmed the garrison. In Jean's account the man who climbed the wall was a Home, aged 60. Sutton was taken to Spynie Palace, and was still a prisoner at the end of the war, when the Earl of Shrewsbury was asked to organise his release by the exchange of French hostages.

Mariotta, Lady Home, sent the news to Mary of Guise on 28 December 1548 from Edinburgh. Regent Arran thanked John Hume of Cowdenknowes for his service recovering the castle. Henry II of France appointed Raymond de Rouer de Pavie de Beccarie, Baron de Fourquevaux as Governor of Hume. The English unsuccessfully attempted to recapture Hume in February 1549.

Lady Home was once again installed in the castle in March 1549 and complained to Mary of Guise in March 1549 of the behaviour of the French and Spanish garrison obtaining credit from the villagers. When the English abandoned their fort at Lauder the guns there were dragged by oxen to Hume Castle.

Mary of Guise ordered the people of Sherriffdom of Berwick and Lauderdale to provide 320 oxen to remove the guns from Hume in February 1558. The cannons were taken to the fort at Eyemouth. Agnes Gray, Lady Home, and Lord Home sheltered Anne Percy, Countess of Northumberland, an English refugee from the Rising of the North, at Hume and at Fast Castle in 1570. The castle was besieged in April 1570, during the Marian Civil War, by the Earl of Sussex during his raid into Scotland. The defenders capitulated within twelve hours, in awe of his superior numbers and the firepower of "three battery pieces and two sakers" brought from Wark Castle. Regent Morton gave money to Agnes Gray, Lady Home, in the 1570s to keep the castle garrisoned for James VI.

=== Downfall ===
The 17th century saw the demise of Hume Castle as a habitable fortress. The Earls of Home had already established another seat at Dunglass Castle and, by 1611, at The Hirsel. Hume Castle finally succumbed to the forces of Cromwell in 1651 during the Wars of the Three Kingdoms. James, 3rd Earl of Home was a prominent member of the Kirk Party. After Cromwell's successful investiture of Edinburgh Castle, he sent Colonel George Fenwick with two regiments to besiege the Earl's Castle. Catherine Morrison, Lady Wedderburn, paid £6 to bring cannon to defend Hume. The governor of the castle, Colonel John Cockburn, engaged in witty repartee with the Roundheads, but refused to deliver the castle. He claimed that he had no idea who Cromwell was and that the castle stood on a rock. He sent a note to Fenwick with the following doggerel:

"I, Will of the Wastle
Am King of my castle
All the dogs in the town
Shall gare gang me down!"

However once the bombardment began, it became clear that there was no option but submission. Fenwick's troops entered the castle, and accepted Cockburn's surrender. Cockburn and his men were given quarter for life only. They retreated and Fenwick slighted the fortification.

=== Resurrection ===
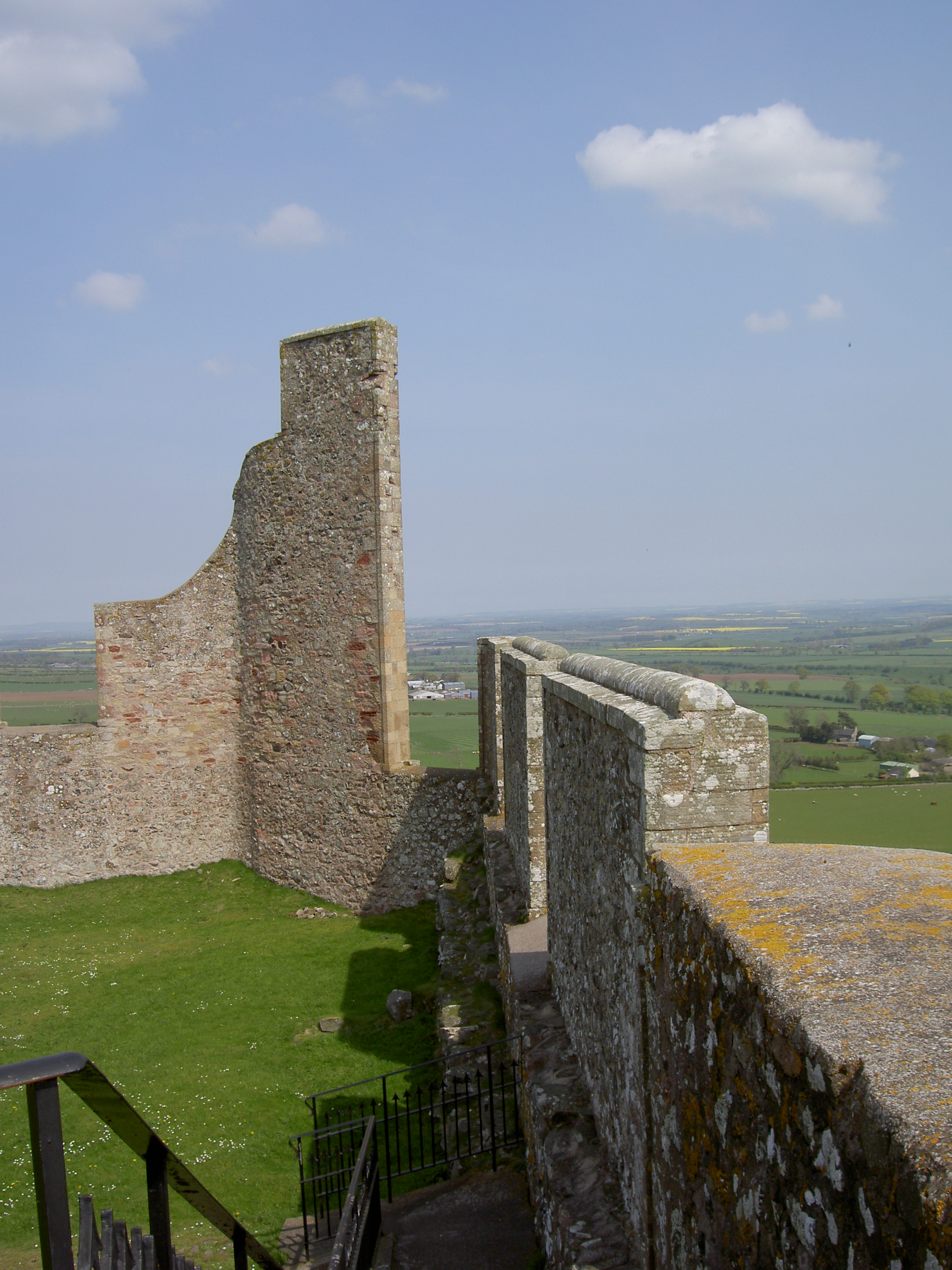
Crenellation at Hume

In the early 18th century, Hume and its environs came into the possession of the Earls of Marchmont, wealthier and more influential cadets of the main line of the family. The Castle at this point was level with the ground that it was built upon. At some point before his death in 1794, Hugh Hume-Campbell, 3rd Earl of Marchmont, 3rd Lord Polwarth, restored the castle as a folly, from the waste left from its destruction, on the original foundations of its curtain wall. He adorned the wall tops with enormous crenellations that are more picturesque than practical.

=== The Great Alarm ===
In light of its function as a mediæval early warning system, the castle was used again as a beacon during the Napoleonic Wars. In 1804, on the night of 31 January, a sergeant of the Berwickshire Volunteers in charge of the beacon mistook charcoal burners' fires on nearby Dirrington Great Law for a warning. Lighting the beacon at Hume Castle, he set in train the lighting of all the Borders beacons to the West, and 3,000 volunteers turned out in what became known as 'The Great Alarm'.

Again, during the Second World War it functioned as a lookout post, and was also to act as a base for resistance in the event of a German invasion.

=== Today ===
The castle is still seen as the spiritual home of the many Homes and Humes in Scotland and abroad. The castle was bought by the state in 1929, and in 1985 a restoration programme was undertaken by the Berwickshire Civic Society funded by the Scottish Office. It re-opened to the public in 1992. In 2006 the Civic Society handed over the castle to a charitable trust run by the Clan Home Association, under the auspices of Historic Scotland, to maintain its preservation in the future.

== See also ==
- List of places in the Scottish Borders
- Clan Home
- Hume (surname)

== Sources ==
- Ordnance Gazetteer-Scotland Vol IV, ed. F.H. Groome, Edinburgh, 1883
