= Sir Alexander Home of that Ilk, 1st Lord Home =

Sir Alexander Home of that Ilk, 1st Lord Home (c. 1403 – c. 1490) (Note: 18th and 19th century authorities (with the early exception of Crawfurd (1718)) presented as two separate people, father and son, the Sir Alexander who inherited in 1424 and the Sir Alexander who was made 1st Lord Home in 1473. So for example Douglas (1764), Almon (1767), Douglas and Wood (1813), the Dictionary of National Biography (1891), Fraser for the Historical Manuscripts Commission (1891), and Cockayne (1892). This was also followed by Balfour Paul in the fourth volume of The Scots Peerage (1907), and the 1914 edition of Burke's Peerage. However, perhaps in view of documentary evidence that Alexander, Master of Home was married as early as 1451, Balfour Paul reconsidered, writing in the 1914 volume of additions and corrections to The Scots Peerage that Recent investigation shows that previous writers on this pedigree... have been wrong in making the first Lord Home a separate personage from Sir Alexander. The mistake arose from the supposed necessity of finding a husband for Marion, heiress of Landells, and not perceiving that she was really identical with Marion Lauder. The editors of the second edition of Cockayne (1926) agreed, writing that Great confusion has been caused in earlier accounts by the fact that Alexander Home who married Marion Lauder has been regarded as the father of the 1st Lord Home, whereas, as is clearly shown in the Corrigienda to Scots Peerage, vol ix, pp 106-7 they were, in fact, one and the same person, as were Marion Lauder and Marion Landells. In particular, the change reflected that it was Marion Lauder who in 1425 had got sasine of the land of Swynset (NT724164) as one of the four daughters of her mother Katherine -- land which in 1391 had been granted to William of Laundels and his wife. Burke's Peerage also incorporated the revision, for example in its 1949 edition. However, Macdougall in the Oxford Dictionary of National Biography (2004) reverts to the version established by Douglas, with Marion Lauder/Mariota, heiress of Landells and Sir Alexander/the first Lord Home represented as distinct people.) was in 1448 Sheriff Deputy for Berwickshire, and was made a Lord of Parliament on 2 August 1473. He is an ancestor of the Earls of Home.

== Family ==
Alexander Home's father, Sir Alexander Home of that Ilk, & feudal baron of Dunglass, was killed at the battle of Verneuil on 17 August 1424, and Alexander Jr. was retoured his heir that year, indicating he was already of age. His mother was Jean, daughter of Sir William Hay of Locherworth, Midlothian. In April 1425 he made an agreement with his uncle David Home of Wedderburn, to halve the profits of the bailiary of Coldingham whichever of them should acquire it by purchase or otherwise, and is therein designed Alexander of Home of that Ilk.

== Envoy ==
Sir Alexander Home had a safe-conduct abroad with William Douglas, 8th Earl of Douglas on 9 November 1450, and was probably one of the "brilliant retinue" that accompanied the Earl to Rome for the Papal Jubilee. On 23 April 1451 he had another safe-conduct with the Earl. Sir Alexander was one of the envoys sent by King James II, on 27 July 1451, to treat with England, and with his fellow commissioners he signed a truce for three years on 14 August 1451, in the Church of St Nicholas, Newcastle-upon-Tyne.

== Marriage ==
Lord Home married twice: (1) Mariotta (or Marion), the daughter and co-heiress of John Lauder (d.v.p.1421),(son of Sir Robert de Lawedre of Edrington and The Bass (d. 1425)), by John's spouse Katherine, heiress to her father William de Landells and his wife Jonet. A Papal dispensation by Pope Martin V was issued on 11 April 1426 at St Peter's, Rome, for Alexander de Home and Marion Lauder (de Lawedre) to marry, notwithstanding that they are related doubly in the fourth degree of consanguinity. Subsequent to that Dispensation, Robert, Bishop of Caithness, issued 'Letters' declaring all their offspring legitimate, signed at Edinburgh on 1 April 1428, and witnessed by (the next) Sir Robert Lauder, knight, Lord of Edrington, amongst others.

They had at least seven children:

- Alexander, Master of Home (d. 1456, v.p.), married, following a Papal Dispensation, Agnes, daughter of Sir Adam Hepburn of Dunsyre, father of Patrick Hepburn, 1st Lord Hailes, with issue:
  - Alexander Home, 2nd Lord Home
  - John Home of Ersiltoun and Whitrigs
- John, Prior of Coldingham Priory (d. before 1505)
- Nicholas
- Sir Patrick, of Fast Castle, & Balwoolsy (d. after 1507), married Isobel née Forman, with issue.
- George, of Ayton (b. 1435 - alive February 1490)
- Elyne or Helen, (possibly the 1st child) (d. after 1480) who married Adam Hepburn, Master of Hailes (d. 1479). She married secondly Alexander Erskine, 3rd Lord Erskine.
- Jonet or Janet (d.after 1471), who married her cousin Sir Robert Lauder of The Bass (Papal Dispensation to marry dated 22 July 1442).

Before July 1467 Sir Alexander Home remarried (2) Margaret, daughter of Alexander, Master of Montgomerie by his spouse Elizabeth, daughter of Sir Adam Hepburn of Hailes. They had further children:

- Sir Thomas, of Langshaw, Ayrshire
- Nicholas (indicating that Nicholas by the first marriage had probably died young)
- Elizabeth
- David

His grandson Alexander, the future 2nd Lord, was a leader of the rebels who defeated King James III of Scotland at the Battle of Sauchieburn.

The 1st Lord Home lived to a very great age, dying, it is said, in 1490. He was succeeded by his grandson Alexander Home, 2nd Lord Home.

== Bibliography ==
- Historical Manuscripts Commission - MSS of the Duke of Atholl, and the Earl of Home, 12th report, London, 1891, p. 122.
- Historical Manuscripts Commission - MSS of Colonel Milne Home, p. 19.
- Balfour Paul, Sir James, Lord Lyon King of Arms, The Scots' Peerage, under Home, vol. 4, Edinburgh, 1905, p. 448-451. Sir Robert Douglas and Balfour Paul differ on the 1st Lord's death. Both are wrong.
- Townend, Peter, editor, Burke's Peerage, Baronetage, and Knightage, 105th edition, London, 1970, p. 1362.
- Davis, K. Rutherford, The Rutherfords in Britain, Alan Sutton Publishing, Gloucester, England,1987, p. 18-20, ISBN 0-86299-368-7

Peerage of Scotland
| New creation | Lord Home; 1473–1491 | Succeeded by Alexander Home |
