= Patrick Abercromby =

Scottish physician and antiquarian

- Born: 1656; Forfar, Scotland
- Died: c. 1716
- Occupations: Physician; historian; antiquarian
- Known for: Physician to King James VII of Scotland; as a Jacobite, he opposed the Union in various pamphlets
- Notable work: Martial Achievements of the Scots Nation

Patrick Abercromby (1656 – c. 1716) was a Scottish physician and antiquarian, noted for being physician to King James VII (II of England) and his fervent opposition to the Act of Union between Scotland and England.

== Early life ==
Patrick Abercromby was the third son of Alexander Abercromby of Fetterneir in Aberdeenshire, and brother of Francis Abercromby, who was created Lord Glasford by King James II. He was born at Forfar in 1656 apparently of a Roman Catholic family.

Intending to become a doctor of medicine he entered the University of St Andrews, where he took his degree of M.D. in 1685, but apparently he spent most of his youthful years abroad. It has been stated that he attended the university of Paris, France. A Discourse of Wit (1685), sometimes assigned to him, belongs to Dr David Abercromby.

== Return to Scotland ==
On his return to Scotland, Patrick Abercromby is found practising as a physician in Edinburgh, where, besides his professional duties, he gave himself with characteristic zeal to the study of antiquities. He was appointed physician to James II in 1685, but the revolution deprived him of the post. Living during the agitations for the union of England and Scotland, he took part as a Jacobite in the war of pamphlets inaugurated and sustained by prominent men on both sides of the Border, and he crossed swords with no less redoubtable a foe than Daniel Defoe in his Advantages of the Act of Security compared with those of the intended Union (Edinburgh, 1707), and A Vindication of the Same against Mr De Foe (ibid.).

== Continued work ==
A minor literary work of Abercromby's was a translation of Jean de Beaugué's Histoire de la guerre d'Écosse (1556) which appeared in 1707. But the work with which his name is permanently associated is his Martial Atchievements [sic] of the Scots Nation, issued in two large folios, vol. i. 1711, vol. ii. 1715. In the title-page and preface to vol. i. he disclaims the ambition of being an historian, but in vol. ii., in title-page and preface alike, he is no longer a simple biographer, but an historian. He was a laborious and accomplished reader and investigator of all available authorities, as well manuscript as printed; while the roll of names of those who aided him includes every man of note in Scotland at the time, from Sir Thomas Craig and Sir George Mackenzie to Alexander Nisbet and Thomas Ruddiman.

== Death ==
The date of Abercromby's death is uncertain. It has been variously assigned to 1715, 1716, 1720, and 1726, and it is usually added that he left a widow in great poverty. The Memoirs of the Abercrombys, commonly attributed to him, do not appear to have been published.

== Works ==
- Translation; Beaugué, Jean de, History of the Campaigns of 1548 and 1549, (1707)
