= John Dobie (linguist) =

Church of Scotland minister skilled in Hebrew

John Dobie (1859–1892) was a Church of Scotland minister skilled in Hebrew and closely associated with India. A polyglot he could speak English, French, German, Persian, Hebrew, Hindustani and Arabic. His career was cut short when he was killed in a railway accident.

== Life ==
Dobie was born in Musselburgh on 10 January 1859 the son of William Dobie, minister of Ladykirk. He studied at the University of Edinburgh graduating with an MA in 1878, then doing further studies in divinity graduating with a BD in 1882. He was licensed to preach as a Church of Scotland minister by the Presbytery of Chirnside.

His first role was as assistant at Park Church, Glasgow. He became Secretary to the Committee on Christian Life and Work. He then took a year off to do "oriental research" in Paris and Leipzig (this appears to have focussed upon India).

In 1888 he was appointed Church of Scotland Chaplain in Secunderabad in central India. He then obtained a post at the University of Bombay as Wilson Lecturer on Comparative Philology of the Semitic Languages. In December 1892 he returned to Scotland to take up the role of Professor of Hebrew and Semitic Languages at the University of Edinburgh in place of Rev Prof David Laird Adams.

During a trip to Arabia he joined a caravan of Arab pilgrims travelling to Yemen seeking to investigate Himyarite remains and increase his knowledge of Yemenite Jews. This backfired when he was arrested and had to be released through the intervention of the British government.

On 2 August 1894, Dobie was the only fatality in a train accident where a passenger train hit a freight train head-on near Newtonmore. Eight other passengers were injured in the incident. Dobie was aged 35.

== Memorials ==
A stained glass window was erected to his memory in Ladykirk church.

== Publications ==
His translation of the New Testament into Ethiopic remains with the University of Edinburgh.
