= The Hirsel =

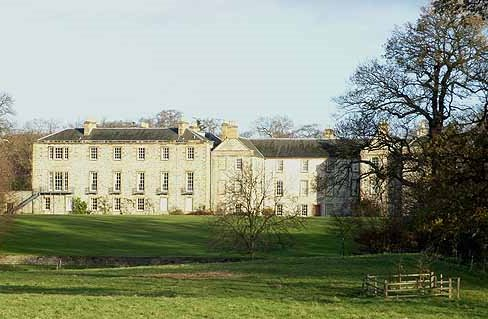
- West facade of The Hirsel

- Location in the Scottish Borders council area
- 55.6599°N 2.2726°W

History
- Built: c1600–c1850
- Built for: The Earls of Home

Site notes
- Owner: The 16th Earl of Home

Listed Building – Category A
- Designated: 9 June 1971
- Reference no.: LB4069

Inventory of Gardens and Designed Landscapes in Scotland
- Official name: The Hirsel
- Designated: 1 July 1987
- Reference no.: GDL00364

The Hirsel is a Category A Listed stately home near Coldstream, Berwickshire, in the Scottish Borders council area. It has been a seat of the Earls of Home since 1611, and the principal seat following the destruction of Hume Castle during the mid-17th century. It was the home of the British prime minister, Sir Alec Douglas-Home, who was the 14th Earl of Home from 1951 to 1963 and Baron Home of the Hirsel from 1974 to 1995.

== Architecture ==
A large mellow Georgian house of grey stone, most of which dates from the early 18th century, with an earlier portion dating from the early 17th century. Victorian alterations and additions were carried out by William Burn in 1851. David Bryce, George Henderson, and James Campbell Walker are also known to have worked here. Most of the Victorian additions were demolished during the mid 20th century. The interior contains a fine stone staircase in the centre portion.

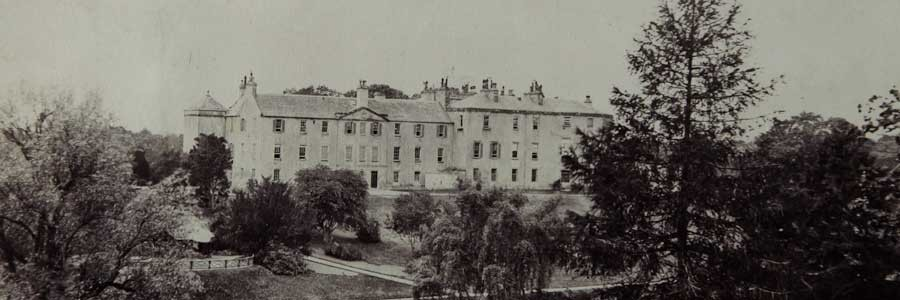
East front, mid 20th century, after the demolition of the chapel and north service wing

== Garden and park ==
The house is set within an outstanding English garden style late 18th to 19th century designed landscape which spans the valley of Leet Water. The landscape comprises informal parkland, woodland, and a large artificial lake (Hirsel Lake), and a late 19th century rhododendron and azalea woodland garden, Dundock Wood. The walled garden dates from the mid 18th century. In addition to forming an attractive setting for the category-A listed house, the grounds contain nationally important archaeological remains, a designated Site of Special Scientific Interest (SSSI) and two notable heritage trees.

== Visitor access ==
The Homestead Craft Centre and Museum of Country Life, the Tea Room and Craft Workshops are all located within the grounds. The 'Homestead Walk' and the 'Hirsel Walk' are open to the public 365 days of the year.
