= Alexander Home, 5th Lord Home =

Scottish nobleman

Alexander Home, 5th Lord Home (died 1575) was a Scottish nobleman and Warden of the Eastern March.

== Early life ==
Alexander Home was the son of George Home, 4th Lord Home and Mariotta Haliburton. He became Lord Home on the death of his father who was injured in a skirmish with the English two days before the Battle of Pinkie Cleugh.

== Marriages ==
In 1537 Alexander was contracted to marry a natural daughter of James V of Scotland and Elizabeth Beaton. However, he first married Margaret Ker of Cessford, a daughter of Sir Walter Ker of Cessford. Their daughter Margaret married George Keith, 5th Earl Marischal. He subsequently married Agnes Gray, daughter of Patrick, Lord Gray, and widow of Sir Robet Logan of Restalrig. Their son was Alexander Home, 6th Lord Home.

== Rough Wooing ==
Alexander was captured by the English while riding on Falside Bray on 9 September 1547 the day before the battle of Pinkie. Both William Patten and Jean de Beaugué related how his mother Mariotta Haliburton was then compelled to negotiate the surrender of Hume Castle to the English. Alexander was then taken hostage to England, but returned in 1548 and was quickly able to organise the recapture of Home Castle, with his brother Andrew Home.

In June 1562, Alexander sent a letter to Mary, Queen of Scots saying that Elizabeth I of England was preparing a large fleet to send to aid the Protestants in France. She showed this to the English diplomat at her court, Thomas Randolph who laughed at it. Randolph recorded her reply which hints both at Elizabeth's meanness and Home's motive;

"Well, you knowe that my lord Hume hathe a castle to keape - I wyll not be verie hastie to beleeve, nor I dowbt no suche daynger as he meanethe, and I trust that for the matters of France that there wilbe accordethe, so that your mestres shall not neade to be at anye suche charge."

== Civil war and imprisonment ==
At first Alexander supported Regent Moray against Mary, Queen of Scots at the battle of Langside and in the Scottish civil war. Moray gave him the Commendatorship of Arbroath.

In March 1569 Regent Moray went to Liddesdale to punish the border people. Moray was accompanied by Lord Home, Ker of Cessford, Ker of Ferniehirst, and Scot of Buccleuch and 4000 men. After holding unsatisfactory talks with the local leaders, "the best of the surname men", Moray burned the farmsteads in Liddesdale, and did not leave one house standing. He stayed at Mangerton, then had the house blown up with gunpowder and returned to Jedburgh.

In December 1571 Regent Mar blamed his wife Agnes Gray Lady Home, for his revolt and as a supporter of Elizabeth's rebels, now fugitives from the Rising of the North. Lord Home changed sides and joined the garrison loyal to Mary in Edinburgh Castle. He was imprisoned when the castle fell in May 1573 to an English force led by William Drury in May 1573.

Agnes Gray, Lady Home, had loaned the commander of the castle, William Kirkcaldy of Grange £600 Scots to help pay the garrison. As security Kirkcaldy gave her fifteen diamonds and a pearl necklace from the jewels of Mary, Queen of Scots. She had to surrender these jewels without payment to the Privy Council at Holyrood House on 4 July 1573. The necklace was described as "a carcan of gold and perll, the gold annamalit (enamelled) reid the string grene".

In June 1574 Agnes Gray wrote a long letter to Queen Elizabeth, who had written to Regent Morton in her husband's favour. She wanted to offer redress for previous actions that had offended Elizabeth, such as receiving her rebels including Leonard Dacre, whose father had been a friend to her husband's father. She hoped Elizabeth could tell her what to do to please Regent Morton. The English ambassador Henry Killigrew discussed removing cannon from Hume Castle, requiring a manifest from Lady Home or her husband, a condemned prisoner. There was controversy over whether some guns belonged to Hume, the crown of Scotland, or the Laird of Restalrig. Agnes gave him a memorandum of the cannon at Hume in September 1574.

Alexander Home died in 1575.

His widow Agnes Gray then married the Master of Glamis.

Peerage of Scotland
Preceded by George Home	Lord Home; 1549–1575	Succeeded by Alexander Home
