= Lord Warden of the Marches =

English military post

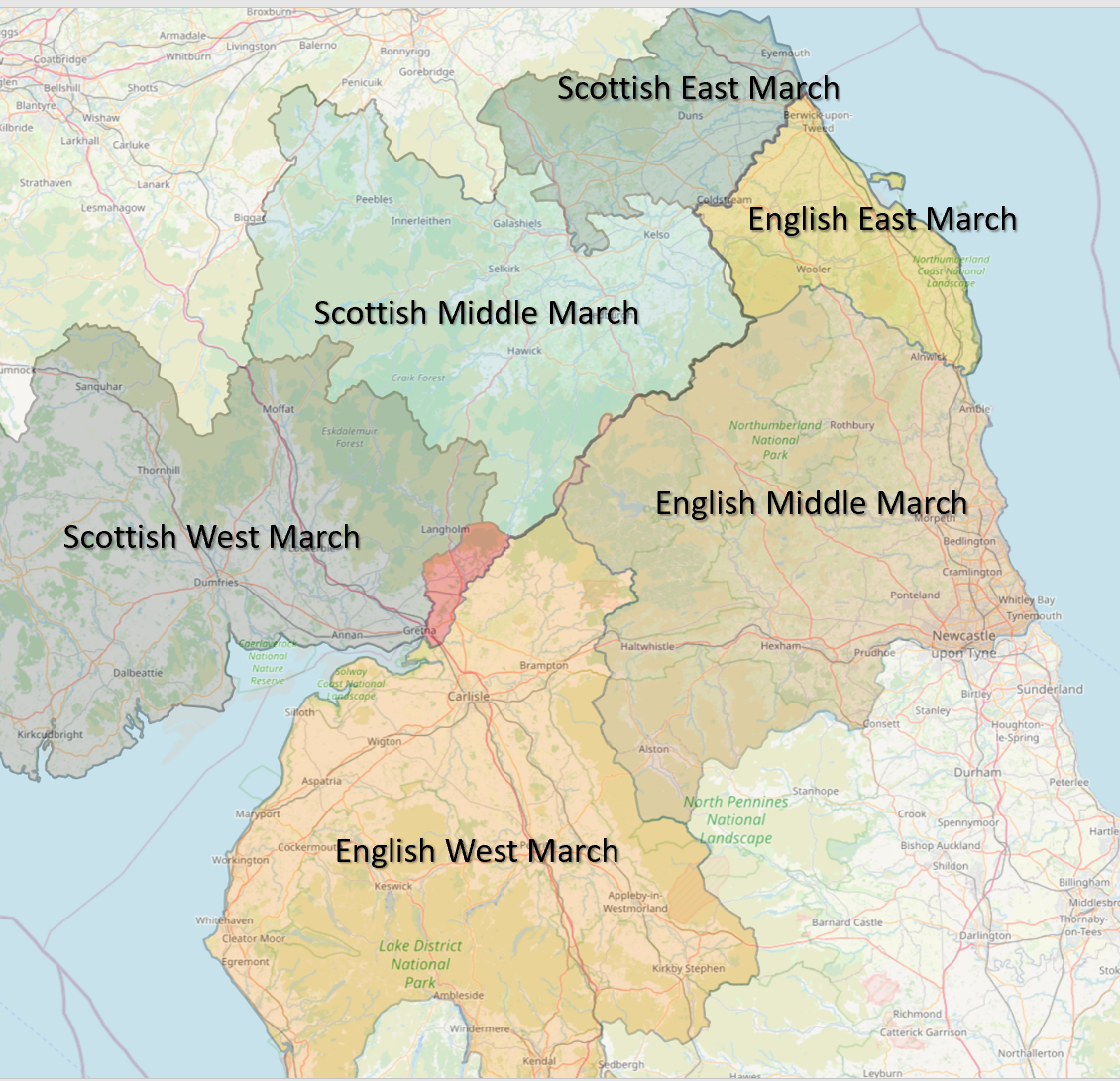
Map of the Scottish Marches

The Lord Warden of the Marches was an office in the governments of Scotland and England. The holders were responsible for the security of the border between the two nations, and often took part in military action. They were also responsible, along with Conservators of the Truce, for administering the special type of border law known as March law.

The Marches on both sides of the border were traditionally split into West, Middle, and East, each with their own warden answerable to the Lord Warden-general. The English Western March was based on Carlisle and the Eastern March on Berwick-upon-Tweed.

The offices became unnecessary after the union of the crowns of England and Scotland under King James in 1603.

== For England ==
=== Warden of the Marches ===
- Robert de Clifford (1297–) (died 1314)
- John de Warenne, 7th Earl of Surrey (1327–)
- Henry de Percy, 2nd Baron Percy (1328–)
- Ralph Neville, 2nd Baron Neville de Raby and Henry de Percy, 2nd Baron Percy (1334–) (jointly)
- Gilbert Welton and Thomas Lucy (1336–) (jointly)
- Henry de Percy, 3rd Baron Percy (1352–)
- Henry de Percy, 3rd Baron Percy (1356–) (died 1368)
- Henry Percy, 4th Baron Percy (1368–)
- Thomas Appleby, Roger de Clifford, 5th Baron de Clifford and others (1370–) (jointly)

=== Lord Warden of the Marches ===
- Roger de Clifford, 5th Baron de Clifford – the first holder of this office (1377–)
- Henry Percy, 3rd Earl of Northumberland (1439–)
- Richard, Duke of Gloucester (1482–)
- Thomas Dacre, 2nd Baron Dacre (1495–)
- Arthur, Prince of Wales (1498–1502?) died 1502
- Thomas Dacre, 2nd Baron Dacre (1509–1525)
- Henry FitzRoy, 1st Duke of Richmond and Somerset (1525–)
- Henry Percy, 6th Earl of Northumberland (1527–)
- Henry Grey, Marquess of Dorset (April 1551 – September 1551)
- John Dudley, 1st Duke of Northumberland, Warden-general of the Scottish Marches (1551–)
- Henry Carey, 1st Baron Hunsdon Lord Warden-general (1589–)
- Robert Carey, 1st Earl of Monmouth (1596–1598)

=== Warden of the Eastern March ===
- Henry Percy, 1st Earl of Northumberland (1367–) (jointly)
- Gilbert de Umfraville (1369–) (jointly)
- Thomas Percy, 1st Earl of Worcester (1377) (jointly)
- John Neville, 3rd Baron Neville de Raby (1381) (jointly)
- John Neville, 3rd Baron Neville de Raby (1386) (died 1388)
- Thomas Mowbray, 1st Duke of Norfolk (1389–)
- Henry Hotspur Percy (1396–) killed, Shrewsbury, 1403
- Edward of Norwich, 2nd Duke of York (1398–)
- Ralph de Neville, 1st Earl of Westmorland (1403)
- John of Lancaster, 1st Duke of Bedford (1403–1414)
- Edward of Norwich, 2nd Duke of York (1414–1415)
- Richard Grey, 4th Baron Grey of Codnor (1415–?1418)
- Henry Percy, 2nd Earl of Northumberland (1417–1434)
- Richard Neville, 5th Earl of Salisbury (1434–1435)
- Henry Percy, 2nd Earl of Northumberland (1435–)
- John de Mowbray, 3rd Duke of Norfolk (1437)
- Sir Robert Ogle (1438) (jointly)
- Sir Ralph Grey (1438) (jointly)
- Henry Percy, 3rd Earl of Northumberland (1439–)
- Richard Neville, 16th Earl of Warwick (1461)
- John Neville, 1st Marquess of Montagu (1463–1470)
- Henry Percy, 4th Earl of Northumberland(1471–1485) assassinated 1489
- Henry Percy, 5th Earl of Northumberland (1503–)
- Thomas Darcy, 1st Baron Darcy de Darcy (1505–1511)
- Henry Percy, 6th Earl of Northumberland (1527–)
- William Eure, 1st Baron Eure, (1539–1548)
- William Grey, 13th Baron Grey de Wilton (1547–)
- Sir Robert Bowes (1548–1551)
- John Conyers, 3rd Baron Conyers (1553–) (died 1557)
- Thomas Percy, 7th Earl of Northumberland (1557–)
- Sir Ralph Sadler (1559)
- William Grey, 13th Baron Grey de Wilton (1559–)
- Francis Russell, 2nd Earl of Bedford (1564–1567)
- Henry Carey, 1st Baron Hunsdon (1568–?1596)
- Robert Carey (1597–1597)
- Peregrine Bertie, 13th Baron Willoughby de Eresby (1598–)

=== Warden of the Middle March ===
- Sir William Lilburn (13th century)
- Henry Percy, 2nd Earl of Northumberland (1417–1434)
- Thomas Dacre, 2nd Baron Dacre (1509–)
- Thomas Darcy, 1st Baron Darcy de Darcy (1511–)
- Sir Ralph Eure (1544–1545)
- Sir Robert Bowes (1545–1551)
- Thomas Wharton, 1st Baron Wharton (1556)
- Thomas Percy, 7th Earl of Northumberland (1557–)
- William Grey, 13th Baron Grey de Wilton (1559–)
- Sir John Forster (1560–1595)
- William Eure, 2nd Baron Eure (1595)
- Ralph Eure, 3rd Baron Eure (1595)
- Robert Carey, 1st Earl of Monmouth (1596–1598)

=== Warden of the Western March ===
- Andrew Harclay, 1st Earl of Carlisle (1319–) (executed 1323)
- Thomas Lucy (1346) (jointly)
- Ralph Dacre, 3rd Baron Dacre (1366–1371)
- Henry Scrope, 1st Baron Scrope of Masham (1370–1371)
- Ralph Dacre, 3rd Baron Dacre (1372) (died 1375)
- Hugh Dacre, 4th Baron Dacre (1379–1382)
- Henry Percy, 1st Earl of Northumberland (1384–) and Henry Hotspur Percy (1384–) (jointly)
- Thomas de Clifford, 6th Baron de Clifford (1386–) (jointly)
- Ralph de Neville, 1st Earl of Westmorland (1386–) (jointly)
- John Beaumont, 4th Baron Beaumont (1389)
- John Holland, 1st Duke of Exeter (1398–) (executed in 1400)
- Edmund of Langley, 1st Duke of York (1399– ) (died 1402)
- Henry Percy, 1st Earl of Northumberland (1399–)
- Ralph de Neville, 1st Earl of Westmorland (1403–1414)
- John Neville, Lord Neville (1414–1420)
- Richard Neville, 5th Earl of Salisbury (1420–1435)
- Richard Neville, 5th Earl of Salisbury (1446–) and Richard Neville, 16th Earl of Warwick (1446–) (jointly – never took office)
- Richard Neville, 16th Earl of Warwick (1453–)
- Richard Neville, 16th Earl of Warwick (1461–1469)
- King Richard Plantagenet, Duke of Gloucester (1471–1485) (killed, Bosworth, 1485)
- Henry Percy, 4th Earl of Northumberland(−1489) (assassinated 1489)
- Thomas Dacre, 2nd Baron Dacre (1490–) (Lord Warden 1509–1525) (died 1525)
- William Dacre, 3rd Baron Dacre (1527–1534)
- Henry Clifford, 1st Earl of Cumberland (1534–1542)
- Thomas Wharton (c. 1542–1549)
- John Conyers, 3rd Baron Conyers (1551–1553)
- Henry Scrope, 9th Baron Scrope of Bolton (c. 1560–1591)
- Sir Richard Lowther (1591–1593)
- Thomas Scrope, 10th Baron Scrope of Bolton (1593–1603) (last Warden)

== For Scotland ==
=== Lord Warden-general of all the March ===
- William Douglas, 1st Earl of Douglas (1356–)
- John Stewart, Lord of Kyle
- Patrick V, Earl of March
- Archibald Douglas, 3rd Earl of Douglas (1364–1400)
- Archibald Douglas, 4th Earl of Douglas (1400–)
- William Douglas, 8th Earl of Douglas (1450–) killed 1452
- Adam Hepburn, 2nd Earl of Bothwell (1514–)
- Antoine d'Arces, Sieur de la Bastie (1516–) killed 1517
- Archibald Douglas, 8th Earl of Angus (1574–)
- William Ruthven, 1st Earl of Gowrie ( 1578)
- James Stewart, Earl of Arran (1584–)
- Alexander Home, 6th Lord Home (1603)

=== Warden of the Eastern March ===
- William Douglas, 1st Earl of Douglas jointly with the Earl of March (1356–)
- Archibald Douglas, 4th Earl of Douglas (1400)
- Archibald Douglas, 4th Earl of Douglas and George, 4th Earl of Angus (1449) (jointly)
- Alexander Home, 1st Lord Home (c1475)
- James Stewart, 1st Earl of Buchan (1479–)
- Archibald Douglas, 5th Earl of Angus (1481–)
- Alexander Home, 2nd Lord Home (1489–1496)
- Patrick Hepburn, 1st Earl of Bothwell (1499)
- Alexander Home, 3rd Lord Home (1506) (died 1516)
- Archibald Douglas, 6th Earl of Angus (1525–)
- George Home, 4th Lord Home (1543–) (died 1549)
- Alexander Home, 5th Lord Home (1550–)
- Sir James Home of Cowdenknowes (1573–)
- Alexander Home, 6th Lord Home (1582–1589)
- Sir George Home of Wedderburn, (1597)

=== Warden of the Middle March ===
- Sir William Douglas (1343–)
- William Douglas, 2nd Earl of Angus (1433–)
- George Douglas, 4th Earl of Angus (1449–)
- Andrew Ker of Cessford (1457–)
- James Stewart, 1st Earl of Buchan (1479–)
- Walter Ker of Cessford (1502–)
- Ralph and Andrew Ker (1510–)
- Alexander Home, 3rd Lord Home (1509–)
- Sir Robert Ker of Caverton (1514) killed 1514
- Sir Andrew Ker of Cessford (1515)
- William Ker of Cessford
- Archibald Douglas, 6th Earl of Angus (1525–)
- Walter Ker of Cessford (1541–)
- Walter Scott of Branxholme and Buccleuch (1550–1552) murdered 1552
- James Hepburn, 4th Earl of Bothwell (1558–)
- Sir Walter Ker of Cessford (1560–)
- William Ker of Cessford (1583–)
- Sir Thomas Ker of Ferniehirst (1584–)
- Ludovic Stewart, 2nd Duke of Lennox (1592–)
- Sir John Cary (1601–)

=== Warden of the Western March ===
- Sir James Douglas (1314–1330)
- Sir Archibald Douglas (1364)
- Sir Archibald Douglas (1368–1388)
- Sir John Johnston, Laird of Johnston (1388–1400)
- Archibald Douglas, 4th Earl of Douglas (1400–1419)
- Sir Adam Johnston, Laird of Johnston (1419–1450) First Term
- William Douglas, 8th Earl of Douglas (1450–) killed 1452
- Sir Adam Johnston, Laird of Johnston (1452–1454) Second Term
- Andrew Stewart, 1st Lord Avandale (1456–)
- Sir John Johnston, Laird of Johnston (1459–1475)
- Alexander Stewart, Duke of Albany (1475)
- Robert Maxwell, 2nd Lord Maxwell (1476–1485)
- John Maxwell, 4th Lord Maxwell (1486–1489)
- Patrick Hepburn, 1st Earl of Bothwell (1489–1503)
- Sir Adam Johnston, Laird of Johnston (1503–1509)
- Sir James Johnston, Laird of Johnston (1509–1515)
- Robert Maxwell, 5th Lord Maxwell (1515–1546)
- Sir John Johnston, Laird of Johnston (1546–1553)
- Sir James Douglas, 7th Baron Drumlanrig (1553–)
- James Hepburn, 4th Earl of Bothwell (1558–)
- Sir John Maxwell (1561–)
- Archibald Douglas, 8th Earl of Angus (1574–)
- Sir John Johnston, Laird of Johnston (1580–1585)
- John Maxwell, 7th Lord Maxwell (−1585) dismissed 1585
- William Maxwell, Lord Herries (1587–1588)
- Sir John Carmichael (1588–1590)
- John Maxwell, 7th Lord Maxwell (1590–) killed 1593
- William Douglas, 10th Earl of Angus (1592–1593)
- Robert Maxwell, Lord Herries (1593–1595)
- Sir James Johnston, Laird of Johnston (1595–1598) First Term
- Sir John Carmichael (1598–) killed 1600
- Sir James Johnston, Laird of Johnston (1600–1608) Second Term Killed 1608
- Alexander Home, 1st Earl of Home (1608–)

== See also ==
- Scottish Borders
- Anglo-Scottish border
- Border Reivers
- Debatable Lands, land lying between England and Scotland, formerly in question to which it belonged, when they were distinct kingdoms.
- The Scots' Dike which was dug in 1552 to divide up the Debatable lands.
- Welsh Marches, between England and Wales
- The Borderers (Television series)
- Scottish Marches
