= Samuelston =

Small Scottish town in East Lothian

Coordinates: 55.929°N 2.828°W

Samuelston (Scots: Sammelstoun) is a small town just outside of Haddington, East Lothian. It has a population of 957.

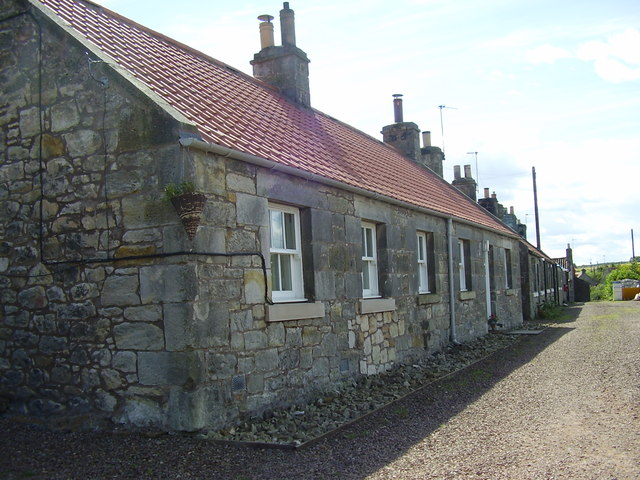
Samuelston

George Ker, laird of Samuelston, supervised building work at the church of Ladykirk for James IV. His daughter Nichola Ker married Alexander Home, 2nd Lord Home.
