= Walter Ker of Cessford =

Scottish warden

Sir Walter Ker of Cessford (died c. 1585) was a Scottish warden of the Middle March on the Anglo-Scottish border.

== Life ==
The eldest son of Sir Andrew Ker of Cessford, by his wife Agnes, daughter of Robert, second lord Crichton of Sanquhar, he was served heir to his father 12 May 1528. He had charters of various lands on 23 April and 21 September 1542, and in 1543 he received the lands and barony of Cessford, with its castle.

In October 1552 Sir Walter Scott of Branxholme and Buccleuch was killed in the High Street of Edinburgh in a nocturnal encounter with the Kers, headed by Walter Ker of Cessfurd. On 8 December they petitioned the privy council, offering to submit to anything to save their lives and heritages. It was decided that they should be banished to France; but on 16 May 1553 they received a full pardon. On 9 August of this year Cessfurd, with John Ker of Ferniehirst and Andrew Ker of Hirsell, signed a bond to John Hamilton, the archbishop of St. Andrews, and James Hamilton, 3rd Earl of Arran.

On 28 August 1559 Cessford was appointed one of the commissioners to treat for the ransoming of prisoners taken by the English. As a Catholic sympathised with the queen-regent, but in April 1560 he went with Lord Home to the camp of the lords of the congregation. On the return of the young Queen Mary to Scotland, Cessfurd was reappointed to his old office of warden of the middle march.

Mary, Queen of Scots, wrote to the Laird of Cessford from Edinburgh Castle on 25 September 1566. She was planning her first visit to Teviotdale to administer justice, and asked him to come to Edinburgh to give her advice. She visited Kelso in November.

When the chiefs of the border clans were ordered in 1567 to enter Edinburgh Castle on the pretext that they might hinder the success of Bothwell's expedition into Liddesdale, Cessfurd was the only one except Ker of Ferniehirst who obeyed. He was one of the chief leaders against the queen at the battle of Carberry Hill, and also at the battle of Langside, where he fought side by side with Lord Home. On 3 April 1569 he signed the bond of Teviotdale, promising obedience to the regent and he served under Morton at the siege of Edinburgh. When Ker of Ferniehirst and others of the queen's party advanced to plunder Jedburgh in 1571, the inhabitants sent to Cessfurd for assistance, and by his aid and that of Lord Ruthven the attackers were routed.

Cessfurd was one of those who, under Atholl and Argyll, took up arms against Morton in 1578. In 1582 he signed the bond which resulted in the raid of Ruthven. He died in 1584 or 1585.

== Family ==
By his wife Isabel, daughter of Andrew Ker of Ferniehirst, he had two sons: Andrew, who predeceased him, and William, warden of the middle marches; and two daughters: Agnes, married to John Edmonstoune of Edmonstoune, and Margaret, to Alexander Home, 5th Lord Home.

== Cultural influence ==
He was played by Ian Cuthbertson in the TV series The Borderers.

== See also ==
- Cessford Castle
