= Alexander Home, 2nd Lord Home =

Scottish nobleman and soldier

Alexander Home, 2nd Lord Home (c.1450s – 5 September 1506) was a Scottish nobleman and soldier, Lord Chamberlain of Scotland and Warden of the Eastern March.

== Life ==
Lord Home was the son of Alexander Home, Master of Home and Agnes Hepburn, daughter of Adam Hepburn, Master of Hailes, father of Patrick Hepburn, 1st Lord Hailes. He succeeded his grandfather Alexander Home, 1st Lord Home as Lord Home in 1492. He was a leading participant at the Battle of Sauchieburn in 1488, in the successful attempt to depose James III with his son James IV in 1488. Following the battle, he was made privy councillor and Lord Chamberlain to the underage King. In June 1497, with the Earl of Angus, he opened talks for the surrender of Perkin Warbeck at 'Jenyn Haugh'.

== Marriage and issue ==
Lord Home married twice. Firstly, he married Isabel Douglas (div. 1476), and had one daughter with her, Anna Home, who married Sir William Cockburn of Langton (d. 1513 at the Battle of Flodden). Secondly, he married Nichola Ker, daughter of Sir George Ker of Samuelston and Mariota Sinclair, with whom he had issue:

- Alexander Home, 3rd Lord Home
- George Home, 4th Lord Home
- John Home, Abbot of Jedburgh
- Patrick Home
- William Home (d. 1516)
- Andrew Home
- David Home, Prior of Coldingham
- Elizabeth Home, married firstly to Thomas Hay, Master of Yester, married secondly to James Hamilton, 1st Earl of Arran.
- Mariota Home, married John Lindsay, 6th Earl of Crawford.
- Nichola Home, married firstly to Andrew Herries, 2nd Lord Herries of Terregles (c. 1477 – d. 1513 at the Battle of Flodden), married secondly to Patrick Hepburn.

== Sources ==
- Balfour Paul, Sir J., Scots Peerage IX vols. Edinburgh 1904.

Peerage of Scotland
Preceded by Alexander Home	Lord Home; 1492–1506	Succeeded by Alexander Home
