= Earl of Home =

Title in the Peerage of Scotland

Earldom of Home
- Coat of arms of the Earl of Home
- Creation date: 1605
- Peerage: Peerage of Scotland
- First holder: Alexander Home, 6th Lord Home
- Present holder: Michael Douglas-Home, 16th Earl of Home
- Heir apparent: Leo Gregory Cospatrick Douglas-Home, Lord Dunglass
- Subsidiary titles: Lord Home; Lord Dunglass; Baron Douglas
- Seats: The Hirsel; Castlemains
- Former seats: Dunglass Castle, Hume Castle, Fast Castle, Bothwell Castle

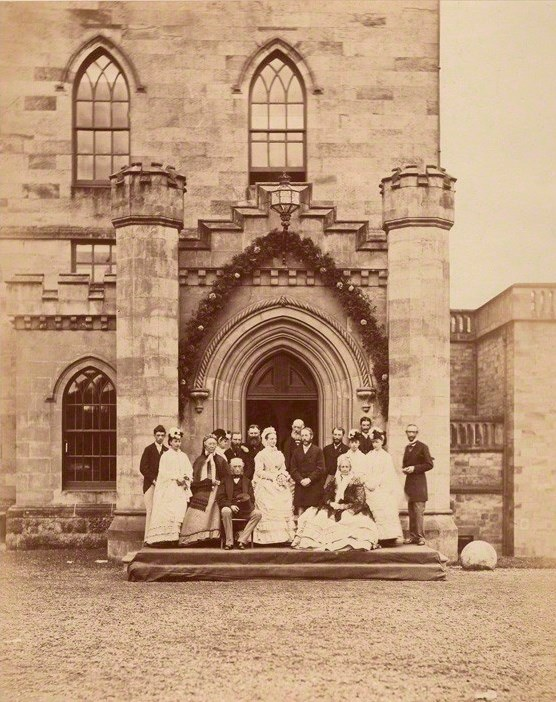
The 11th Earl and Countess of Home (seated) at the marriage of their son Lord Dunglass, Douglas Castle, 1870

Earl of Home (/ˈhjuːm/ HEWM) is a title in the Peerage of Scotland. It was created in 1605 for Alexander Home of that Ilk, 6th Lord Home. The Earl of Home holds, among others, the subsidiary titles of Lord Home (created 1473) and Lord Dunglass (1605) in the Peerage of Scotland, and Baron Douglas, of Douglas in the County of Lanark (1875), in the Peerage of the United Kingdom. Various Earls of Home have also claimed the title of Lord Hume of Berwick. The Earl is also Chief of the Name and Arms of Home and heir general to the House of Douglas. The title of Lord Dunglass is used as a courtesy title by the eldest son of the Earl.

The most famous recent holder of the title was the 14th Earl, Alexander Frederick Douglas-Home, better known as Sir Alec Douglas-Home. After the unexpected resignation of Harold Macmillan, the 14th Earl was named prime minister by the monarch. For the first time in over sixty years, a sitting prime minister was a member of the House of Lords rather than of the House of Commons. Because he believed that it was impractical and unconventional to remain a member of the Lords, the Earl disclaimed his peerages on 23 October 1963 under the Peerage Act passed in the same year. He then contested the House of Commons seat of Kinross and Western Perthshire by standing in the 1963 Kinross and Western Perthshire by-election. The seat had been vacated by the death of the previous Member of Parliament, Gilmour Leburn. As of 2022 the titles are held by the 16th Earl, Michael David Alexander Douglas-Home, who succeeded in that year.

The family seats are The Hirsel near Coldstream, Berwickshire, and Castlemains near Douglas, South Lanarkshire. Former seats include Douglas Castle (mostly demolished), Dunglass Castle (demolished), Tantallon Castle (ruined) and Bothwell Castle (in the care of the state).

== Origins ==
The Earls of Home descend in the male line from Cospatric I (died after 1073), Earl of Northumbria, who was the maternal grandson of Northumbrian ealdorman Uhtred the Bold and his third wife, Ælfgifu, daughter of King Æthelred II. His descendant William de Home (son of Sir Patrick de Greenlaw, the second son of Cospatric III, Earl of Lothian), adopted the surname following his acquisition of the lands of Home in Berwickshire during the early 13th century, through his marriage to his second cousin Ada (the daughter of Patrick I, Earl of Dunbar). William's arms featured the silver lion of Dunbar but with a green field instead of a red field, in reference to his lands of Greenlaw.

== Lords Home (1473) ==
- Alexander Home, 1st Lord Home (died 1490)
- Alexander Home, 2nd Lord Home (died 1506)
- Alexander Home, 3rd Lord Home (died 1516)
- George Home, 4th Lord Home (died 1549)
- Alexander Home, 5th Lord Home (died 1575)
- Alexander Home, 6th Lord Home (c. 1566–1619) (created Earl of Home in 1605)

== Earls of Home (1605) ==
- Alexander Home, 1st Earl of Home (c. 1566–1619)
- James Home, 2nd Earl of Home (died 1633)
- James Home, 3rd Earl of Home (c. 1615–1666)
- Alexander Home, 4th Earl of Home (died 1674)
- James Home, 5th Earl of Home (died 1687)
- Charles Home, 6th Earl of Home (died 1706)
- Alexander Home, 7th Earl of Home (died 1720)
- William Home, 8th Earl of Home (died 1761)
- Alexander Home, 9th Earl of Home (died 1786)
- Alexander Home, 10th Earl of Home (1769–1841)
- Cospatrick Alexander Home, 11th Earl of Home (1799–1881) (created Baron Douglas in 1875)
- Charles Alexander Douglas-Home, 12th Earl of Home (1834–1918)
- Charles Cospatrick Archibald Douglas-Home, 13th Earl of Home (1873–1951)
- Alexander Frederick Douglas-Home, 14th Earl of Home (1903–1995) (disclaimed 1963) (created Baron Home of the Hirsel in 1974)
- David Alexander Cospatrick Douglas-Home, 15th Earl of Home (1943–2022)
- Michael David Alexander Douglas-Home, 16th Earl of Home (born 1987)

== Present Earl ==
Michael David Alexander Douglas-Home, 16th Earl of Home, was born on 30 November 1987, the only son of the 15th Earl and his wife Jane Margaret Williams-Wynne. He has two older sisters, Lady Iona Katherine (born 1980) and Lady Mary Elizabeth (born 1982), and was Page of Honour to Queen Elizabeth II from 1997 to 2000.

Styled as Lord Dunglass between 1995 and 2022, in 2017 he married Sally Antoinette Underhill, a daughter of Group Captain Gregory B. P. Underhill. On 22 August 2022 he succeeded to the peerages and to the estate of The Hirsel.

His son Leo Gregory Cospatrick born in 2024 is the heir apparent. The heir presumptive had been the present earl's second cousin, Alexander Sholto Douglas-Home (born 1962), a great-grandson of the 13th earl.

Line of succession, simplified
- Charles Douglas-Home, 13th Earl of Home (1873–1951)
  - Alexander Frederick Douglas-Home, Baron Home of the Hirsel (1903–1995)
    - David Douglas-Home, 15th Earl of Home (1943–2022)
      - Michael Douglas-Home, 16th Earl of Home (born 1987)
        - (1). Leo Gregory Cospatrick Douglas-Home, Lord Dunglass (born 2024)
  - Hon. Henry Montagu Douglas-Home (1907–1980)
    - Cecil Robin Douglas-Home (1932–1968)
      - (2). Alexander Sholto Douglas-Home (born 1962)
        - (3). Louis Robin Douglas-Home (born 1999)
    - Charles Cospatrick Douglas-Home (1937–1985)
      - (4). Tara John Douglas-Home (born 1969)
        - (5). Nicholas Charles Aernout Douglas-Home (born 2002)
      - (6). Luke Cospatrick Douglas-Home (born 1971)

There are further male descendants of the younger sons of the 13th Earl in the line of succession.

== Arms ==
Coat of arms of the Earl of Home
Notes Arms of the 12th and later Earls with the collar of the Order of the Thistle (for the 12th to 15th Earls). Coronet The coronet of an Earl. Crest 1st, on a cap of maintenance proper, a lion’s head erased argent (Home); 2nd, on a cap of maintenance proper, a salamander vert, encircled with flames of fire proper (Douglas). Escutcheon Quarterly: 1st and 4th grand quarters counter-quartered, 1st and 4th vert, a lion rampant argent, armed and langued gules (Home); 2nd and 3rd argent, three popinjays vert, beaked and membered gules (Pepdie of Dunglas); overall an escutcheon or, charged with an orle azure (Landale); 2nd and 3rd grand quarters counter-quartered, 1st azure, a lion rampant argent, armed and langued gules, crowned with an imperial crown or (Lordship of Galloway); 2nd or, a lion rampant gules, armed and langued azure, debruised of a ribbon sable (Abernethy); 3rd argent, three piles gules (Lordship of Brechin); 4th or, a fesse checky azure and argent, surmounted of a bend sable, charged with three buckles of the field (Stewart of Bonkill); overall on an escutcheon argent, a man's heart, ensigned with an imperial crown proper, and a chief azure, charged with three mullets of the field (Douglas). Supporters Two lions argent, armed and langued gules. Motto True to the end.

== See also ==
- Clan Home
- Clan Douglas
