= George Home, 4th Lord Home =

Scottish nobleman

George Home, 4th Lord Home (died 1549) was a Scottish nobleman and Warden of the Eastern March.

The son of Alexander Home, 2nd Lord Home and his wife Nicola Ker, daughter of George Ker of Samuelston, he succeeded his brother, Alexander Home, 3rd Lord Home, when he died on 8 October 1516.

By 1522, he had rebuilt Fast Castle. George married Mariotta (Marion or Mary) Haliburton, daughter of Patrick Haliburton of Dirleton, before 30 October 1531. Their son was Alexander Home, 5th Lord Home. A daughter Margaret married Alexander Erskine of Gogar.

George led Scottish cavalry at a skirmish before the Battle of Pinkie Cleugh. George was injured, and while he lay sick at Edinburgh, Mariotta negotiated the surrender of Hume Castle on 22 September 1547.

== Footnotes ==
Peerage of Scotland
Preceded by Alexander Home	Lord Home; 1516–1549	Succeeded by Alexander Home
