= Alexander Home, 3rd Lord Home =

Scottish soldier and nobleman

Alexander Home, 3rd Lord Home (died 1516) was a Scottish soldier and nobleman, Chamberlain of Scotland and Warden of the Eastern March. He fought at the Battle of Flodden where his forces defeated the English right wing before the Scottish army was destroyed. After the battle, he resisted the regency of John Stewart, Duke of Albany and was captured and executed for rebellion.

== Life ==
Home was the son of Alexander Home, 2nd Lord Home, by Nicholace Ker, a daughter of George Ker of Samuelston. His father was Great Chamberlain to James IV of Scotland from 7 October 1488. Alexander succeeded his father as Lord Home, Chamberlain and Warden of the Eastern and Middle Marches in 1506, and was confirmed in these honours by royal charter in February 1510. In 1507 he bought the lands and burgh of Gordon from the Earl of Huntly.

In August 1513 Home led 3000 Border horsemen on a raid into England. En route back to Scotland laden with booty, his force was ambushed by William Bulmer of Brancepeth Castle at Milfield, and was routed, losing 1000 men and his standard. Home himself escaped but his brother George Home was captured.

A month later, on 9 September, Home's horsemen were part of the Scottish force that fought at the Battle of Flodden. Home and the Earl of Huntly's contingent formed the vanguard of the Scottish army. Despite the outcome of that day, Home's men defeated the right wing of the English army led by Edmund Howard. Home escaped the slaughter, though leaving many of his kinsmen on the field. He attempted unsuccessfully to recapture the taken Scottish artillery some days later.

== Doun wi' Lord Hume ==
After the death of James IV of Scotland at Flodden, Lord Home did not accept the rule of Regent Albany. Although he had supported the appointment of Albany as governor, a legend says that when they first met at Dumbarton Castle, the Regent joked about Lord Home's small stature, quoting minuit praesentia famam meaning 'the appearance doesn't live up to report.' Their relationship deteriorated, and Home wrote to Lord Dacre in England in August 1515 saying that Albany wished him exiled from Scotland and Margaret Tudor agreed. He hoped for English help. Albany captured Hume Castle in September and ordered Home to meet him at Dunglass. There, Lord Home was arrested and taken to Edinburgh Castle. His jailer was his brother-in-law, the Earl of Arran. Home persuaded Arran to escape with him and they joined another rebel, the Earl of Angus, on the borders. In Glasgow they captured ammunition sent by Francis I of France and threw it down a well. Home attacked Dunbar Castle, then captured the Chief Herald, the Lyon King of Arms at Coldstream and held him ransom for his mother who was a prisoner of Albany's lieutenant Antoine d'Arces.

After offering a pardon, Albany invited Home and his brother William to Holyroodhouse. They were arrested and William was imprisoned on the island fortress of Inchgarvie. Lord Home was accused of the murder of James IV at Flodden, then of failing to prevent English re-fortification at Norham Castle. Finally he and William were charged with rebellion against Albany and beheaded, and their heads displayed on the gable of Edinburgh Tolbooth.

== Marriage and issue ==
Lord Home married Lady Agnes Stewart, daughter of James Stewart, 1st Earl of Buchan and Margaret Murray. She was the widow of Adam Hepburn, 2nd Earl of Bothwell and owner of Crichton Castle. They had a daughter:

- Janet Home, who married John Hamilton of Samuelston (a.k.a. Clydesdale John), illegitimate son of James Hamilton, 1st Earl of Arran by his mistress, Beatrix Drummond.

Home also fathered several illegitimate children:

- John Home
- Alison Home
- Isabel Home

Lord Home was eventually succeeded, following the reversal of his forfeiture, by his brother, George Home, 4th Lord Home.

== Sources ==
- Balfour Paul, Sir J., Scots Peerage IX vols. Edinburgh 1904.

Peerage of Scotland
| Preceded by Alexander Home | Lord Home; 1506–1516 | Succeeded by George Home |
