= Jean de Beaugué =

French writer

Jean de Beaugué, was a French soldier who served in Scotland in the 1540s during the war of the Rough Wooing. He wrote a memoir of the fighting, which first published in 1556 is still an important source for historians. Much of the book concerns the activities of the French commander in Scotland, André de Montalembert, who is often called d'Esse in British histories.

Beaugué describes the siege of Haddington, fighting at Ferniehirst Castle, and the capture of James Wilford, an English officer, amongst many incidents. However, the text does not much refer to Beaugué, and little or nothing is known of him from other sources. Jean de Beaugué dedicated his book to François de Montmorency.

== Editions ==
The full French title of the memoir translates as: "The Story of the War of Scotland: Showing how the Kingdom was assailed and for the most part Occupied by the English and since rendered peacable to the Queen and brought to its Ancient Estate and Dignity." Three 1556 Paris editions from different publisher book-sellers are known; all identical except for the title matter.

- L'Histoire de la Guerre d'Ecosse, Gilles Corrozet, Paris (1556); and Estienne Groulleau, Paris (1556)
- digitized Vincent Sertenas (1556) edition from the Bibliotheque Nationale de France
- Charles Forbes de le Montalembert, ed., Histoire de la Guerre d'Ecosse, Bordeaux (1862)
- Histoire de la Guerre d'Écosse pendant les campagnes 1548 et 1549, Maitland Club, Edinburgh (1830)
- Patrick Abercromby's English translation; History of the Campaigns of 1548 and 1549, (1707)
