= David Douglas-Home, 15th Earl of Home =

British banker and peer (1943–2022)

The Right Honourable The Earl of Home KT CVO CBE
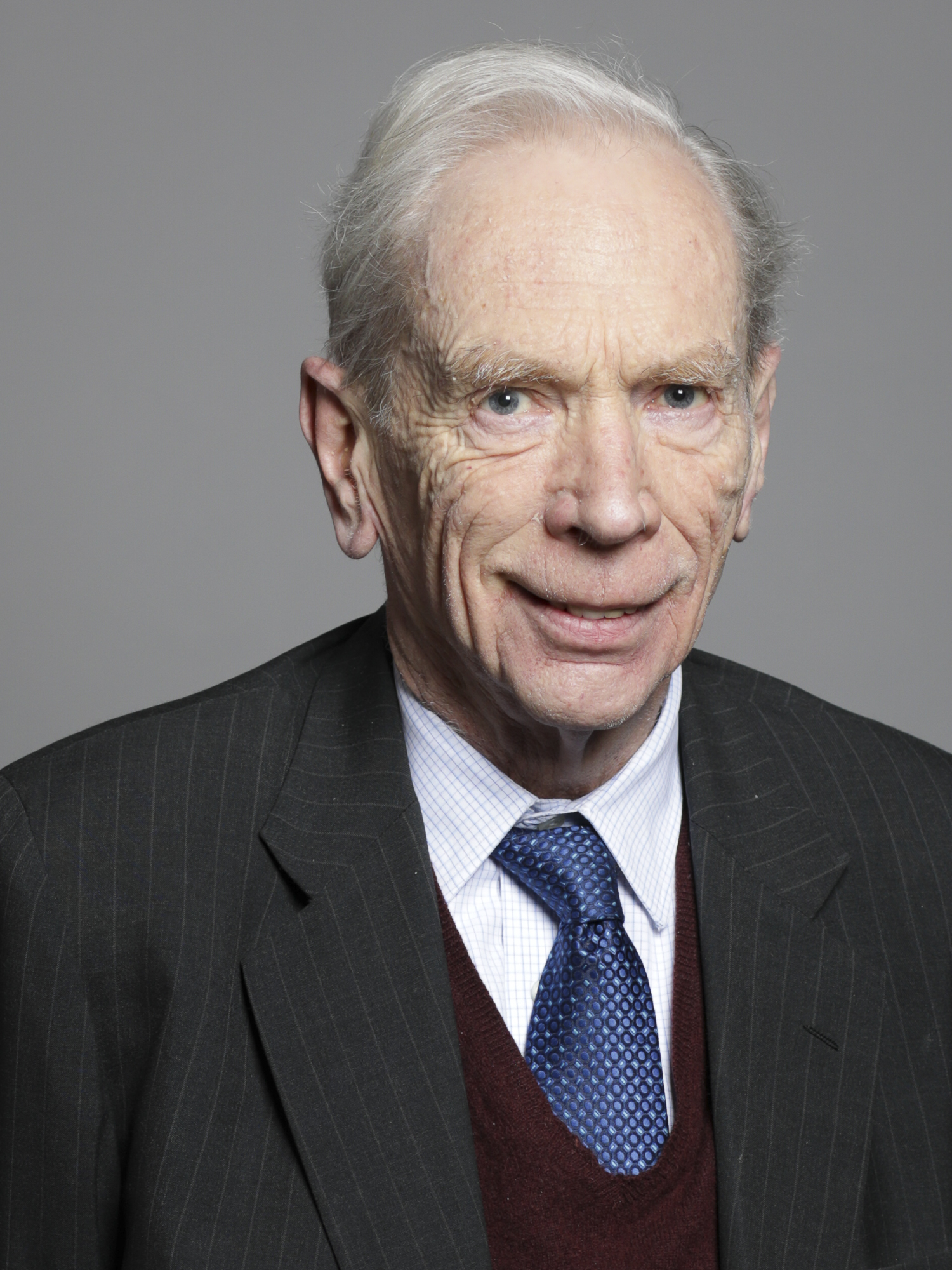
- Official portrait, 2020

Member of the House of Lords
- Lord Temporal
- Hereditary peerage 24 September 1996 – 11 November 1999
- Preceded by: 14th Earl of Home (disclaimed, 1963)
- Succeeded by: Seat abolished
- Elected Hereditary Peer; 11 November 1999 – 22 August 2022
- Election: 1999
- Preceded by: Seat established
- Succeeded by: The 5th Baron Ashcombe

Personal details
- Born: David Alexander Cospatrick Douglas-Home; 20 November 1943 London, England
- Died: 22 August 2022 (aged 78) The Hirsel, Berwickshire, Scotland
- Party: Conservative
- Spouse: Jane Williams-Wynn (m. 1972)
- Children: 3
- Parents: Alec Douglas-Home (father); Elizabeth Alington (mother)
- Education: Christ Church, Oxford

David Alexander Cospatrick Douglas-Home, 15th Earl of Home, KT, CVO, CBE (/ˈhjuːm/ HEWM; 20 November 1943 – 22 August 2022) was a British banker and hereditary peer. He was a Conservative member of the House of Lords from 1996 until his death in 2022.

== Background and education ==
Home was born in London, the only son of Alec Douglas-Home, the 14th Earl of Home and British prime minister and later Lord Home of the Hirsel, and Elizabeth Alington, daughter of Cyril Alington. He was educated at Ludgrove School, Eton College, and Christ Church, Oxford.

In 1963, the year his father disclaimed his earldom (and became prime minister), David discontinued the use of his courtesy title, Lord Dunglass.

== Career ==
Home succeeded to his father's disclaimed earldom after his death in October 1995. When the hereditary peers of the House of Lords were reduced under the House of Lords Act 1999, he was elected as one of the 92 that were allowed to remain. He sat as a Conservative, having served some time on the Conservative front bench.

Apart from his political career, Lord Home worked in finance. In 1974, he joined Morgan Grenfell and worked in Egypt, Hong Kong, and Thailand. From 1999 to 2013, he was chairman of the private bank Coutts & Co.

He was also President of the British Association for Shooting and Conservation and Chief of the Name and Arms of Home.

Home was appointed a Knight of the Order of the Thistle (KT) in the 2014 New Year Honours.

== Personal life ==
Lord Home married Jane Margaret Williams-Wynne (born 20 February 1949), of the Williams-Wynn baronet family, in 1972. They had three children:

- Lady Iona Katherine Douglas-Home (born 1980), married the Hon. James Thomas Wingfield Hewitt (born 1979), son and heir of the 9th Viscount Lifford, on 5 April 2008. They have three sons:
  - Harry Alexander Wyldbore Hewitt (born 9 February 2010)
  - Rory David Wingfield Hewitt (born 3 February 2012)
  - Nico James Cospatrick Hewitt (born 15 May 2015)
- Lady Mary Elizabeth Douglas-Home (born 1982), married Christopher Gurth Clothier but then separated in 2018. They have two daughters:
  - Eira Thursday Clothier (born 5 January 2013)
  - Seren Bright Clothier (born 10 November 2014)
- Michael David Alexander Douglas-Home, 16th Earl of Home (born 30 November 1987), married to Sally Underhill

=== Death ===
Lord Home died from lung disease at The Hirsel on 22 August 2022, at the age of 78. He was succeeded in the earldom by his only son, Michael.

== Honours and arms ==
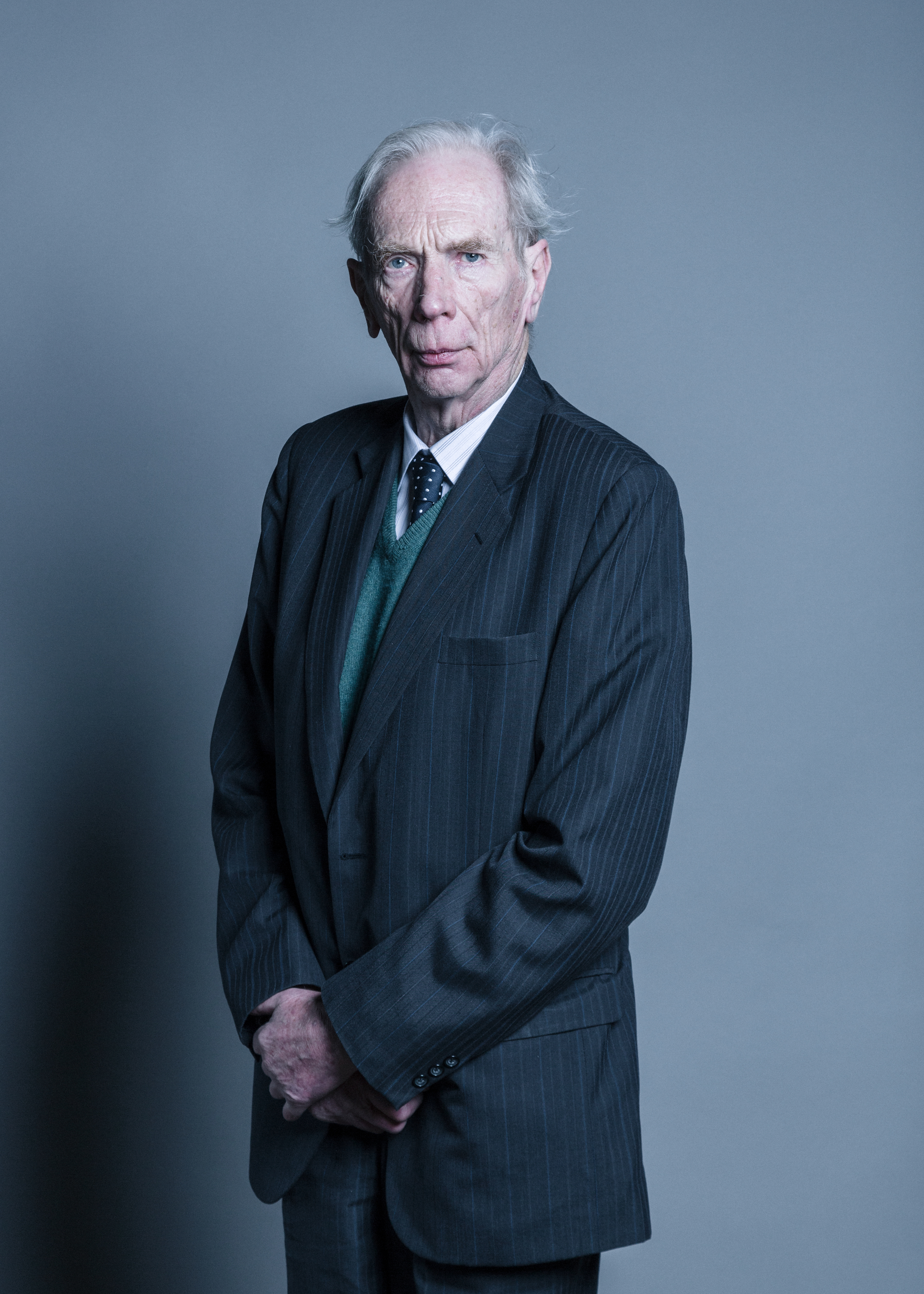
Portrait by Chris McAndrew, 2018

=== Honours ===
Ribbon	Description	Date
	Knight of the Most Ancient and Most Noble Order of the Thistle (KT)	31 December 2013
	Commander of the Royal Victorian Order (CVO)	14 June 1997
	Commander of the Most Excellent Order of the British Empire (CBE)	31 December 1990

=== Arms ===
Coat of arms of David Douglas-Home, 15th Earl of Home
Notes Arms of the 12th and later Earls with the collar of the Order of the Thistle (for the 12th to 15th Earls). Coronet The coronet of an Earl. Crest 1st, on a cap of maintenance proper, a lion's head erased argent (Home); 2nd, on a cap of maintenance proper, a salamander vert, encircled with flames of fire proper (Douglas). Escutcheon Quarterly: 1st and 4th grand quarters counter-quartered, 1st and 4th vert, a lion rampant argent, armed and langued gules (Home); 2nd and 3rd argent, three popinjays vert, beaked and membered gules (Pepdie of Dunglas); overall an escutcheon or, charged with an orle azure (Landale); 2nd and 3rd grand quarters counter-quartered, 1st azure, a lion rampant argent, armed and langued gules, crowned with an imperial crown or (Lordship of Galloway); 2nd or, a lion rampant gules, armed and langued azure, debruised of a ribbon sable (Abernethy); 3rd argent, three piles gules (Lordship of Brechin); 4th or, a fesse checky azure and argent, surmounted of a bend sable, charged with three buckles of the field (Stewart of Bonkill); overall on an escutcheon argent, a man's heart, ensigned with an imperial crown proper, and a chief azure, charged with three mullets of the field (Douglas). Supporters Two lions argent, armed and langued gules. Motto True to the end.

== Ancestry ==
Ancestors of David Douglas-Home, 15th Earl of Home

Charles Douglas-Home, 12th Earl of Home
Charles Douglas-Home, 13th Earl of Home
Maria Grey
Alexander Douglas-Home, Baron Home of the Hirsel
Frederick Lambton, 4th Earl of Durham
Lady Lilian Lambton
Beatrix Bulteel
David Douglas-Home, 15th Earl of Home
The Rev. Henry Alington
The Very Rev. Cyril Alington
Jane Margaret Booth
Elizabeth Alington
George Lyttelton, 4th Baron Lyttelton
The Hon. Hester Margaret Lyttelton
Sybella Harriet Clive

Peerage of Scotland
Disclaimed Title last held by Alec Douglas-Home	Earl of Home; 1995–2022; Member of the House of Lords (1996–1999)	Succeeded by Michael Douglas-Home
Parliament of the United Kingdom
New office created by the House of Lords Act 1999	Elected hereditary peer to the House of Lords under the House of Lords Act 1999; 1999–2022	Succeeded by The Lord Ashcombe
