= Elizabeth Douglas-Home =

Wife of Alec Douglas-Home

The Right Honourable The Lady Home of the Hirsel
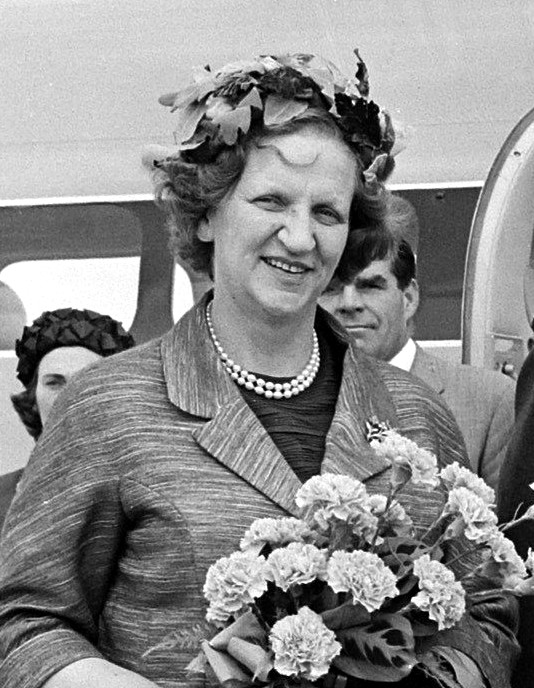
- Douglas-Home in 1963
- Born: Elizabeth Hester Alington; 6 November 1909
- Died: 3 September 1990 (aged 80)
- Known for: Spouse of the prime minister of the United Kingdom (1963–64)
- Spouse: Alec Douglas-Home (m. 1936)
- Children: 4, including David, 15th Earl of Home
- Father: Cyril Alington

Elizabeth Hester Douglas-Home, Baroness Home of the Hirsel (née Alington; 6 November 1909 – 3 September 1990) was the wife of British politician and prime minister Alec Douglas-Home.

== Biography ==
She was born Elizabeth Hester Alington, the second daughter of the Very Rev Cyril Alington—headmaster of Shrewsbury School and Eton College successively, as well as chaplain to King George V—and his wife, Hester Margaret Lyttelton, daughter of George Lyttelton, 4th Baron Lyttelton. Elizabeth was the first woman to become a fellow (governor) of Eton.

She married Alec Douglas-Home on 3 October 1936. Thanks to her husband acquiring and renouncing various titles, she had, according to The Guinness Book of Records, excluding the royal family, changed her title more than any other monogamous woman having been known as: Lady Home of the Hirsel, Lady Douglas-Home, Lady Dunglass, Countess Home and Miss Elizabeth Alington.

The couple had four children:

- Lady (Lavinia) Caroline Douglas-Home DL (b. 11 Oct 1937), who served as a Lady-in-Waiting to various members of the Royal Family
- Lady Meriel Kathleen Douglas-Home (b. 27 Nov 1939), m. Adrian Darby, Bursar of Keble College, Oxford
- Lady Diana Lucy Douglas-Home (18 Dec 1940 - 22 August 2024), m. James Wolfe Murray
- David Alexander Cospatrick Douglas-Home, 15th Earl of Home (20 Nov 1943–22 Aug 2022).

She died on 3 September 1990 at the age of 80. Her husband outlived her by just over five years. They had been married for nearly 54 years.

== Bibliography ==
- Blair, Cherie; Cate Haste (2005). The Goldfish Bowl: Married to the Prime Minister 1955–1997. Vintage. ISBN 978-0-09-946202-6.
- Card, Tim (2004). "Alington, Cyril Argentine". Oxford Dictionary of National Biography (online ed.). Oxford University Press. doi:10.1093/ref:odnb/30379. (Subscription, Wikipedia Library access or UK public library membership required.)
- Guinness Book of Records 1985. Guinness World Records Limited (published 19 October 1984). 1985. ISBN 978-0-85112-419-3.
- Hurd, Douglas (2004). "Home, Alexander Frederick [Alec] Douglas-, fourteenth earl of Home and Baron Home of the Hirsel". Oxford Dictionary of National Biography (online ed.). Oxford University Press.

Unofficial roles
| Preceded by Dorothy Macmillan | Spouse of the Prime Minister of the United Kingdom; 1963–1964 | Succeeded by Mary Wilson |
