= Alec Douglas-Home =

Prime Minister of the United Kingdom from 1963 to 1964

The Right Honourable The Lord Home of the Hirsel KT PC JP DL
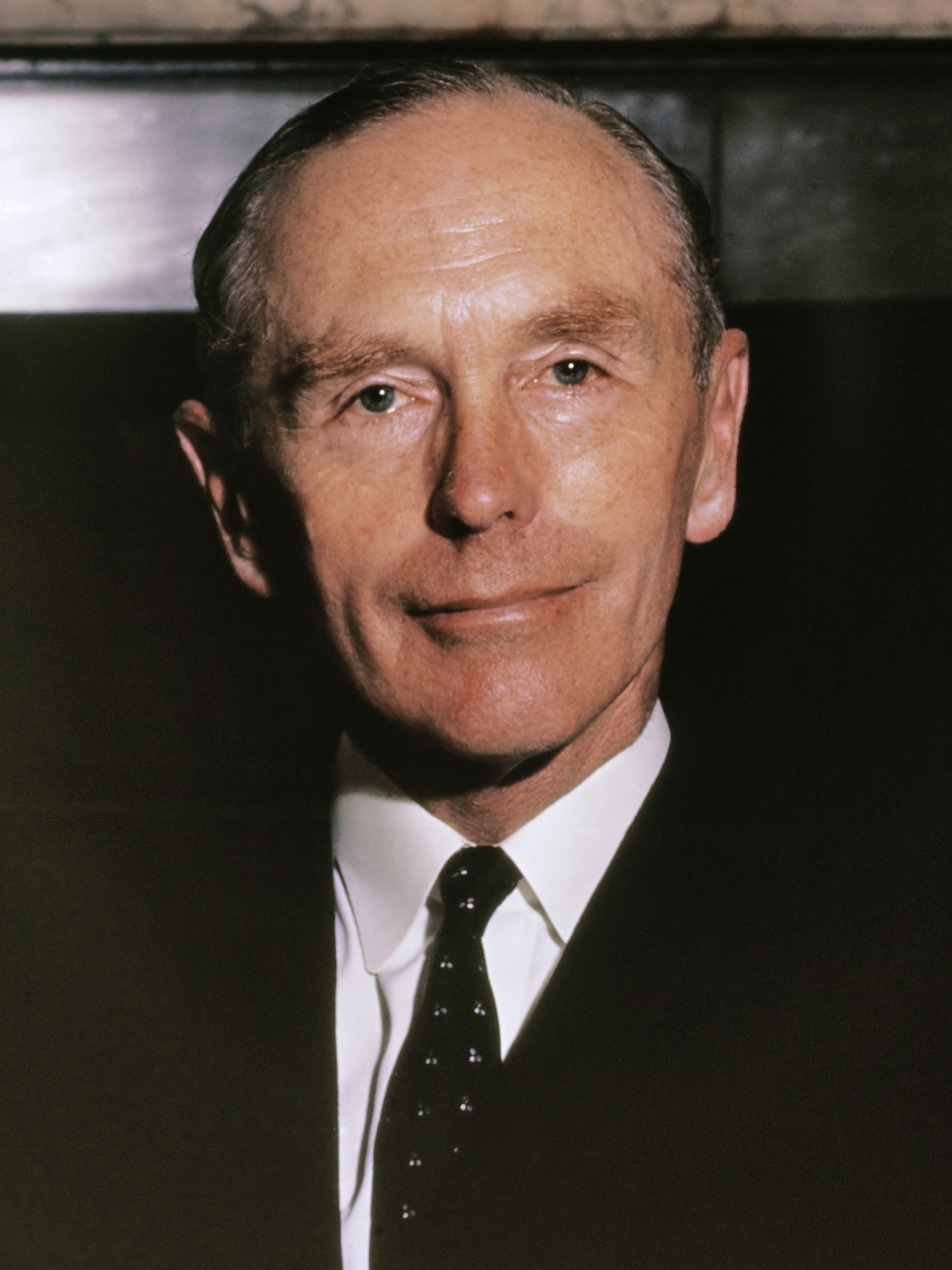
- Portrait, c. 1963

Prime Minister of the United Kingdom
- In office 19 October 1963 – 16 October 1964
- Monarch: Elizabeth II
- Preceded by: Harold Macmillan
- Succeeded by: Harold Wilson
Senior political offices
Leader of the Opposition
In office 16 October 1964 – 28 July 1965
Monarch	Elizabeth II
Prime Minister	Harold Wilson
Preceded by	Harold Wilson
Succeeded by	Edward Heath
Leader of the Conservative Party
In office 18 October 1963 – 28 July 1965
Preceded by	Harold Macmillan
Succeeded by	Edward Heath
Ministerial offices
Secretary of State for Foreign and Commonwealth Affairs (Note: Foreign Affairs (1960–1963))
In office 20 June 1970 – 4 March 1974
Prime Minister	Edward Heath
Preceded by	Michael Stewart
Succeeded by	James Callaghan
In office 27 July 1960 – 18 October 1963
Prime Minister	Harold Macmillan
Preceded by	Selwyn Lloyd
Succeeded by	Rab Butler
Lord President of the Council
In office 14 October 1959 – 27 July 1960
Prime Minister	Harold Macmillan
Preceded by	The Viscount Hailsham
Succeeded by	The Viscount Hailsham
In office 29 March 1957 – 17 September 1957
Prime Minister	Harold Macmillan
Preceded by	The Marquess of Salisbury
Succeeded by	The Viscount Hailsham
Leader of the House of Lords
In office 29 March 1957 – 27 July 1960
Prime Minister	Harold Macmillan
Preceded by	The Marquess of Salisbury
Succeeded by	The Viscount Hailsham
Secretary of State for Commonwealth Relations
In office 7 April 1955 – 27 July 1960
Prime Minister	Anthony Eden; Harold Macmillan
Preceded by	The Viscount Swinton
Succeeded by	Duncan Sandys
Minister of State for Scotland
In office 2 November 1951 – 7 April 1955
Prime Minister	Winston Churchill
Preceded by	Office established
Succeeded by	Thomas Galbraith
Parliamentary Under-Secretary of State for Foreign Affairs
In office 26 May 1945 – 26 July 1945 Serving with The Lord Lovat
Prime Minister	Winston Churchill
Preceded by	George Hall
Succeeded by	Hector McNeil
Parliamentary offices
Member of the House of Lords
Lord Temporal
Life peerage 24 December 1974 – 9 October 1995
Hereditary peerage 11 July 1951 – 23 October 1963
Preceded by	The 13th Earl of Home
Succeeded by	The 15th Earl of Home (1996)
Member of Parliament
In office 7 November 1963 – 20 September 1974
Preceded by	Gilmour Leburn
Succeeded by	Nicholas Fairbairn
Constituency	Kinross and Western Perthshire
In office 23 February 1950 – 11 July 1951
Preceded by	Tom Steele
Succeeded by	Patrick Maitland
Constituency	Lanark
In office 27 October 1931 – 15 June 1945
Preceded by	Thomas Dickson
Succeeded by	Tom Steele
Constituency	Lanark

Personal details
- Born: Alexander Frederick Douglas-Home; 2 July 1903 Mayfair, London, England
- Died: 9 October 1995 (aged 92) Coldstream, Berwickshire, Scotland
- Resting place: Lennel Churchyard, Coldstream
- Party: Conservative
- Other political affiliations: Unionist
- Spouse: Elizabeth Alington (m. 1936; died 1990)
- Children: 4, including David
- Parent: Charles Douglas-Home (father)
- Relatives: Robin and Charles Douglas-Home (nephews)
- Education: Christ Church, Oxford

Military service
- Branch/service: British Army
- Rank: Major
- Unit: Territorial Army
- Commands: Lanarkshire Yeomanry
- Cricket career

Cricket information
- Batting: Right-handed
- Bowling: Right-arm fast-medium

Domestic team information
- Years: Team
- 1924–1925: Middlesex
- 1926: Oxford University
- 1926/27: MCC

Career statistics
Competition	First-class
Matches	10
Runs scored	147
Batting average	16.33
100s/50s	0/0
Top score	37*
Balls bowled	688
Wickets	12
Bowling average	30.25
5 wickets in innings	0
10 wickets in match	0
Best bowling	3/43
Catches/stumpings	9/–
- Source: Cricinfo

Alexander Frederick Douglas-Home, Baron Home of the Hirsel (/ˈhjuːm/; 2 July 1903 – 9 October 1995), known as Lord Dunglass from 1918 to 1951 and the Earl of Home from 1951 to 1963, was a British politician who served as Prime Minister of the United Kingdom from 1963 to 1964 and Leader of the Conservative Party until 1965. He was the last prime minister to hold office while being a member of the House of Lords, before renouncing his peerage and taking up a seat in the House of Commons for the remainder of his premiership. His reputation, however, rests more on his seven years over two stints as Foreign Secretary than on his brief premiership.

Born to nobility in the Peerage of Scotland, Douglas-Home was educated at Eton and Oxford and entered the House of Commons in 1931. Within six years, he became a parliamentary aide to Prime Minister Neville Chamberlain, witnessing the government's efforts to maintain peace through appeasement before the Second World War. In 1940, he was diagnosed with spinal tuberculosis, which forced him to suspend his political activities for nearly two years. After recovering, he returned to politics, although he lost his parliamentary seat in the 1945 general election before regaining it in 1950. The following year, he succeeded to the earldom of Home upon the death of his father and consequently moved to the House of Lords. During the premierships of Winston Churchill, Anthony Eden, and Harold Macmillan, he held a number of senior offices, including Leader of the House of Lords and Foreign Secretary. As Foreign Secretary from 1960 to 1963, he supported the United States during the Cuban Missile Crisis and signed the Partial Nuclear Test Ban Treaty on behalf of the United Kingdom.

In October 1963, Macmillan took ill and resigned as prime minister. Unexpectedly, Home was chosen to succeed him. By then it was generally considered unacceptable for a prime minister to sit in the House of Lords; Home renounced his earldom and successfully stood for election to the House of Commons. Home's appointment was controversial, and two of Macmillan's cabinet ministers refused to take office under him. He was criticised by the opposition Labour Party as an aristocrat, out of touch with the problems of ordinary families, and he came over stiffly in television interviews, by contrast with the young, media-savvy Labour leader, Harold Wilson. Douglas-Home's premiership was the second briefest of the twentieth century, lasting two days short of a year. Among the legislation his government passed was the Resale Prices Act 1964, an anti-trust provision targeting mandatory price conditions manufacturers imposed on retailers.

Despite polls predicting when Home took power that the Conservative Party — in power since 1951, and damaged by a 1963 sex scandal involving Macmillan's war secretary John Profumo — was headed for landslide defeat, Labour won only a slender majority in the 1964 election. Nevertheless, Douglas-Home resigned the party leadership after instituting a new and less secretive method of choosing his successor, Edward Heath, who defeated Wilson at the next election. From 1970 to 1974 Douglas-Home served in Heath's cabinet as Secretary of State at the Foreign and Commonwealth Office, an expanded version of the post of Foreign Secretary which he had held a decade prior. Following the government's defeat in 1974, he returned to the House of Lords as a life peer, and retired from front-line politics. He died in 1995, aged 92.

== Early life and education ==
Alexander Frederick Douglas-Home was born on 2 July 1903 at 28 South Street in Mayfair, London, the first of seven children of Lord Dunglass (the eldest son of the 12th Earl of Home) and of his wife, the Lady Lilian Lambton (daughter of the 4th Earl of Durham). The boy's first name was customarily abbreviated to "Alec". Among the couple's younger children was the playwright William Douglas-Home.

In 1918 the 12th Earl of Home died; Dunglass succeeded him in the earldom, and the courtesy title passed to his son, Alec Douglas-Home, who was styled Lord Dunglass until 1951. The young Lord Dunglass was educated at Ludgrove School, followed by Eton College. At Eton his contemporaries included Cyril Connolly, who later described him as:

[A] votary of the esoteric Eton religion, the kind of graceful, tolerant, sleepy boy who is showered with favours and crowned with all the laurels, who is liked by the masters and admired by the boys without any apparent exertion on his part, without experiencing the ill-effects of success himself or arousing the pangs of envy in others. In the 18th century he would have become Prime Minister before he was 30. As it was, he appeared honourably ineligible for the struggle of life.

After Eton, Dunglass went to Christ Church, Oxford, where he graduated with a third-class honours BA degree in Modern History in 1925.

As a member of the Eton XI, 1921

Dunglass was a talented sportsman. In addition to representing Eton at fives, he was a capable cricketer at school, club and county level, and was unique among British prime ministers in having played first-class cricket. Coached by George Hirst, he became in Wisden's phrase "a useful member of the Eton XI" that included Percy Lawrie and Gubby Allen. Wisden observed, "In the rain-affected Eton-Harrow match of 1922 he scored 66, despite being hindered by a saturated outfield, and then took 4 for 37 with his medium-paced out-swingers". At first-class level he represented the Oxford University Cricket Club, Middlesex County Cricket Club and Marylebone Cricket Club (MCC). Between 1924 and 1927 he played ten first-class matches, scoring 147 runs at an average of 16.33 with a best score of 37 not out. As a bowler he took 12 wickets at an average of 30.25 with a best of 3 for 43. Three of his first-class games were internationals against Argentina on the MCC "representative" tour of South America in 1926–27.

Dunglass began serving in the Territorial Army in 1924 as a lieutenant in the Lanarkshire Yeomanry, and was promoted to captain in 1928.

== Member of Parliament (1931–1937) ==
=== Election to Parliament ===
The courtesy title Lord Dunglass did not carry with it membership of the House of Lords, and Dunglass was eligible to seek election to the House of Commons. Unlike many aristocratic families, the Douglas-Homes had little history of political service. Uniquely in the family the 11th earl, Dunglass's great-grandfather, had held government office, as Under-Secretary at the Foreign Office in Wellington's 1828–1830 government. Dunglass's father stood, reluctantly and unsuccessfully, for Parliament before succeeding to the earldom.

Dunglass had shown little interest in politics while at Eton or Oxford. He had not joined the Oxford Union as budding politicians usually did. However, as heir to the family estates he was doubtful about the prospect of life as a country gentleman: "I was always rather discontented with this role and felt it wasn't going to be enough." His biographer David Dutton believes that Dunglass became interested in politics because of the widespread unemployment and poverty in the Scottish lowlands where his family lived. Later in his career, when he had become prime minister, Dunglass (by then Sir Alec Douglas-Home) wrote in a memorandum: "I went into politics because I felt that it was a form of public service and that as nearly a generation of politicians had been cut down in the first war those who had anything to give in the way of leadership ought to do so". (Note: In the same 1963 memorandum, Home revealed more of his individual political philosophy, writing that whereas country people get "pretty close to true values", the rootless townspeople "need constant leadership. It is, however, they who have the votes..." He added: "A large part in my decision [to become PM] was the feeling that only by simple straightforward talk to the industrial masses (sic) could we hope to defeat the Socialists".) His political thinking was influenced by that of Noel Skelton, a member of the Unionist party (as the Conservatives were called in Scotland between 1912 and 1965). Skelton advocated "a property-owning democracy", based on share-options for workers and industrial democracy. Dunglass was not persuaded by the socialist ideal of public ownership. He shared Skelton's view that "what everybody owns nobody owns".

With Skelton's support, Dunglass secured the Unionist candidacy at Coatbridge for the 1929 general election. It was not a seat that the Unionists expected to win, and he lost to his Labour opponent with 9,210 votes to Labour's 16,879. It was, however, valuable experience for Dunglass, who was of a gentle and uncombative disposition and not a natural orator; he began to learn how to deal with hostile audiences and get his message across. When a coalition "National Government" was formed in 1931 to deal with a financial crisis, Dunglass was adopted as the pro-coalition Unionist candidate for Lanark. The electorate of the area was mixed, and the constituency was not seen as a safe seat for any party; at the 1929 election Labour had captured it from the Unionists. However, with the pro-coalition Liberal party supporting him instead of fielding their own candidate, Dunglass easily beat the Labour candidate.

=== House of Commons ===
Membership of the new House of Commons was overwhelmingly made up of pro-coalition MPs, and there was therefore a large number of eligible members for the government posts to be filled. In Dutton's phrase, "it would have been easy for Dunglass to have languished indefinitely in backbench obscurity." However, Skelton, appointed as Under-secretary at the Scottish Office, offered Dunglass the unpaid post of unofficial parliamentary aide. This was doubly advantageous to Dunglass. Any MP appointed as official Parliamentary Private Secretary (PPS) to a government minister was privy to the inner workings of government but was expected to maintain a discreet silence in the House of Commons. Dunglass achieved the first without having to observe the second. He made his maiden speech in February 1932 on the subject of economic policy, advocating a cautiously protectionist approach to cheap imports. He countered Labour's objection that this would raise the cost of living, arguing that a tariff "stimulates employment and gives work [and] increases the purchasing power of the people by substituting wages for unemployment benefit."

During four years as Skelton's aide Dunglass was part of a team working on a wide range of issues, from medical services in rural Scotland to land settlements, fisheries, education, and industry. Dunglass was appointed official PPS to Anthony Muirhead, junior minister at the Ministry of Labour, in 1935, and less than a year later became PPS to the Chancellor of the Exchequer, Neville Chamberlain.

== Wartime career (1937–1945) ==
=== Chamberlain and war ===
By the time of Dunglass's appointment, Chamberlain was generally seen as the heir to the premiership, and in 1937 the incumbent, Stanley Baldwin, retired, and Chamberlain succeeded him. He retained Dunglass as his PPS, a role described by the biographer D. R. Thorpe as "the right-hand man ... the eyes and ears of Neville Chamberlain", and by Dutton as "liaison officer with the Parliamentary party, transmitting and receiving information and [keeping] his master informed of the mood on the government's back benches." This was particularly important for Chamberlain, who was often seen as distant and aloof; Douglas Hurd wrote that he "lacked the personal charm which makes competent administration palatable to wayward colleagues – a gift which his parliamentary private secretary possessed in abundance." Dunglass admired Chamberlain, despite his daunting personality: "I liked him, and I think he liked me. But if one went in at the end of the day for a chat or a gossip, he would be inclined to ask 'What do you want?' He was a very difficult man to get to know."

As Chamberlain's aide, Dunglass witnessed at first-hand the Prime Minister's attempts to prevent a second world war through appeasement of Adolf Hitler's Germany. When Chamberlain had his final meeting with Hitler at Munich in September 1938, Dunglass accompanied him. Having gained a short-lived extension of peace by acceding to Hitler's territorial demands at the expense of Czechoslovakia, Chamberlain was welcomed back to London by cheering crowds. Ignoring Dunglass's urging, he made an uncharacteristically grandiloquent speech, claiming to have brought back "Peace with Honour" and promising "peace for our time". These words were to haunt him when Hitler's continued aggression made war unavoidable less than a year later. Chamberlain remained prime minister from the outbreak of war in September 1939 until May 1940, when, in Dunglass's words, "he could no longer command support of a majority in the Conservative party". After a vote in the Commons, in which the government's majority fell from more than 200 to 81, Chamberlain made way for Winston Churchill. He accepted the non-departmental post of Lord President of the Council in the new coalition government; Dunglass remained as his PPS, having earlier declined the offer of a ministerial post as Under-secretary at the Scottish Office. Although Chamberlain's reputation never recovered from Munich, and his supporters such as R. A. Butler suffered throughout their later careers from the "appeasement" tag, Dunglass largely escaped blame. (Note: In a 1964 study of Douglas-Home John Dickie comments that Dunglass as a PPS lacked influence in decision making, and that such opprobrium as later attached to him was "guilt by association". Thorpe in his biography of Harold Macmillan writes that Butler's career was blighted by his support for the Munich agreement as a Foreign Office minister, but that "'Munich' was never held against Alec Douglas-Home".) Nevertheless, Dunglass firmly maintained all his life that the Munich agreement had been vital to the survival of Britain and the defeat of Nazi Germany by giving the UK an extra year to prepare for a war that it could not have contested in 1938. Within months of his leaving the premiership, Chamberlain's health began to fail; he resigned from the cabinet, and died after a short illness in November 1940.

=== Military service and backbench MP ===
Dunglass had volunteered for active military service, seeking to rejoin the Lanarkshire Yeomanry shortly after Chamberlain left Downing Street. The consequent medical examination revealed that Dunglass had a hole in his spine surrounded by tuberculosis in the bone. Without surgery he would have been unable to walk within a matter of months. An innovative and hazardous operation was performed in September 1940, lasting six hours, in which the diseased bone in the spine was scraped away and replaced with healthy bone from the patient's shin.

You have put backbone into a politician!

— Dunglass to his surgeon

For all of Dunglass's humour and patience, the following two years were a grave trial. He was encased in plaster and kept flat on his back for most of that period. Although buoyed up by the sensitive support of his wife and family, as he later confessed, "I often felt that I would be better dead". Towards the end of 1942 he was released from his plaster jacket and fitted with a spinal brace, and in early 1943 he was mobile for the first time since the operation. During his incapacity he read voraciously; among the works he studied were Das Kapital, (Note: According to Thorpe, Douglas-Home was the only British Prime Minister known to have read the work.) and works by Engels and Lenin, biographies of nineteenth and twentieth century politicians, and novels by authors from Dostoyevsky to Koestler.

In July 1943 Dunglass attended the House of Commons for the first time since 1940, and began to make a reputation as a backbench member, particularly for his expertise in the field of foreign affairs. He foresaw a post-imperial future for Britain and emphasised the need for strong European ties after the war. In 1944, with the war now turning in the Allies' favour, Dunglass spoke eloquently about the importance of resisting the Soviet Union's ambition to dominate eastern Europe. His boldness in publicly urging Churchill not to give in to Joseph Stalin was widely remarked upon; many, including Churchill himself, observed that some of those once associated with appeasement were determined that it should not be repeated in the face of Russian aggression. Labour left the wartime coalition in May 1945 and Churchill formed a caretaker Conservative government, pending a general election in July. Dunglass was appointed to his first ministerial post: Anthony Eden remained in charge of the Foreign Office, and Dunglass was appointed as one of his two Under-secretaries of State.

In the general election in July 1945, the caretaker government was heavily defeated by Labour and Churchill resigned. Dunglass lost his seat in Lanark to Labour's Tom Steele by 1,884 votes and he was out of Parliament for five years.

== Postwar career (1950–1960) ==
=== Re-election to Parliament and peerage ===
In 1950, Clement Attlee, the Labour prime minister, called a general election. Dunglass was invited to stand once again as Unionist candidate for Lanark. Having been disgusted at personal attacks during the 1945 campaign by Tom Steele, his Labour opponent, Dunglass did not scruple to remind the voters of Lanark that Steele had warmly thanked the Communist Party and its members for helping him take the seat from the Unionists. By 1950, with the Cold War at its height, Steele's association with the communists was a crucial electoral liability. Dunglass regained the seat with one of the smallest majorities in any British constituency: 19,890 to Labour's 19,205. Labour narrowly won the general election, with a majority of five.

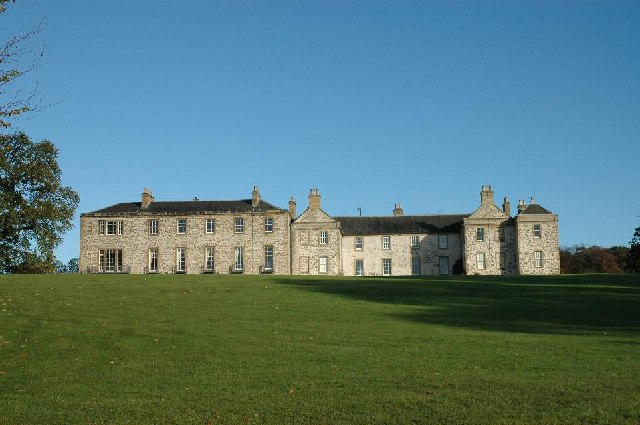
The Hirsel, the Douglas-Home family's principal residence

In July 1951 the 13th earl died. Dunglass succeeded him, inheriting the title of Earl of Home together with the extensive family estates, including The Hirsel, the Douglas-Homes' principal residence. The new Lord Home took his seat in the Lords; a by-election was called to appoint a new MP for Lanark, but it was still pending when Attlee called another general election in October 1951. (Note: Labour's majority of five seats was not thought large enough to sustain the party through a full five-year term in office. George VI was due to be absent for six months on a Commonwealth tour, and Attlee agreed that it was necessary that the King should leave behind a stable government not likely to fall in his absence. Attlee called a further election in October 1951 at a time not advantageous to his party, which was lagging behind the Conservatives in opinion polls. Labour polled more votes than the Conservatives at the election, but the British first-past-the-post electoral system nevertheless gave more seats to the Conservatives. The King's tour did not take place because of his poor health.) The Unionists held Lanark, and the national result gave the Conservatives under Churchill a small but working majority of seventeen.

=== Minister for Scotland ===
Home was appointed to the new post of Minister of State at the Scottish Office, a middle-ranking position, senior to Under-secretary but junior to James Stuart, the Secretary of State, who was a member of the cabinet. Stuart, previously an influential chief whip, was a confidant of Churchill, and possibly the most powerful Scottish Secretary in any government. Thorpe writes that Home owed his appointment to Stuart's advocacy rather than to any great enthusiasm on the Prime Minister's part (Churchill referred to him as "Home sweet Home"). In addition to his ministerial position Home was appointed to membership of the Privy Council (PC), an honour granted only selectively to ministers below cabinet rank.

The royal cypher – a problem for Home and the Scottish Office

Throughout Churchill's second term as prime minister (1951–1955) Home remained at the Scottish Office, although both Eden at the Foreign Office and Lord Salisbury at the Commonwealth Relations Office invited him to join their ministerial teams. Among the Scottish matters with which he dealt were hydro-electric projects, hill farming, sea transport, road transport, forestry, and the welfare of crofters in the Highlands and the Western Isles. These matters went largely unreported in the British press, but the question of the royal cypher on Post Office pillar boxes became front-page news. Because Elizabeth I of England was never queen of Scotland, some nationalists maintained when Elizabeth II came to the British throne in 1952 that in Scotland she should be styled "Elizabeth I". Churchill said in the House of Commons that considering the "greatness and splendour of Scotland", and the contribution of the Scots to British and world history, "they ought to keep their silliest people in order". Home nevertheless arranged that in Scotland new pillar boxes were decorated with the royal crown instead of the full cypher.

=== Secretary of State for Commonwealth Affairs ===
==== Eden government: 1955–1957 ====
When Eden succeeded Churchill as prime minister in 1955 he promoted Home to the cabinet as Secretary of State for Commonwealth Relations. At the time of this appointment Home had not been to any of the countries within his ministerial remit, and he quickly arranged to visit Australia, New Zealand, Singapore, India, Pakistan and Ceylon. He had to deal with the sensitive subject of immigration from and between Commonwealth countries, where a delicate balance had to be struck between resistance in some quarters in Britain and Australia to non-white immigration on the one hand, and on the other the danger of sanctions in India and Pakistan against British commercial interests if discriminatory policies were pursued. In most respects, when Home took up the appointment it seemed to be a relatively uneventful period in the history of the Commonwealth. The upheaval of Indian independence in 1947 was well in the past, and the wave of decolonising of the 1960s was yet to come. However, it fell to Home to maintain Commonwealth unity during the Suez Crisis in 1956, described by Dutton as "the most divisive in its history to date". Australia, New Zealand and South Africa backed the Anglo-French invasion of Egypt to regain control of the Suez Canal. Canada, Ceylon, India and Pakistan opposed it.

There appeared to be a real danger that Ceylon, India and, particularly, Pakistan might leave the Commonwealth. Home was firm in his support of the invasion, but used his contacts with Jawaharlal Nehru, V. K. Krishna Menon, Nan Pandit and others to try to prevent the Commonwealth from breaking up. His relationship with Eden was supportive and relaxed; he felt able, as others did not, to warn Eden of unease about Suez both internationally and among some members of the cabinet. Eden dismissed the latter as the "weak sisters"; the most prominent was Butler, whose perceived hesitancy over Suez on top of his support for appeasement of Hitler damaged his standing within the Conservative party. When the invasion was abandoned under pressure from the US in November 1956, Home worked with the dissenting members of the Commonwealth to build the organisation into what Hurd calls "a modern multiracial Commonwealth" (notwithstanding the Commonwealth was already multiracial.)

==== Macmillan's government: 1957–1960 ====
Eden resigned in January 1957. In 1955 he had been the obvious successor to Churchill, but this time there was no clear heir apparent. Leaders of the Conservative party were not elected by ballot of MPs or party members, but emerged after informal soundings within the party, known as "the customary processes of consultation". The chief whip, Edward Heath, canvassed the views of backbench Conservative MPs, and two senior Conservative peers, the Lord President of the Council, Lord Salisbury, and the Lord Chancellor, Lord Kilmuir, saw members of the cabinet individually to ascertain their preferences. Only one cabinet colleague supported Butler; the rest, including Home, opted for Macmillan. Churchill, whom the Queen consulted, did the same. Macmillan was appointed prime minister on 10 January 1957.

In the new government Home remained at the Commonwealth Relations Office. Much of his time was spent on matters relating to Africa, where the futures of Bechuanaland and the Central African Federation needed to be agreed. Among other matters in which he was involved were the dispute between India and Pakistan over Kashmir, assisted emigration from Britain to Australia, and relations with Archbishop Makarios of Cyprus. The last unexpectedly led to an enhanced cabinet role for Home. Makarios, leader of the militant anti-British and pro-Greek movement, was detained in exile in the Seychelles. Macmillan, with the agreement of Home and most of the cabinet, decided that this imprisonment was doing more harm than good to Britain's position in Cyprus, and ordered Makarios's release. Lord Salisbury strongly dissented from the decision and resigned from the cabinet in March 1957. Macmillan added Salisbury's responsibilities to Home's existing duties, making him Lord President of the Council and Leader of the House of Lords. The first of these posts was largely honorific, but the leadership of the Lords put Home in charge of getting the government's business through the upper house, and brought him nearer to the centre of power. In Hurd's phrase, "By the imperceptible process characteristic of British politics he found himself month by month, without any particular manoeuvre on his part, becoming an indispensable figure in the government."

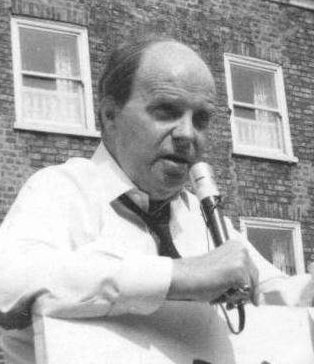
Iain Macleod, who had a difficult relationship with Home

Home was generally warmly regarded by colleagues and opponents alike, and there were few politicians who did not respond well to him. One was Attlee, but as their political primes did not overlap this was of minor consequence. More important was Iain Macleod's prickly relationship with Home. Macleod, Secretary of State for the Colonies from 1959 to 1961, was, like Butler, on the liberal wing of the Conservative party; he was convinced, as Home was not, that Britain's colonies in Africa should have majority rule and independence as quickly as possible. Their spheres of influence overlapped in the Central African Federation. (Note: The federation consisted of Northern Rhodesia, Southern Rhodesia and Nyasaland. The first and third were still colonies and came under Macleod's purview; Southern Rhodesia, which had self-government, was the responsibility of Home's department.)

Macleod wished to push ahead with majority rule and independence; Home believed in a more gradual approach to independence, accommodating both white minority and black majority opinions and interests. Macleod disagreed with those who warned that precipitating independence would lead the newly independent nations into "trouble, strife, poverty, dictatorship" and other evils. His reply was, "Would you want the Romans to have stayed on in Britain?" He threatened to resign unless he was allowed to release the leading Nyasaland activist Hastings Banda from prison, a move that Home and others thought unwise and liable to provoke distrust of Britain among the white minority in the federation. Macleod had his way, but by that time Home was no longer at the Commonwealth Relations Office.

== Foreign Secretary (1960–1963) ==
=== Appointment ===
In 1960 the Chancellor of the Exchequer, Derick Heathcoat-Amory, insisted on retiring. Macmillan agreed with Heathcoat-Amory that the best successor at the Treasury would be the current Foreign Secretary, Selwyn Lloyd. In terms of ability and experience the obvious candidate to take over from Lloyd at the Foreign Office was Home, but by 1960 there was an expectation that the Foreign Secretary would be a member of the House of Commons. The post had not been held by a peer since Lord Halifax in 1938–1940; Eden had wished to appoint Salisbury in 1955, but concluded that it would be unacceptable to the Commons.

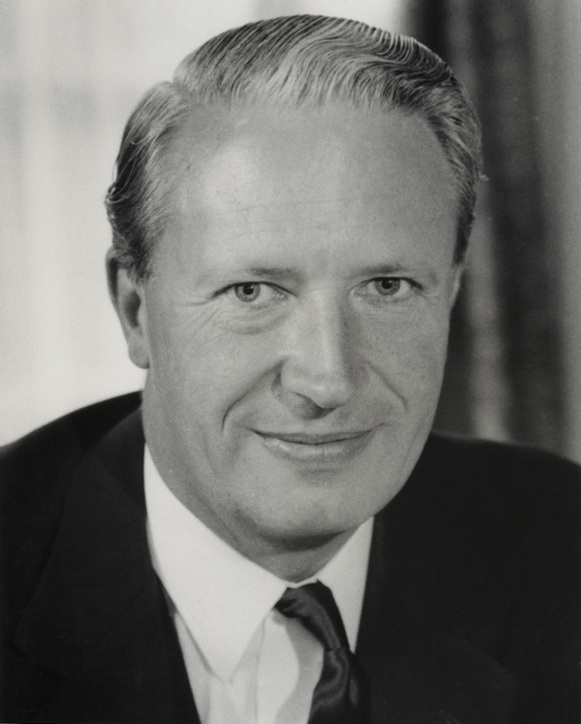
Edward Heath, Home's deputy at the Foreign Office. They later served in each other's cabinets.

After discussions with Lloyd and senior civil servants, Macmillan took the unprecedented step of appointing two Foreign Office cabinet ministers: Home, as Foreign Secretary, in the Lords, and Edward Heath, as Lord Privy Seal and deputy Foreign Secretary, in the Commons. With British application for admission to the European Economic Community (EEC) pending, Heath was given particular responsibility for the EEC negotiations as well as for speaking in the Commons on foreign affairs in general.

==== Objection at appointment ====
The opposition Labour party protested at Home's appointment; its leader, Hugh Gaitskell, said that it was "constitutionally objectionable" for a peer to be in charge of the Foreign Office. Macmillan responded that an accident of birth should not be allowed to deny him the services of "the best man for the job – the man I want at my side". Hurd comments, "Like all such artificial commotions it died down after a time (and indeed was not renewed with any strength nineteen years later when Margaret Thatcher appointed another peer, Lord Carrington, to the same post)". The Home–Heath partnership worked well. Despite their different backgrounds and ages – Home an Edwardian aristocrat and Heath a lower-middle class meritocrat raised in the inter-war years – the two men respected and liked one another. Home supported Macmillan's ambition to get Britain into the EEC, and was happy to leave the negotiations in Heath's hands.

=== Cold War ===
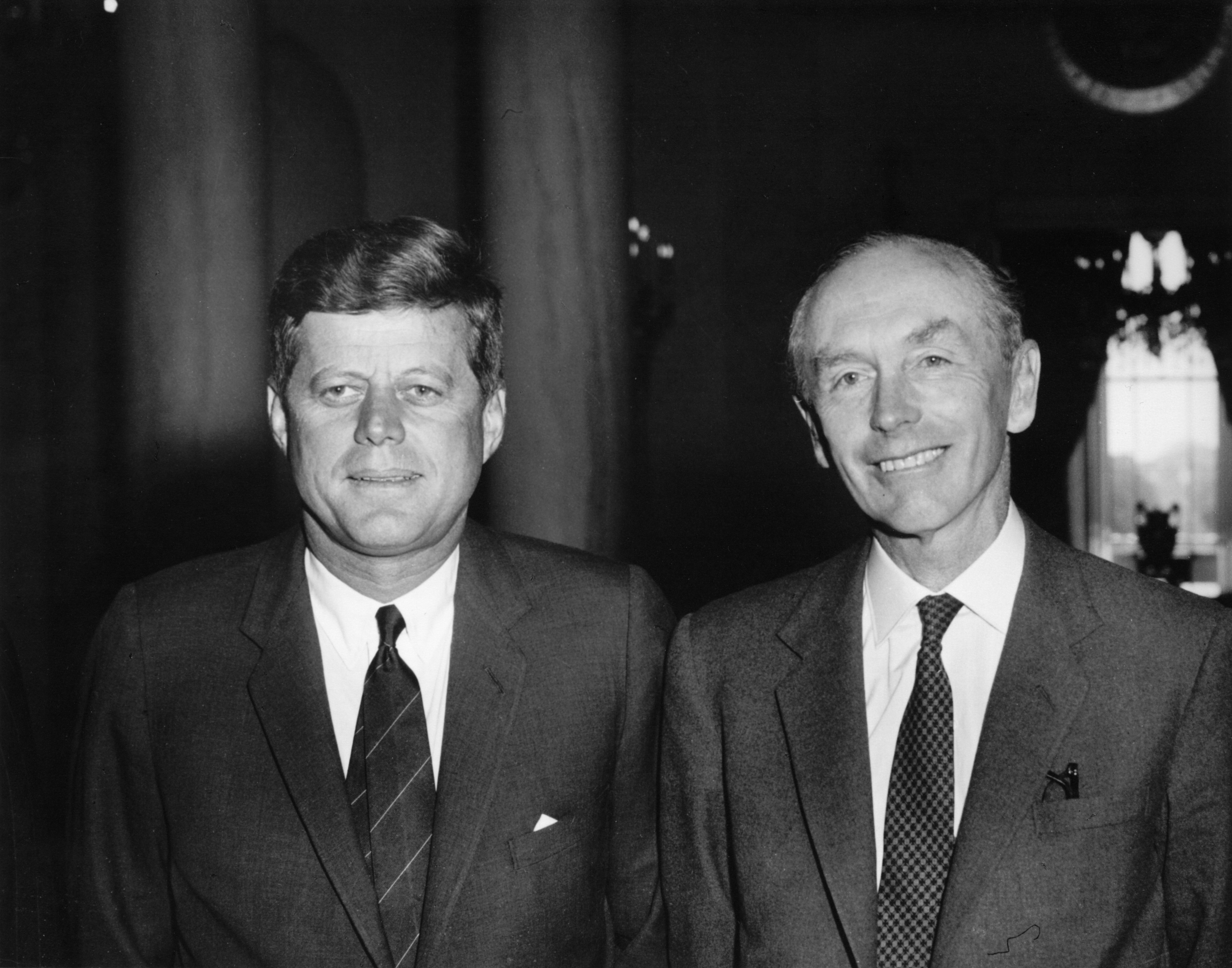
Douglas-Home with John F. Kennedy at the White House, 30 September 1962.

Home's attention was mainly concentrated on the Cold War, where his forcefully expressed anti-communist beliefs were tempered by a pragmatic approach to dealing with the Soviet Union. His first major problem in this sphere was in 1961 when on the orders of the Soviet leader, Nikita Khrushchev, the Berlin Wall was erected to stop East Germans escaping to West Germany via West Berlin. Home wrote to his American counterpart, Dean Rusk, "The prevention of East Berliners getting into West Berlin has never been a casus belli for us. We are concerned with Western access to Berlin and that is what we must maintain." The governments of West Germany, Britain and the US quickly reached agreement on their joint negotiating position; it remained to persuade President de Gaulle of France to align himself with the allies. During their discussions Macmillan commented that de Gaulle showed "all the rigidity of a poker without its occasional warmth." An agreement was reached, and the allies tacitly recognised that the wall was going to remain in place. The Soviets for their part did not seek to cut off allied access to West Berlin through East German territory.

The following year the Cuban Missile Crisis threatened to turn the Cold War into a nuclear one. Soviet nuclear missiles were brought to Cuba, provocatively close to the US. The American president, John F Kennedy, insisted that they must be removed, and many thought that the world was on the brink of catastrophe with nuclear exchanges between the two super-powers. Despite a public image of unflappable calm, Macmillan was by nature nervous and highly strung. During the missile crisis, Home, whose calm was genuine and innate, strengthened the Prime Minister's resolve, and encouraged him to back up Kennedy's defiance of Soviet threats of nuclear attack. The Lord Chancellor (Lord Dilhorne), the Attorney General (Sir John Hobson) and the Solicitor General, (Sir Peter Rawlinson) privately gave Home their opinion that the American blockade of Cuba was a breach of international law, (Note: The legality of US actions in the crisis, including the blockade of Cuba, has subsequently been questioned by American writers specialising in law, including Abram Chayes in The Cuban Missile Crisis: International Crises and the Role of Law, and Stephen R Shalom in International Lawyers and Other Apologists: The Case of the Cuban Missile Crisis. The former concludes that American actions were not in breach of international law; the latter takes the contrary view.) but he continued to advocate a policy of strong support for Kennedy. When Khrushchev backed down and removed the Soviet missiles from Cuba, Home commented:

There has been a good deal of speculation about Russia's motives. To me they are quite clear. Their motive was to test the will of the United States and to see how the President of the United States, in particular, would react against a threat of force. If the President had failed for one moment in a matter which affected the security of the United States, no ally of America would have had confidence in United States protection ever again.

=== Nuclear Test Ban Treaty ===
The principal landmark of Home's term as Foreign Secretary was also in the sphere of east–west relations: the negotiation and signature of the Partial Nuclear Test Ban Treaty in 1963. He got on well with his American and Soviet counterparts, Rusk and Andrei Gromyko. The latter wrote that whenever he met Home there were "no sudden, still less brilliant, breakthroughs" but "each meeting left a civilised impression that made the next meeting easier." Gromyko concluded that Home added sharpness to British foreign policy. Gromyko, Home and Rusk signed the treaty in Moscow on 5 August 1963. After the fear provoked internationally by the Cuban Missile Crisis, the ban on nuclear testing in the atmosphere, in outer space and under water was widely welcomed as a step towards ending the cold war. For the British government the good news from Moscow was doubly welcome for drawing attention away from the Profumo affair, a sexual scandal involving a senior minister, which had left Macmillan's government looking vulnerable.

=== Successor to Macmillan ===
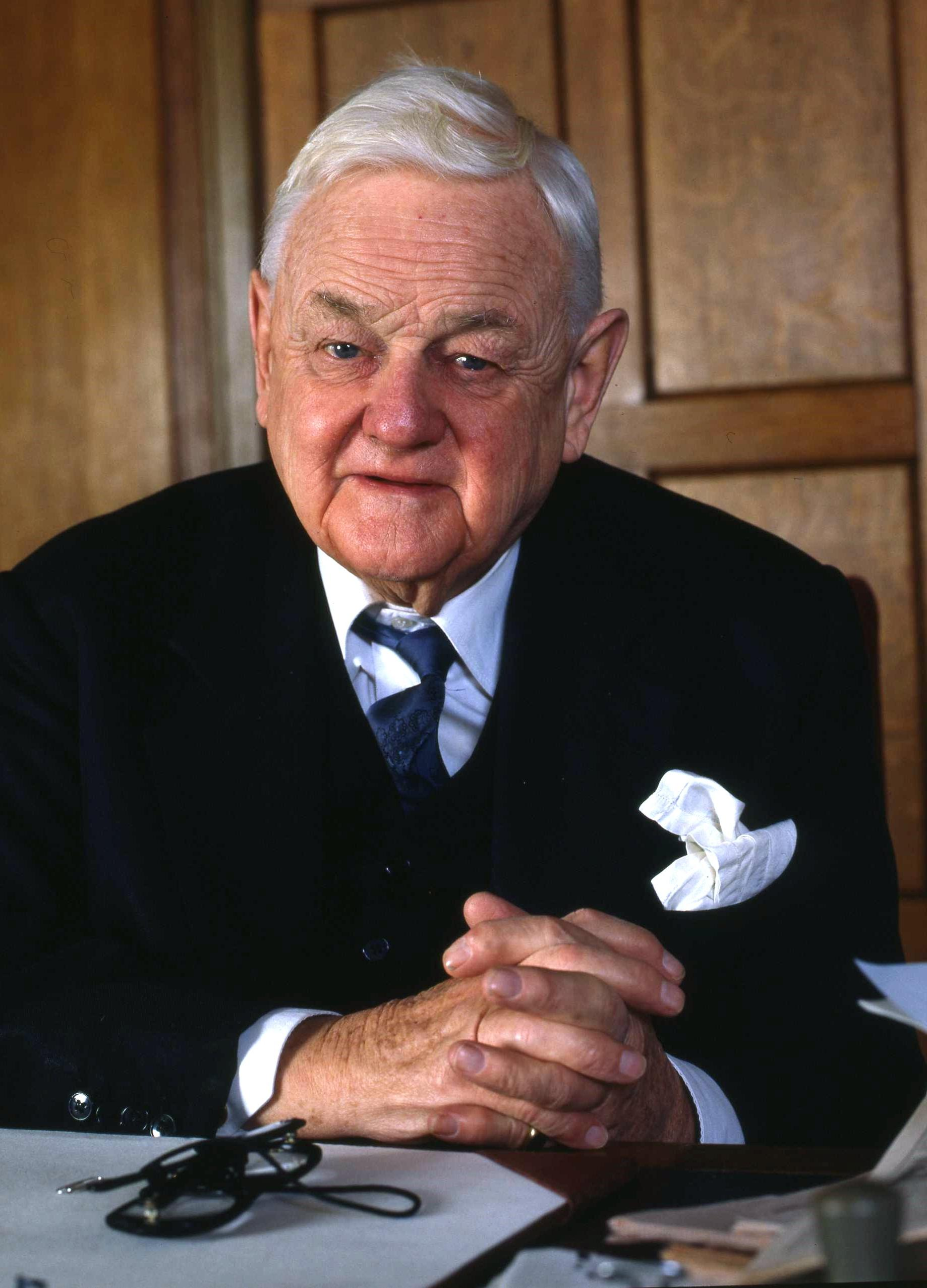
Lord Hailsham, Macmillan's original preference as successor

In October 1963, just before the Conservative party's annual conference, Macmillan was taken ill with a prostatic obstruction. The condition was at first thought more serious than it turned out to be, and he announced that he would resign as prime minister as soon as a successor was appointed. Three senior politicians were considered likely successors, Butler (First Secretary of State), Reginald Maudling (Chancellor of the Exchequer) and Lord Hailsham (Lord President of the Council and Leader of the House of Lords). The Times summed up their support:

Mr. Butler can no doubt be sure of a majority inside the Cabinet, where the main initiative must now be taken. Mr. Maudling, when Parliament dispersed at the beginning of August, could have commanded a majority among backbenchers in the Commons. Lord Hailsham, as his reception showed today on his first appearance before the conference, continues to be the darling of the constituency associations.

In the same article, Home was mentioned in passing as "a fourth hypothetical candidate" on whom the party could compromise if necessary.

It was assumed in the Times article, and by other commentators, that if Hailsham (or Home) was a candidate he would have to renounce his peerage. This had been made possible for the first time by recent legislation. (Note: If Macmillan had resigned a year earlier or a year later, neither Hailsham nor Home could have been candidates for the succession. The Peerage Act became law in 1963 after a three-year campaign by Anthony Wedgwood Benn, who had unwillingly inherited his father's peerage in 1960. Under this law existing peers had twelve months from 31 July 1963 in which they could disclaim their peerages.) The last British prime minister to sit in the House of Lords was the third Marquess of Salisbury in 1902. By 1923, having to choose between Baldwin and Lord Curzon, George V decided that "the requirements of the present times" obliged him to appoint a prime minister from the Commons. His private secretary recorded that the King "believed he would not be fulfilling his trust were he now to make his selection of Prime Minister from the House of Lords". Similarly, after the resignation of Neville Chamberlain in 1940 there were two likely successors, Churchill and Halifax, but the latter ruled himself out for the premiership on the grounds that his membership of the House of Lords disqualified him. In 1963, therefore, it was well established that the Prime Minister should be a member of the House of Commons. On 10 October Hailsham announced his intention to renounce his viscountcy.

The "customary processes" once again took place. The usual privacy of the consultations was made impossible because they took place during the party conference, and the potential successors made their bids very publicly. Butler had the advantage of giving the party leader's keynote address to the conference in Macmillan's absence, but was widely thought to have wasted the opportunity by delivering an uninspiring speech. Hailsham put off many potential backers by his extrovert, and some thought vulgar, campaigning. Maudling, like Butler, made a speech that failed to impress the conference. Senior Conservative figures such as Lord Woolton and Selwyn Lloyd urged Home to make himself available for consideration.

Having ruled himself out of the race when the news of Macmillan's illness broke, Home angered at least two of his cabinet colleagues by changing his mind. Macmillan quickly came to the view that Home would be the best choice as his successor, and gave him valuable behind-the-scenes backing. He let it be known that if he recovered he would be willing to serve as a member of a Home cabinet. He had earlier favoured Hailsham, but changed his mind when he learned from Lord Harlech, the British ambassador to the US, that the Kennedy administration was uneasy at the prospect of Hailsham as prime minister, and from his chief whip that Hailsham, seen as a right-winger, would alienate moderate voters.

Butler, by contrast, was seen as on the liberal wing of the Conservatives, and his election as leader might split the party. The Lord Chancellor, Lord Dilhorne, conducted a poll of cabinet members, and reported to Macmillan that taking account of first and second preferences there were ten votes for Home, four for Maudling, three for Butler and two for Hailsham. (Note: In 1980 a biographer of Macmillan, George Hutchinson, expressed strong doubt about the reliability of Dilhorne's figures.)

The appointment of a prime minister is part of the royal prerogative, on which the monarch has no constitutional duty to consult an outgoing prime minister. Nevertheless, Macmillan advised the Queen that he considered Home the right choice. Little of this was known beyond the senior ranks of the party and the royal secretariat. On 18 October The Times ran the headline, "The Queen May Send for Mr. Butler Today". The Daily Telegraph and The Financial Times also predicted that Butler was about to be appointed. The Queen sent for Home the same day. Aware of the divisions within the governing party, she did not appoint him prime minister, but invited him to see whether he was able to form a government.

Home's cabinet colleagues Enoch Powell and Iain Macleod, who disapproved of his candidacy, made a last-minute effort to prevent him from taking office by trying to persuade Butler and the other candidates not to take posts in a Home cabinet. Butler, however, believed it to be his duty to serve in the cabinet; he refused to have any part in the conspiracy, and accepted the post of Foreign Secretary. The other candidates followed Butler's lead and only Powell and Macleod held out and refused office under Home. Macleod commented, "One does not expect to have many people with one in the last ditch". On 19 October Home was able to return to Buckingham Palace to kiss hands as prime minister. The press was not only wrong-footed by the appointment, but generally highly critical. The pro-Labour Daily Mirror said on its front page:

A nice chap and a polite peer. But Caligula's appointment of his horse as a consul was an act of prudent statesmanship compared with this gesture of sickbed levity by Mr. Macmillan. ... Alec (not Smart Alec – just Alec) is playing chess with a Cabinet containing at least four members of greater stature, brain-power, personality and potential than himself. Butler has been betrayed, Maudling insulted, Macleod ignored, Heath treated with contempt, and Hailsham giggled out of court by the jester in hospital.

The Times, generally pro-Conservative, had backed Butler, and called it "prodigal" of the party to pass over his many talents. The paper praised Home as "an outstandingly successful Foreign Secretary", but doubted his grasp of domestic affairs, his modernising instincts and his suitability "to carry the Conservative Party through a fierce and probably dirty campaign" at the general election due within a year. The Guardian, liberal in its political outlook, remarked that Home "does not look like the man to impart force and purpose to his Cabinet and the country" and suggested that he seemed too frail politically to be even a stop-gap. The Observer, another liberal-minded paper, said, "The overwhelming – and damaging – impression left by the events of the last two weeks is that the Tories have been forced to settle for a second-best. ... The calmness and steadiness which made him a good Foreign Secretary, particularly at times of crisis like Berlin and Cuba, may also be a liability."

In January 1964, and in the absence of any other information, Macleod now editor of The Spectator, used the pretext of a review of a book by Randolph Churchill to publicise his own different and very detailed version of the leadership election. He described the "soundings" of five Tory grandees, four of whom, like Home and Macmillan had been to school at Eton, as a stitch up by an Etonian 'magic circle.' The article received wide publicity convincing Anthony Howard, who later declared himself "deeply affronted ...and never more affronted than when Alec Douglas-Home became leader of the Conservative Party."

== Prime Minister (1963–1964) ==
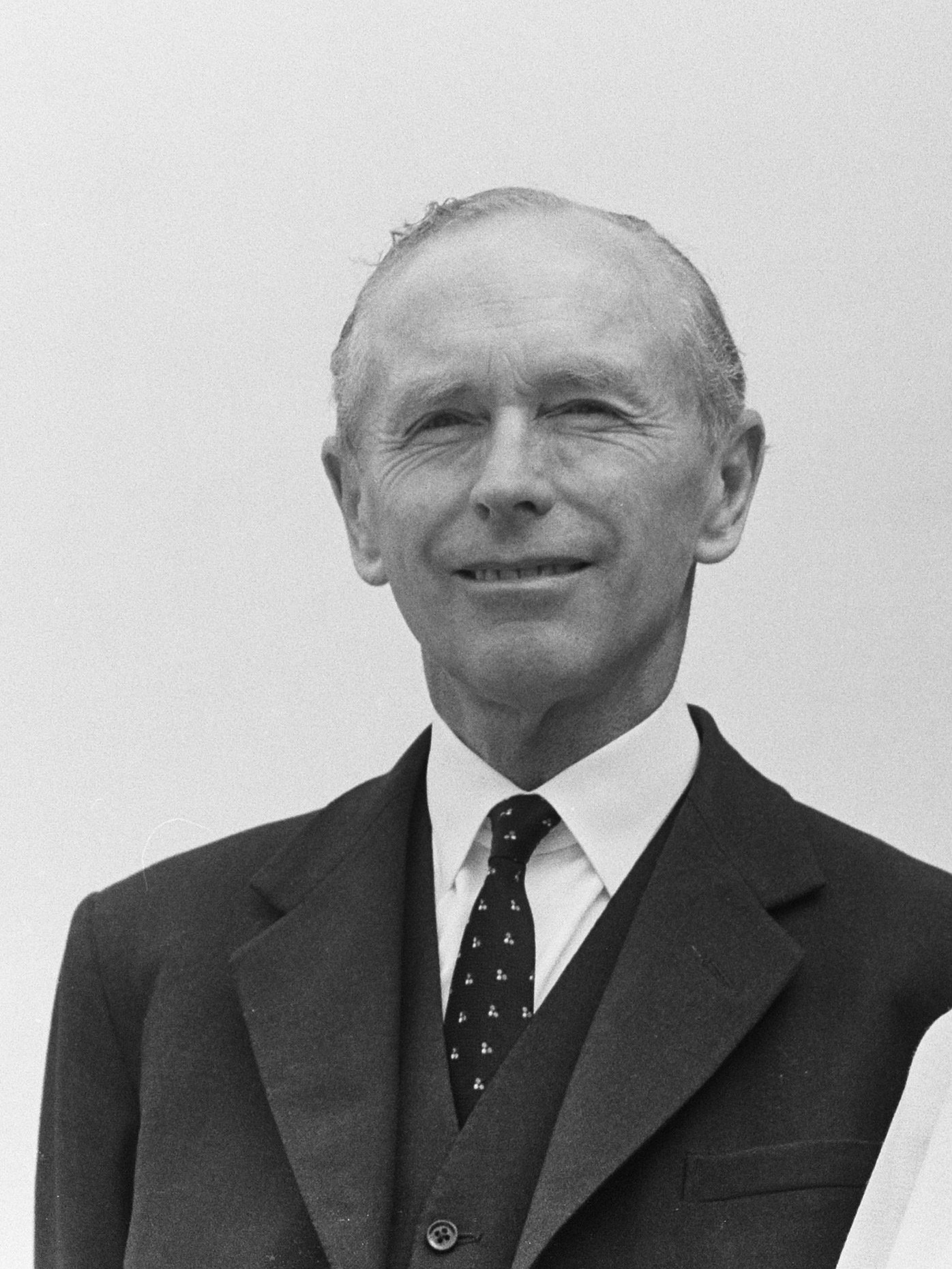
- Douglas-Home in 1963
- Premiership of Alec Douglas-Home; 19 October 1963 – 16 October 1964
- Monarch: Elizabeth II
- Cabinet: Douglas-Home ministry
- Party: Conservative
- Seat: 10 Downing Street
- Coat of arms of HM Government

On 23 October 1963, four days after becoming prime minister, Home disclaimed his earldom and associated lesser peerages. (Note: The subordinate titles were the lordship of Dunglass, the lordship of Home, the lordship of Hume of Berwick, the barony of Douglas and the barony of Hume of Berwick.) Having been made a Knight of the Order of the Thistle (KT) in 1962, he was known after stepping down from the Lords as Sir Alec Douglas-Home. The safe Unionist seat of Kinross and West Perthshire was vacant, and Douglas-Home was adopted as his party's candidate. Parliament was due to meet on 24 October after the summer recess, but its return was postponed until 12 November pending the by-election. For twenty days Douglas-Home was prime minister while a member of neither house of Parliament, a situation without modern precedent. (Note: Technically, no Prime Minister, or any other politician, is a Member of Parliament between the dissolution of one Parliament and the election of another, but Douglas-Home was singular in being a member of neither house while a current Parliament was still in being. Although there was no precedent in modern British Parliamentary history, there were analogous cases in at least one other Commonwealth legislature: Mackenzie King twice remained as Prime Minister of Canada having lost his seat, in 1925 and 1945, returning to the Canadian House of Commons in by-elections.) He won the by-election with a majority of 9,328; the Liberal candidate was in second place and Labour in third.

The Parliamentary leader of the opposition Labour party, Harold Wilson, attacked the new prime minister as "an elegant anachronism". He asserted that nobody from Douglas-Home's background knew of the problems of ordinary families. In particular, Wilson demanded to know how "a scion of an effete establishment" could lead the technological revolution that Wilson held to be necessary: "This is the counter-revolution ... After half a century of democratic advance, of social revolution, the whole process has ground to a halt with a fourteenth earl!" Douglas-Home dismissed this as populist anti-elitism, and observed, "I suppose Mr Wilson, when you come to think of it, is the fourteenth Mr Wilson." He called Wilson "this slick salesman of synthetic science" and the Labour party "the only relic of class consciousness in the country". The opposition retreated, with a statement in the press that "The Labour Party is not interested in the fact that the new Prime Minister inherited a fourteenth Earldom – he cannot help his antecedents any more than the rest of us."

Douglas-Home inherited from Macmillan a government widely perceived as in decline; Hurd wrote that it was "becalmed in a sea of satire and scandal." Douglas-Home was the target of satirists on BBC television and in Private Eye magazine. Private Eye persistently referred to him as "Baillie Vass", in allusion to a Scottish bailie. (Note: This running joke began in 1964 when a provincial newspaper, the Aberdeen Evening Express accidentally used a picture of Douglas-Home over a caption referring to a baillie called Vass. Private Eye then affected to believe that Douglas-Home was an impostor whom the newspaper had unmasked; the magazine maintained this fiction throughout the rest of Douglas-Home's premiership and thereafter. Private Eye extended the notion to include Douglas-Home's nephew, the journalist Charles Douglas-Home, whom it dubbed "Charles Vass".) Unlike Wilson, Douglas-Home was not at ease on television, and came across as less spontaneous than his opponent.

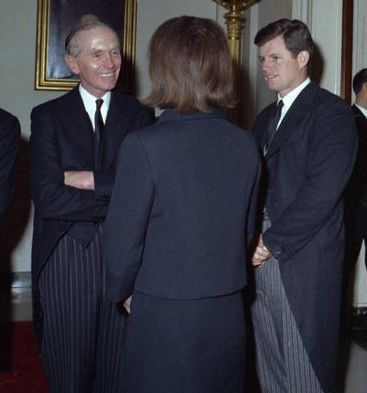
Douglas-Home with Jackie (centre, back to camera) and Ted Kennedy (right) at the post funeral reception for John F. Kennedy, 25 November 1963

In international affairs, the most dramatic event during Douglas-Home's premiership was the assassination of John F. Kennedy, which happened about a month after the start of his tenure. Douglas-Home broadcast a tribute on television. He had liked and worked well with Kennedy, and did not develop such a satisfactory relationship with Lyndon Johnson. Their governments had a serious disagreement on the question of British trade with Cuba. Under Douglas-Home the colonies of Northern Rhodesia and Nyasaland gained independence, though this was as a result of negotiations led by Macleod under the Macmillan government.

In Britain there was economic prosperity; exports "zoomed", according to The Times, and the economy was growing at an annual rate of four per cent. Douglas-Home made no pretence to economic expertise; he commented that his problems were of two sorts: "The political ones are insoluble and the economic ones are incomprehensible." On another occasion he said, "When I have to read economic documents I have to have a box of matches and start moving them into position to simplify and illustrate the points to myself." He left Maudling in charge at the Treasury, and promoted Heath to a new business and economic portfolio. The latter took the lead in the one substantial piece of domestic legislation of Douglas-Home's premiership, the abolition of resale price maintenance.

The Resale Prices Bill was introduced to deny manufacturers and suppliers the power to stipulate the prices at which their goods must be sold by the retailer. At the time, up to forty per cent of goods sold in Britain were subject to such price fixing, to the detriment of competition and to the disadvantage of the consumer. Douglas-Home, less instinctively liberal on economic matters than Heath, would probably not have sponsored such a proposal unprompted, but he gave Heath his backing, in the face of opposition from some cabinet colleagues, including Butler, Hailsham and Lloyd, and a substantial number of Conservative backbenchers. They believed the change would benefit supermarkets and other large retailers at the expense of proprietors of small shops. The government was forced to make concessions to avoid defeat. Retail price maintenance would continue to be legal for some goods; these included books, on which it remained in force until market forces led to its abandonment in 1995. Manufacturers and suppliers would also be permitted to refuse to supply any retailer who sold their goods at less than cost price, as a loss leader. The bill had a difficult Parliamentary passage during which the Labour party generally abstained, leaving the Conservatives to vote for or against their own government. The bill received the royal assent in July 1964, but did not become operative until 1965, by which time Douglas-Home, Heath and their colleagues were out of office.

A plot to kidnap Douglas-Home in April 1964 was foiled by the Prime Minister himself. Two left-wing students from the University of Aberdeen followed him to the house of John and Priscilla Buchan, where he was staying. He was alone at the time and answered the door, where the students told him that they planned to kidnap him. He responded, "I suppose you realise if you do, the Conservatives will win the election by 200 or 300." He gave his intending abductors some beer, and they abandoned their plot. (Note: Douglas-Home never publicly spoke of the kidnapping because he did not want to ruin the career of his bodyguard but told the story in 1977 to Hailsham, who recorded it in his diaries. In July 2009 BBC Radio 4 broadcast a dramatisation of the event entitled The Night They Tried to Kidnap the Prime Minister, written by Martin Jameson and starring Tim McInnerny as Douglas-Home.)

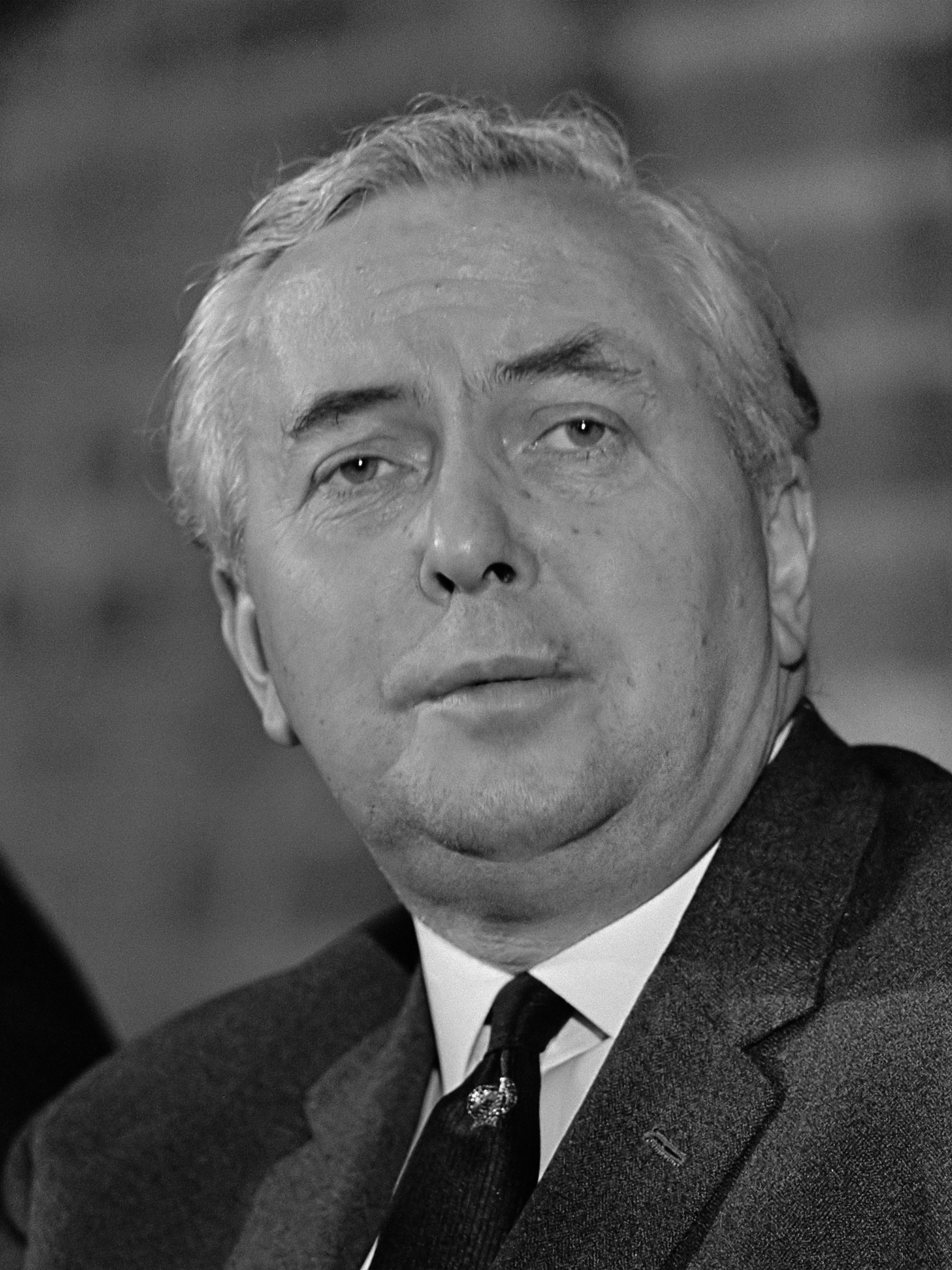
Harold Wilson, Leader of the Opposition and Douglas-Home's successor

The term of the Parliament elected in 1959 was due to expire in October 1964. Parliament was dissolved on 25 September and following three weeks of campaigning the 1964 general election took place on 15 October. Douglas-Home's speeches dealt with the future of the nuclear deterrent, while fears of Britain's relative decline in the world, reflected in chronic balance of payment problems, helped the Labour Party's case. The Conservatives under Douglas-Home did much better than widely predicted, but Labour under Wilson won with a narrow majority. Labour won 317 seats, the Conservatives 304 and the Liberals 9.

== In opposition (1964–1970) ==
As Leader of the Opposition, Douglas-Home persuaded Macleod and Powell to rejoin the Conservative front bench. Within weeks of the general election Butler retired from politics, accepting the post of Master of Trinity College, Cambridge together with a life peerage. Douglas-Home did not immediately allocate shadow portfolios to his colleagues, but in January 1965 he gave Maudling the foreign affairs brief and Heath became spokesman on Treasury and economic affairs. There was no immediate pressure for Douglas-Home to hand over the leadership to a member of the younger generation, but by early 1965 a new Conservative group called PEST (Pressure for Economic and Social Toryism) had discreetly begun to call for a change. Douglas-Home either did not know, or chose to ignore, the fact that Heath had made a donation to PEST. He decided that the time was coming for him to retire as leader, with Heath as his preferred successor.

Enoch Powell returned to the Conservative front bench in 1964 and later sought the party leadership.

Determined that the party should abandon the "customary processes of consultation", which had caused such rancour when he was appointed in 1963, Douglas-Home set up an orderly process of secret balloting by Conservative MPs for the election of his immediate and future successors as party leader. In the interests of impartiality the ballot was organised by the 1922 Committee, the backbench Conservative MPs. Douglas-Home announced his resignation as Conservative leader on 22 July 1965. Three candidates stood in the 1965 Conservative Party leadership election: Heath, Maudling and Powell. Heath won with 150 votes (one of them cast by Douglas-Home) to 133 for Maudling and 15 for Powell.

Douglas-Home accepted the foreign affairs portfolio in Heath's shadow cabinet. Many expected this to be a short-lived appointment, a prelude to Douglas-Home's retirement from politics. It came at a difficult time in British foreign relations: events in the self-governing colony of Rhodesia (formerly Southern Rhodesia), which had been drifting towards crisis for some years, finally erupted into open rebellion against British sovereignty. The predominantly white minority government there opposed an immediate transfer to black majority rule before the colony had achieved sovereign statehood, and in November 1965 it unilaterally declared independence. Douglas-Home won the approval of Labour MPs such as Wedgwood Benn, later known as Tony Benn, for his unwavering opposition to the rebel government, and for ignoring those on the right wing of the Conservative party who sympathised with the rebels on racial grounds.

In 1966 Douglas-Home became president of the Marylebone Cricket Club (MCC), which was then the governing body of English and world cricket. The presidency had generally been a largely ceremonial position, but Douglas-Home became embroiled in two controversies, one of them with international implications. This was the so-called "D'Oliveira affair", in which the inclusion of a non-white player in the England team to tour South Africa led to the cancellation of the tour by the apartheid regime in Pretoria. In his account of the affair, the political journalist Peter Oborne criticises Douglas-Home for his vacillating attitude towards South African prime minister John Vorster with whom, says Oborne, "he was no more robust than Chamberlain had been with Hitler thirty years earlier". Douglas-Home's advice to the MCC committee not to press the South Africans for advance assurances on D'Oliveira's acceptability, and his optimistic assurances that all would be well, became a matter of much criticism from a group of MCC members led by the Rev David Sheppard. The second controversy was not one of race but of social class. Brian Close was dropped as England captain in favour of Colin Cowdrey. Close was dropped after using delaying tactics when captaining Yorkshire in a county match, but the move was widely seen as biased towards cricketers from the old amateur tradition, which had officially ended in 1963. (Note: Until 1963 those taking part in first-class cricket were classed as "Gentlemen" (amateurs) or "Players" (professionals). Amateurs had long dominated the running of the game. Until 1950 the panel of selectors who chose the England team was exclusively amateur (with the exception of the 1926 and 1930 panels to which Jack Hobbs and Wilfred Rhodes were co-opted) and it was not until 1952 that a professional cricketer, Leonard Hutton, was first appointed captain of the England team. Close was from the professional side of the game. The Birmingham Post wrote of him, "the man possibly destined to become England's greatest cricket captain, was sacrificed on the altar of the old school tie. In drizzly conditions at Edgbaston in 1967, Yorkshire under Close deprived Warwickshire of victory with timewasting tactics that finally saw just two overs bowled in the last 15 minutes.")

Wilson's small majority after the 1964 general election had made the transaction of government business difficult, and in 1966 he called another election in which Labour gained a strong working majority of 96. Some older members of Heath's team, including Lloyd, retired from the front bench, making room for members of the next generation. Heath moved Maudling to the foreign affairs portfolio, and Douglas-Home took over Lloyd's responsibilities as spokesman on Commonwealth relations. Heath was widely seen as ineffective against Wilson, and as the 1970 general election approached there was concern within the party that he would lose, and that Powell would seek to replace him as leader. Maudling and the chief whip, William Whitelaw, believed that if Heath had to resign Douglas-Home would be the safest candidate to keep Powell out. Douglas-Home shared their view that Labour would win the 1970 election, and that Heath might then have to resign, but he declined to commit himself. To the surprise of almost everyone except Heath, the Conservatives won the election, with a majority of 31 seats.

Douglas-Home received an Honorary Doctorate from Heriot-Watt University in 1966.

== Foreign and Commonwealth Secretary (1970–1974) ==
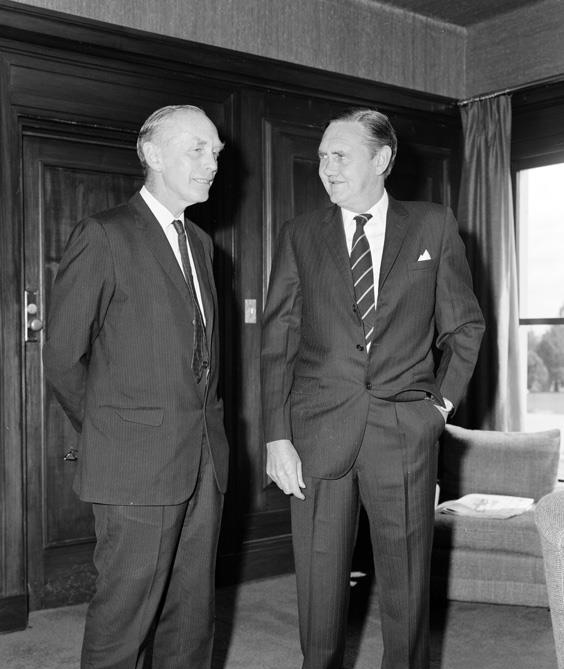
Douglas-Home with the Australian Prime Minister John Gorton in 1970.

Heath invited Douglas-Home to join the cabinet, taking charge of Foreign and Commonwealth Affairs. In earlier centuries it had not been exceptional for a former prime minister to serve in the cabinet of a successor, and even in the previous fifty years Arthur Balfour, Stanley Baldwin, Ramsay MacDonald and Neville Chamberlain had done so. Until 2023, when David Cameron was appointed Foreign Secretary, Douglas-Home was the most recent former prime minister to be appointed to a ministerial post. (Note: Prime ministers who served under one or more of their successors include: the Duke of Grafton under North, the Duke of Portland under Pitt, Addington under Grenville, Goderich under Grey, Wellington under Peel, Balfour under Asquith, Lloyd George and Baldwin, Baldwin under MacDonald and MacDonald under Baldwin, and Chamberlain under Churchill.) Of Balfour's appointment to Asquith's cabinet in 1916, Lord Rosebery, who had been prime minister in 1894–95, said that having an ex-premier in the cabinet was "a fleeting and dangerous luxury". Thorpe writes that Heath's appointment of Douglas-Home "was not a luxury but an essential buttress to his administration".

The Wilson government had merged the Colonial Office and the Commonwealth Relations Office in 1966 into the Commonwealth Office, which, two years later, was merged with the Foreign Office, to form the Foreign and Commonwealth Office (FCO). Heath appointed Douglas-Home to head the department, with, once again, a second cabinet minister, this time Anthony Barber, principally responsible, as Heath had been in the 1960s, for negotiations on Britain's joining the EEC. This time, both ministers were in the Commons; Barber's cabinet post was officially Chancellor of the Duchy of Lancaster.

Within weeks of the election Barber was moved from the FCO to the Treasury to take over as chancellor from Iain Macleod, who died suddenly on 20 July. Though they had never enjoyed an easy relationship, Douglas-Home recognised his colleague's stature, and felt his loss politically as well as personally. Some commentators have maintained that Macleod's death and replacement by the less substantial figure of Barber fatally undermined the economic success of the Heath government.

Barber was replaced at the FCO by Geoffrey Rippon, who handled the day-to-day negotiations, under the direction of Heath. Douglas-Home, as before, concentrated on east–west and Commonwealth matters. He was in agreement with Heath's policy on the EEC, and did much to persuade doubters on the right wing of the Conservative party of the desirability of Britain's entry. Hurd writes:

By temperament and background he was some distance removed from Heath's passionate commitment to a united Europe. All the more important was his steadfast support for British entry, which he based on a clear assessment of Britain's place in the modern world, and in particular her relationship with France and Germany on the one hand and the United States on the other ... thus providing the right of the Conservative Party with much needed assurance.

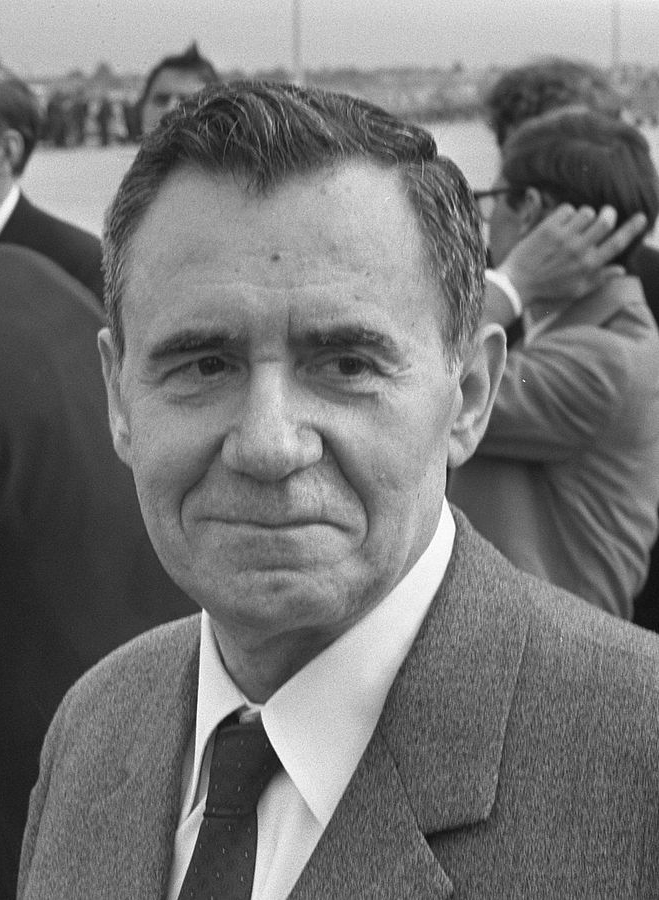
Andrei Gromyko, Douglas-Home's Soviet counterpart

In east–west relations, Douglas-Home continued his policy of keeping the Soviet Union at bay. In September 1971, after receiving no satisfactory results from negotiations with Gromyko about the flagrant activities of the KGB in Britain, he expelled 105 Soviet diplomats for spying. In addition to the furore arising from this, the Soviets felt that the British government's approach to negotiations on détente in Europe was over-cautious, even sceptical. Gromyko was nonetheless realistic enough to maintain a working relationship with the British government. Within days of the expulsions from London he and Douglas-Home met and discussed the Middle East and disarmament. In this sphere of foreign policy, Douglas-Home was widely judged a success.

During the period of the Heath government, the Special Relationship with the United States deteriorated to a low ebb. This has been attributed to Heath's lack of sensitivity to the political mood and also a calculated distancing, anxious to avoid playing into European fears that Britain would always favour America. More recently analysis has emphasised growing protectionism and isolationism in the United States and the way both President Nixon and Henry Kissinger operated. Areas of dispute include the India-Pakistan War and the Yom Kippur War. The American administration resented the lack of support received at the UN Security Council, while Britain had less than two hours' notice of the decision to open relations with China, and none on the termination of the Bretton Woods Agreement, both in 1971. Whilst an Atlanticist and not the cause of the issue, nor was Douglas-Home successful in mitigating its impact.

In negotiations on the future of Rhodesia Douglas-Home was less successful. He was instrumental in persuading the rebel leader, Ian Smith, to accept proposals for a transition to African majority rule. Douglas-Home set up an independent commission chaired by a senior British judge, Lord Pearce, to investigate how acceptable the proposals were to majority opinion in Rhodesia. After extensive fieldwork throughout Rhodesia, the commission reported, "We are satisfied on our evidence that the proposals are acceptable to the great majority of Europeans. We are equally satisfied ... that the majority of Africans rejected the proposals. In our opinion the people of Rhodesia as a whole do not regard the proposals as acceptable as a basis for independence." To Douglas-Home's disappointment there was no resolution, and Rhodesia remained a rebel regime long after he left office.

== Retirement (1974–1995) ==
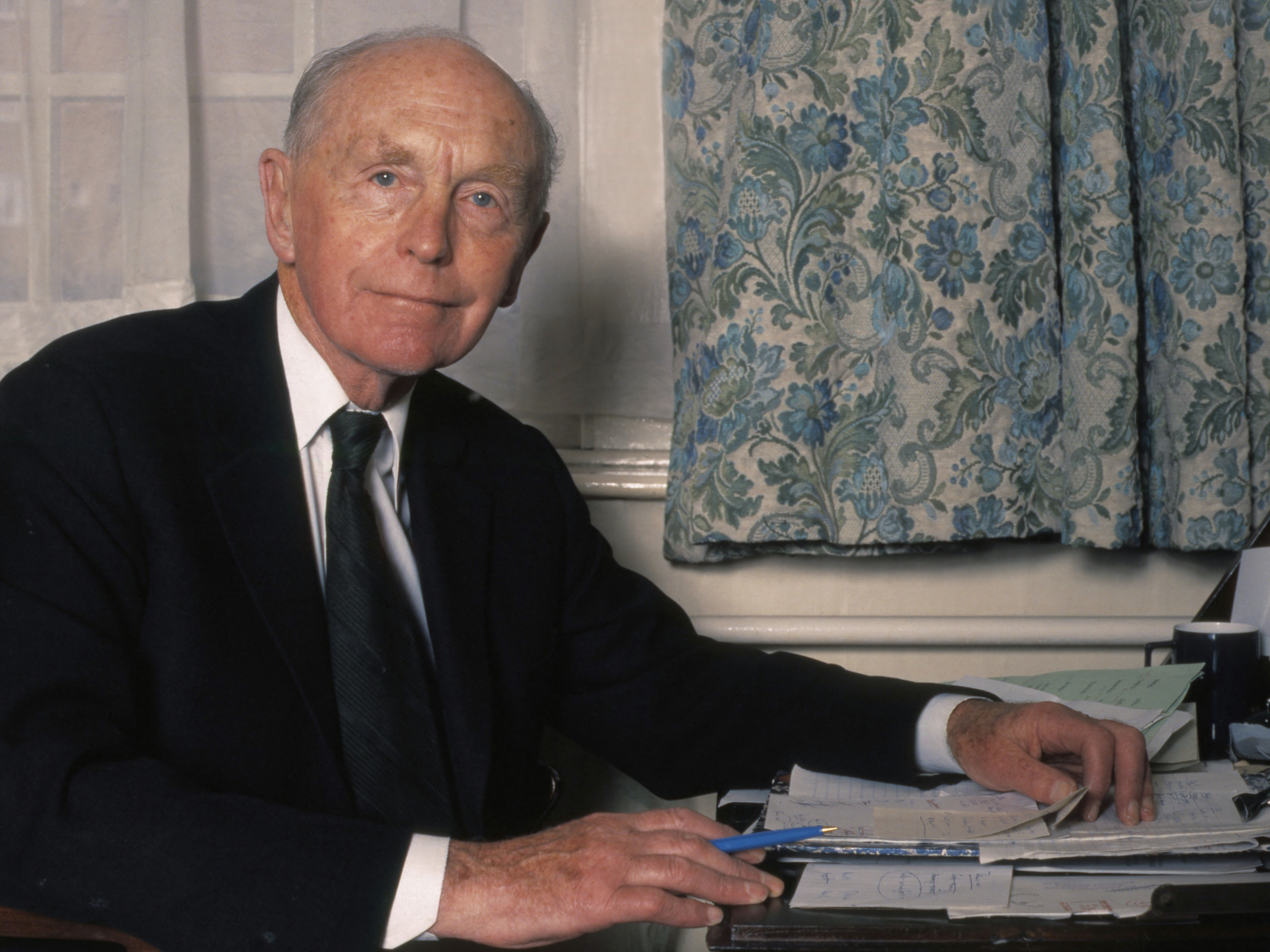
Home, photographed by Allan Warren, in 1986

At the February 1974 general election the Heath government was narrowly defeated. Douglas-Home, then aged 70, stepped down at the second election of that year, called in October by the minority Labour government in the hope of winning a working majority. He returned to the House of Lords at the end of 1974 when he accepted a life peerage, becoming known as Baron Home of the Hirsel, of Coldstream in the County of Berwick.

Between 1977 and 1989 Home was Governor of I Zingari, the nomadic cricket team. In retirement he published three books: The Way The Wind Blows (1976), described by Hurd as "a good-natured autobiography, with perhaps more anecdotes than insights", Border Reflections (1979), and his correspondence with his grandson Matthew Darby, Letters to a Grandson (1983). In the 1980s Home increasingly spent his time in Scotland, with his family. He was a keen fisherman and enjoyed shooting. Hurd writes that "there was no sudden moment when he abandoned politics", rather that "his interventions became fewer and fewer". His last speech in the House of Lords was in 1989, when he spoke against Hurd's proposals for prosecuting war criminals living in Britain: "After such a lapse of time justice might not be seen to be done. It would be dangerous to rely on memories of events that occurred so long ago. It was too late to reopen the issue." His withdrawal from public affairs became more marked after the death of his wife in 1990, after 54 years of marriage.

== Personal life ==
In 1936 Douglas-Home married Elizabeth Alington; her father, Cyril Alington, had been Douglas-Home's headmaster at Eton, and was from 1933 Dean of Durham. The service was at Durham Cathedral, conducted by Alington together with William Temple, Archbishop of York and Hensley Henson, Bishop of Durham. In addition to the large number of aristocratic guests, the household and estate staffs of the Douglas-Home properties at Douglas Castle and the Hirsel were invited. There were four children of the marriage: Caroline, Meriel, Diana and David. The latter was Home's heir, who became the 15th Earl of Home in 1995. (Note: Douglas-Home's biographer D. R. Thorpe notes that during the passage through Parliament of the Peerage Act 1963, the draft legislation originally provided that a disclaimed peerage would lapse permanently, rather than merely for the lifetime of the disclaimant. Thorpe observes that if this provision had remained a condition of disclaiming his earldom in 1963, thus preventing his son from inheriting the title in due course, Home would not have gone ahead and would not have become Prime Minister.)

Douglas-Home died at the Hirsel on 9 October 1995, aged 92, four months after the death of his parliamentary opponent Harold Wilson. He was buried in Lennel churchyard, Coldstream.

== Reputation ==
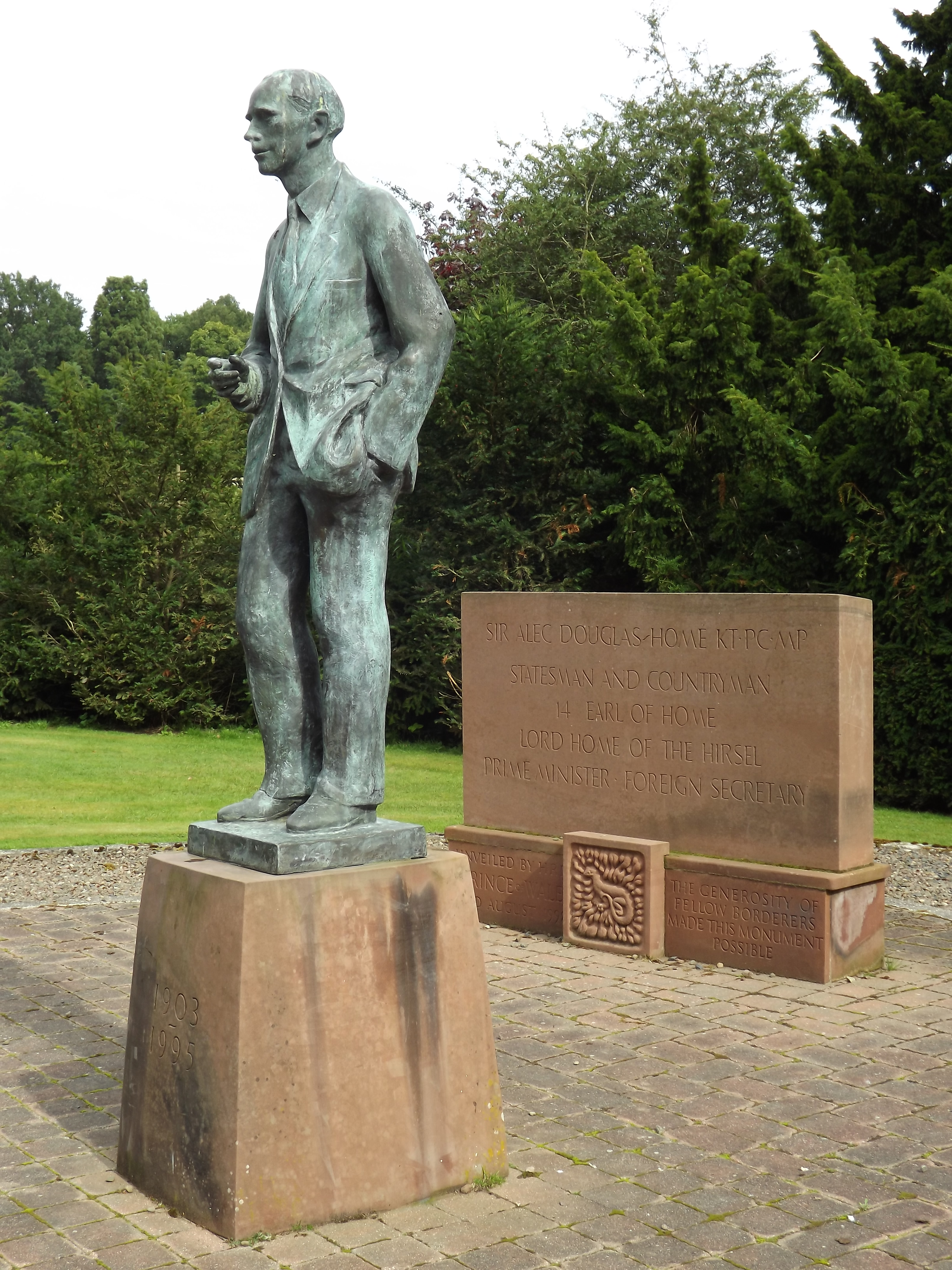
Statue of Douglas-Home at The Hirsel by sculptor Professor Bill Scott, unveiled in 1998.

Home's premiership was short and not conspicuous for radical innovation. Hurd remarks, "He was not capable of Macmillan's flights of imagination", but he was an effective practical politician. At the Commonwealth Relations Office and the Foreign Office he played an important role in helping to manage Britain's transition from imperial power to European partner. Both Thorpe and Hurd quote a memo that Macmillan wrote in 1963, intended to help the Queen choose his successor:

Lord Home is clearly a man who represents the old governing class at its best ... He is not ambitious in the sense of wanting to scheme for power, although not foolish enough to resist honour when it comes to him ... He gives that impression by a curious mixture of great courtesy, and even if yielding to pressure, with underlying rigidity on matters of principle. It is interesting that he has proved himself so much liked by men like President Kennedy and Mr Rusk and Mr Gromyko. This is exactly the quality that the class to which he belongs have at their best because they think about the question under discussion and not about themselves.

Douglas Hurd, once Home's private secretary, and many years later his successor (after seven intermediate holders of the post) as Foreign and Commonwealth Secretary, wrote this personal comment: "The three most courteous men I knew in politics were Lord Home, King Hussein of Jordan, and President Nelson Mandela. All three had ease of birth, in the sense that they never needed to worry about who they themselves were and so had more time to concern themselves with the feelings of others."

Although some in the Conservative party agreed with Wilson (and Jo Grimond, the Liberal leader) that the Conservatives would have won the 1964 election if Butler had been prime minister, The Times observed, "it should not be overlooked that in October 1963 Home took over a Government whose morale was shattered and whose standing in the opinion polls was abysmal. A year later Labour won the general election, with an overall majority of only four seats. That [Home] recovered so much ground in so short a time was in itself an achievement." Looking back across Home's career, The Times considered that his reputation rested not on his brief premiership, but on his two spells as Foreign Secretary: "He brought to the office ... his capacity for straight talking, for toughness towards the Soviet Union and for firmness (sometimes interpreted as a lack of sympathy) towards the countries of Africa and Asia. But he brought something else as well: an unusual degree of international respect."

== Cabinet (1963–1964) ==
The Home cabinet, announced on 20 October 1963, was:

- Lord Home (Sir Alec Douglas-Home from 23 October): Prime Minister and First Lord of the Treasury
- R A Butler: Secretary of State for Foreign Affairs
- Quintin Hogg: Lord President of the Council and Minister for Science
- Lord Dilhorne: Lord Chancellor
- Reginald Maudling: Chancellor of the Exchequer
- Henry Brooke: Secretary of State for the Home Department
- Duncan Sandys: Secretary of State for the Colonies and Secretary of State for Commonwealth Relations
- Edward Heath: Secretary of State for Industry, Trade, and Regional Development and President of the Board of Trade
- Peter Thorneycroft: Minister of Defence
- Selwyn Lloyd: Lord Privy Seal
- Lord Blakenham: Chancellor of the Duchy of Lancaster
- Christopher Soames: Minister of Agriculture, Fisheries and Food
- Ernest Marples: Minister of Transport
- John Boyd-Carpenter: Chief Secretary to the Treasury and Paymaster General
- Michael Noble: Secretary of State for Scotland
- Sir Edward Boyle: Minister of Education
- Joseph Godber: Minister of Labour
- Sir Keith Joseph: Minister of Housing and Local Government and Minister for Welsh Affairs
- Frederick Erroll: Minister of Power
- Anthony Barber: Minister of Health
- Geoffrey Rippon: Minister of Public Building and Works
- W F Deedes: Minister without Portfolio
- Lord Carrington: Minister without Portfolio, Leader of the House of Lords

Changes

- April 1964: Quintin Hogg became Secretary of State for Education and Science. Sir Edward Boyle left the cabinet. The post of Minister of Defence became Secretary of State for Defence with Thorneycroft retaining it.

== Arms ==
Coat of arms of Alec Douglas-Home
Notes The image at left shows his achievement of arms as Earl of Home. Crest 1st, On a Cap of Maintenance Proper a Lion's Head erased Argent (Home); 2nd, On a Cap of Maintenance Proper a Salamander Vert encircled with Flames of Fire Proper (Douglas). Escutcheon Quarterly, 1st and 4th grandquarterly, 1st and 4th, Vert a Lion rampant Argent armed and langued Gules (Home); 2nd and 3rd, Argent three Popinjays Vert beaked and membered Gules (Pepdie of Dunglas); over all an Inescutcheon Or charged with an Orle Azure (Landale); 2nd and 3rd grandquarterly, 1st, Azure a Lion rampant Argent armed and langued Gules crowned with an Imperial Crown Or (Lordship of Galloway); 2nd, Or a Lion rampant Gules armed and langued Azure debruised of a Ribbon Sable (Abernethy); 3rd, Argent three Piles Gules (Lordship of Brechin); 4th, Or a Fess chequy Azure and Argent surmounted of a Bend Sable charged with three Buckles of the Field (Stewart of Bonkill); over all on an Inescutcheon Argent a Man's Heart Gules ensigned with an Imperial Crown Proper and a Chief Azure charged with three Mullets of the Field (Douglas). Supporters On either side a Lion Argent armed and langued Gules. Motto Above the first crest: A Home, a Home, a Home. Above the second crest: Jamais arrière (Never behind). Below the arms: True to the end. Orders The collar of the Order of the Thistle.

== Notes and references ==
Notes

== Sources ==
- Chayes, Abram (1974), The Cuban Missile Crisis, International Crises and the Role of Law, New York: Oxford University Press, ISBN 0-19-519758-5
- Churchill, Winston (1985) [1948], The Gathering Storm, New York: Houghton Mifflin, ISBN 0-395-41055-X
- Connolly, Cyril (1961) [1949], Enemies of Promise, Harmondsworth: Penguin Books, OCLC 4377425
- Divine, Robert A. (1971), The Cuban Missile Crisis, Chicago: Quadrangle Books, ISBN 0-8129-0183-5
- Dutton, David (2006), Douglas-Home, The 20 British Prime Ministers of the 20th Century, London: Haus Publishing, ISBN 1-904950-67-1
- Gromyko, Andrei (1989), Memoirs, London: Arrow Books, ISBN 0-09-968640-6
- Heath, Edward (1998), The Course of My Life – My Autobiography, London: Hodder and Stoughton, ISBN 0-340-70852-2
- Hennessy, Peter (2001), The Prime Minister – The Office and its Holders Since 1945, London: Penguin, ISBN 0-14-028393-5
- Home, Lord (1976), The Way the Wind Blows – An Autobiography, London: Collins, ISBN 0-00-211997-8
- —— (1979), Border Reflections – Chiefly on the Arts of Shooting and Fishing, London: Collins, ISBN 0-00-216301-2
- —— (1983), Letters to a Grandson, London: Collins, ISBN 0-00-217061-2
- Howard, Anthony (1987), RAB – The Life of R A Butler, London: Jonathan Cape, ISBN 0-224-01862-0
- Hutchinson, George (1980), The Last Edwardian at No 10 – An Impression of Harold Macmillan, London and New York: Quartet Books, ISBN 0-7043-2232-3
- Ingrams, Richard (1971), The Life and Times of Private Eye, London: Penguin, ISBN 0-7139-0255-8
- Maitland, Donald (1996), Diverse Times, Sundry Places, Brighton: Alpha Press, ISBN 1-898595-17-8
- Newsom, David (2001), The Imperial Mantle, Bloomington: Indiana University Press, ISBN 0-253-10849-7
- Oborne, Peter (2004), Basil D'Oliveira. Cricket and Conspiracy: The Untold Story, London: Little, Brown, ISBN 0-316-72572-2
- Pike, E. Royston (1968), Britain's Prime Ministers, London: Odhams, ISBN 0-600-72032-2
- Pimlott, Ben (1992), Harold Wilson, London: Harper Collins, ISBN 0-00-215189-8
- Roth, Andrew (1972), Heath and the Heathmen, London: Routledge and Keegan Paul, ISBN 0-7100-7428-X
- Thomas-Symonds, Niklaus (2010), Attlee – A Life in Politics, London: Tauris, ISBN 978-1-84511-779-5
- Thorpe, D. R. (1997), Alec Douglas-Home, London: Sinclair-Stevenson, ISBN 1-85619-663-1
- —— (2010), Supermac – The Life of Harold MacMillan, London: Chatto and Windus, ISBN 978-0-7011-7748-5
- Wilby, Peter (2006), Anthony Eden, The 20 British Prime Ministers of the 20th Century, London: Haus Publishing, ISBN 1-904950-65-5
- Wilson, Geoffrey (1976), Cases and Materials on Constitutional and Administrative Law, Cambridge: Cambridge University Press, ISBN 0-521-20816-5
- Young, John W. (2007), "International Factors and the 1964 Election", Contemporary British History, 21 (3): 351–371, doi:10.1080/13619460600825931, S2CID 154812255, archived from the original on 8 November 2021
- Young, Kenneth (1970), Sir Alec Douglas-Home, London: Dent, OCLC 471161294

Parliament of the United Kingdom
Preceded by Thomas Dickson	Member of Parliament for Lanark; 1931–1945	Succeeded by Tom Steele
Preceded by Tom Steele	Member of Parliament for Lanark; 1950–1951	Succeeded by Patrick Maitland
Preceded by Gilmour Leburn	Member of Parliament for Kinross and Western Perthshire; 1963 – 1974	Succeeded by Nicholas Fairbairn
Political offices
Preceded by George Hall	Under Secretary of State for Foreign Affairs; 1945; Served alongside: The Lord Lovat	Succeeded by Hector McNeil
Preceded by Peggy Herbison as Under Secretary of State for Scotland	Minister of State for Scotland; 1951–1955	Succeeded by Tom Galbraith
Preceded by The Viscount Swinton	Secretary of State for Commonwealth Relations; 1955–1960	Succeeded by Duncan Sandys
Preceded by The Marquess Salisbury	Lord President of the Council; 1957	Succeeded by The Viscount Hailsham
Preceded by The Marquess Salisbury	Leader of the House of Lords; 1957–1960	Succeeded by The Viscount Hailsham
Preceded by The Viscount Hailsham	Lord President of the Council; 1959–1960	Succeeded by The Viscount Hailsham
Preceded by Selwyn Lloyd	Secretary of State for Foreign Affairs; 1960–1963	Succeeded by Rab Butler
Preceded by Harold Macmillan	Prime Minister of the United Kingdom; 1963–1964	Succeeded by Harold Wilson
Preceded by Harold Wilson	Leader of the Opposition; 1964–1965	Succeeded by Edward Heath
Preceded by Christopher Soames	Shadow Foreign Secretary; 1966–1970	Succeeded by Denis Healey
Preceded by Michael Stewart	Secretary of State for Foreign and Commonwealth Affairs; 1970–1974	Succeeded by Jim Callaghan
Party political offices
Preceded by The Marquess Salisbury	Leader of the Conservative Party in the House of Lords; 1957–1960	Succeeded by The Viscount Hailsham
Preceded by Harold Macmillan	Leader of the Conservative Party; 1963–1965	Succeeded by Edward Heath
Honorary titles
Preceded by The 8th Duke of Buccleuch and Queensberry	Chancellor of the Order of the Thistle; 1973–1992	Succeeded by The 9th Duke of Buccleuch and Queensberry
Peerage of Scotland
Preceded by Charles Douglas-Home	Earl of Home; 1951–1963¹	Disclaimed Title next held by David Douglas-Home
Notes and references
1. Home disclaimed his peerage in 1963 in order to be eligible for election in the Commons
