= Esmé Gordon =

Scottish architect (1910–1993)

Alexander Esmé Gordon RSA, FRIBA, FRIAS (12 September 1910 – 31 May 1993) was a Scottish Modernist architect, writer, and painter who served as Secretary of the Royal Scottish Academy between 1973 and 1978.

Born in Edinburgh and educated at Edinburgh Academy and Edinburgh College of Art, Gordon worked as an assistant at Burnet, Tait, and Lorne before setting up his own practice in Edinburgh with James Robertson. During the Second World War, Gordon served in the Royal Engineers. In 1946, he formed a partnership with William Gordon Dey. Gordon worked mostly on ecclesiastical, educational, and commercial buildings: notable designs include the South of Scotland Electricity Board's George Street headquarters and Heriot-Watt University's Department of Brewing and Biochemistry as well as additions to St Giles' Cathedral and Moray House. In the latter part of his life, Gordon devoted his energies to the Royal Scottish Academy, serving as its Secretary between 1973 and 1978. Gordon was also a watercolourist, art collector, and author of books on St Giles' Cathedral, church design, and the Royal Scottish Academy.

== Biography ==
=== Early life ===
Gordon's parents were Alexander Shand Gordon WS (d.1938) (son of Alexander Gordon Solicitor of the Supreme Court), and Elizabeth Catherine Logan (d.1947). He was born on 12 September 1910 in Ramsay Garden in the Old Town of Edinburgh and brought up at 36 Heriot Row in the New Town. Gordon received secondary education at Edinburgh Academy. Between 1928 and 1934, he studied at Edinburgh College of Art under John Begg, John Summerson, and Adam Bruce Thomson. While at Edinburgh College of Art, he won various minor scholarships that helped him to make sketching tours of England and two month-long trips to Italy in 1931 and 1933. In 1934, Gordon won the Owen Jones Scholarship, which he used to travel to Italy in 1935.

He spent a year with Burnet, Tait, and Lorne in London, returning in 1934 as a qualified assistant. He worked mostly under Tait and his senior assistant Andrew D. Bryce. He was proposed as an associate of the Royal Institute of British Architects by John Begg, Alexander Lorne Campbell and Frank Mears and admitted on 2 December 1935.

=== Independent practice ===
In 1937 Gordon began his own practice at 34 Castle Street, Edinburgh, and was joined in partnership by James Robertson. At this time, Gordon also taught architecture at Edinburgh College of Art and worked in the offices of James Wallace. Robertson and Gordon worked in partnership until about 1940, when Gordon joined the Royal Engineers. He later saw active service as well as working on the construction of canteens and post-war reconstruction in Normandy and the Netherlands.

Gordon returned from war service in 1945 and, the following year, took his former assistant William Gordon Dey into partnership, creating the partnership Gordon and Dey. Gordon was admitted as an associate of the Royal Incorporation of Architects in Scotland in 1948 and was elected fellow of the Royal Institute of British Architects in 1956, having been proposed by John Ross McKay, Leslie Grahame Thomson, and Thomas Waller Marwick.

By 1956, Gordon had moved his office to his former home at 36 Heriot Row; the practice moved to Liberton in 1975 and Leith in 1991. Dey retired from the practice in 1982.

=== Later life ===
Gordon was a member of the Scottish Committee of the Arts Council between 1959 and 1965 and president of the Edinburgh Architectural Association between 1955 and 1957; he designed the Association's Centenary Bronze Medal, awarded annually from 1957. He was elected an associate of the Royal Scottish Academy in 1956, becoming an Academician in 1967 and the academy's Secretary between 1973 and 1978. He retired as a senior partner of Gordon and Dey to devote himself the work of the academy. Jean Jones called Gordon "one of the Royal Scottish Academy's most committed and effective members": he was a strong defender of the academy's independence against the threat of absorption by the neighbouring Scottish National Gallery. Gordon also researched the history of the academy, uncovering artefacts such as plans by Thomas Hamilton and a collection of calotypes by David Octavius Hill.

From 1988 until his death, Gordon lived in Barnton. Gordon died in Edinburgh's City Hospital, Colinton Mains, on 31 May 1993 at the age of 82. He is buried with his parents in Grange Cemetery in south Edinburgh. The grave lies on the north wall of the later south-west extension.

A memorial exhibition was held at the RSA in 1994. A collection of Gordon's designs is held by the Royal Incorporation of Architects in Scotland.

== Work ==
=== Architecture ===
Most of Gordon's original designs are classified as Modernist; however, some of his buildings have also been described as Classical, "modern-ish", "modern-traditional", and "Neo-Fascist".

While training with Burnet, Tait, and Lorne, Gordon worked on projects including St Andrew's House and as part of the team that designed the 1938 Empire Exhibition. He also submitted unsuccessful competition entries for a house for George V's silver jubilee and for buildings at Duncan of Jordanstone College of Art, Dundee.

In 1939, after establishing his own practice, Gordon designed Innerleven East Parish Church, Methil. Following the Second World War, Gordon continued to work largely in ecclesiastical commissions. Among his original designs for churches are St David's Parish Church, Broomhouse (1960) and North Parish Church, Stirling (1970). Gordon was architect to St Giles' Cathedral, Edinburgh; Gordon's work in the cathedral includes the design of the organ case (1940), alterations in the Albany Aisle to create a war memorial chapel (1951), and a memorial plaque to George VI in the Thistle Chapel. Gordon's other ecclesiastical work includes the cloister of Warriston Crematorium, Edinburgh (1967) – which the authors of the Buildings of Scotland guide to Edinburgh describe as "modern-ish" – and alterations for Free Church College, Edinburgh (1950); St Andrews' Parish Church, Edinburgh (1953); and Allan Park Parish Church, Stirling (1963). In his restoration work, Gordon frequently collaborated with the sculptor Benno Schotz.

Between 1947 and 1980, Gordon made a number of additions to Moray House, Edinburgh. The most prominent of these are Dalhousie Land (1960), built in a style the authors of the Buildings of Scotland guide to Edinburgh describe as "modern-traditional", and the now-demolished gymnasium (1968). The gymnasium's attenuated portico is cited by Miles Gledinning, Ranald MacInnes, and Aonghus MacKechnie as a late example of the "severe, usually astylar classicism" popular in eastern Scotland's post-war urban architecture; the authors of the Buildings of Scotland guide to Edinburgh describe the design as "Neo-Fascist". Among Gordon's other educational buildings are Heriot-Watt University's Department of Brewing and Biochemistry, Edinburgh (1960s) and Oxgangs Primary School (1953).

Among Gordon's commercial buildings are the headquarters of the Scottish Life Assurance Co., Edinburgh (1960) and the South of Scotland Electricity Board, Edinburgh (1960). Glendinning, MacInnes, and MacKechnie reference these as the leading example's of the stone-faced classical style that Gordon and Dey developed in the 1960s. Gordon also executed alterations to British Linen Bank buildings in Edinburgh, Hawick, Johnstone, and Berwick-upon-Tweed (1949) and designed the Bank of Scotland's Musselburgh branch (1969).

Gordon's residential buildings include a number of homes for the elderly, such as Eventide Homes at Loanhead, Gargunnock, Alloa, and Galashiels (after 1947) and Newbattle House, Edinburgh (1975). Gordon designed only two completed houses, one of which was his own house at 10A Greenhill Park, Edinburgh. This was designated a Category B listed building in 2004 with a statement of special interest that calls the house: "A major example of a relatively unaltered, late Modernist private dwelling, and a major example of its building type".

=== Writing ===
Gordon's work in church building was reflected in his books A Short History of St Giles Cathedral, Edinburgh (1954) and A Handbook on the Principles of Church Building: Furnishing, Equipment and Decoration (1963). Gordon's extensive research on the history the Royal Scottish Academy, resulted in The Royal Scottish Academy of Painting Sculpture and Architecture 1826-1976 (1976) and The Making of the Royal Scottish Academy (1988).

=== Painting ===
Gordon usually painting landscapes in watercolours. 52 of his watercolours were exhibited in a solo show at the Scottish Gallery in 1988; he also frequently exhibited at the Royal Scottish Academy and Royal Scottish Society of Painters in Watercolour.

== Personal life ==
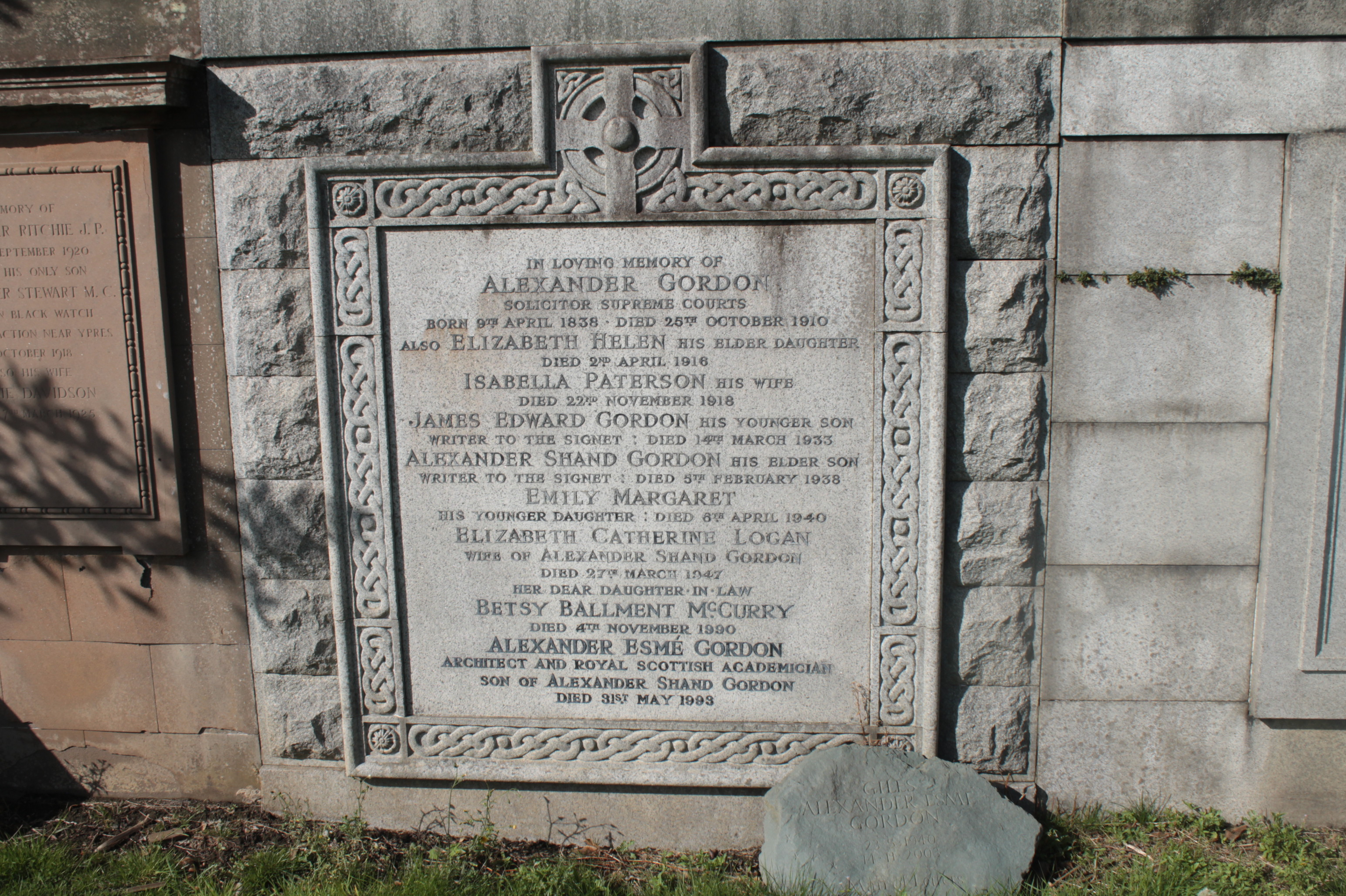
The grave of Esme Gordon, Grange Cemetery

Gordon was married to Betsy McCurry from 1937 to her death in 1990. Originally from Belfast, McCurry was a pianist and graduate of the Royal Academy of Music. The couple had a daughter, Celia, and two sons, Christopher and Giles, the latter of whom became a prominent literary agent. Gordon's friends included the painters Denis Peploe and Robin Philipson and the architectural historians Nikolaus Pevsner and John Summerson.

Gordon was a scholar and collector of Asian art and travelled frequently with his wife to India, the Far East, and Italy. Gordon bequeathed The Geisha Girl by George Henry from his collection to the Scottish National Gallery.

Robert Scott Morton and Anthony Wheeler described Gordon as "enthusiastic, generous and sociable, and an entertaining raconteur". Jean Jones wrote of Gordon: "Though a lively raconteur with old-fashioned courtesies, his outlook on life - political and otherwise - was more radical than his manner suggested, not least in the way he treated women as equals. He rarely spoke of his own achievements."

== See also ==
- William Gordon Dey
- Giles Gordon
