= Janet Pierce =

Scottish-born painter based in Ireland (born 1947)

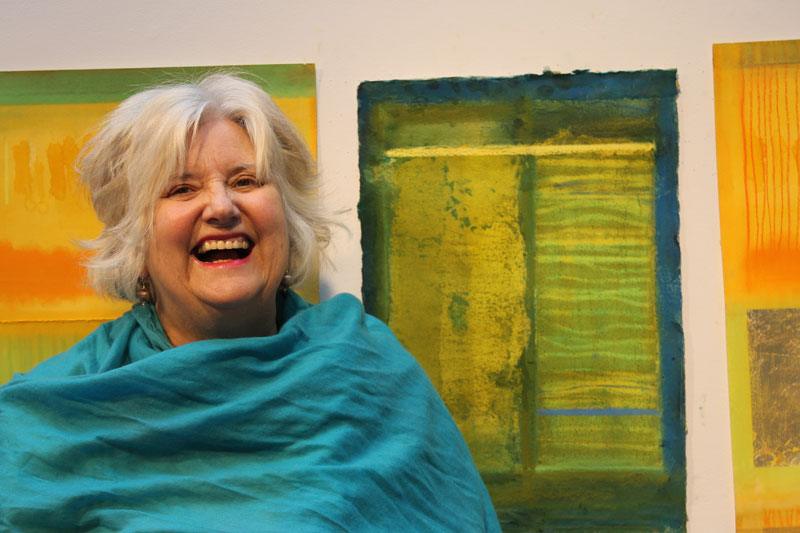
- Born: 1947 (age 78–79); Edinburgh, Scotland
- Education: Edinburgh College of Art; Moray House School of Education
- Known for: acrylics, watercolour, tapestry
- Spouses: Richard Pierce; Felim Egan (m. 1993; sep. 2005)
- Children: 3
- Elected: Aosdána (2000)
- Website: janetpierce.com

Janet Pierce (born 1947) is a Scottish-born painter based in Ireland. She is a member of Aosdána, an elite Irish association of artists.

== Early life ==
Pierce was born in Edinburgh in 1947.

== Career ==
Pierce studied at Edinburgh College of Art and Moray House School of Education in 1965–69. Elizabeth Blackadder and William George Gillies were early influences.

She taught in borstals for a year before moving her career to the United States, first exhibiting at the Everhart Museum in Pennsylvania. She moved to Ireland in 1977 and has lived and worked there since.

Pierce was elected to Aosdána in 2000. She has also received awards from the Fundación Valparaíso and Sanskriti Foundation. Much of her work was based on the landscapes and seascapes of the Scottish Highlands and County Donegal; since 2006 she has also incorporated Indian influences. In The Irish Times, Ian Hill said "No closet romantic, Janet Pierce would surely have us respond with tears to the boldness of her large and moody landscapes, strong in colour, rich in storm and sunset. […] she strives on the one hand to capture spiritual darkness, on the other to release an unfashionable lightness of being. […] Surprising are the centres of her paintings' surfaces, where encrusted papers enfold a delicacy of detail through an accomplished eye."

In 2015 she illustrated Ladakh, a book of poetry by Sudeep Sen.

== Personal life ==
Pierce had three children with her first husband, architect Richard Pierce. In 1993, she married Irish artist Felim Egan; they lived in Edinburgh and Sandymount. They separated in the mid-2000s.

Pierce lives in the Tyrone Guthrie Centre, County Monaghan.
