= Lloyds Bank Building =

Building in London, England

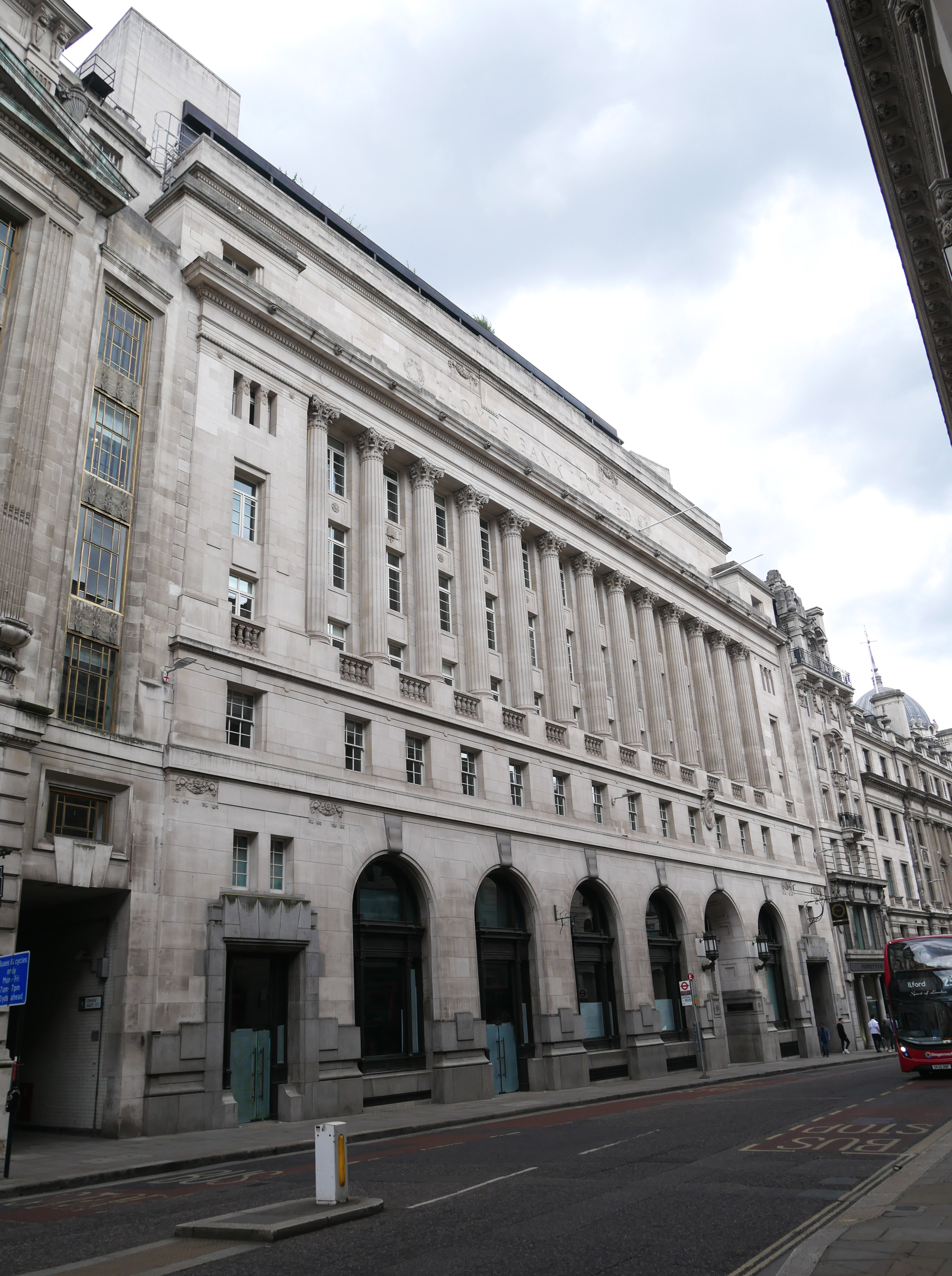
- Lloyds Bank Building, Cornhill frontage
- Interactive map of the Lloyds Bank Building area

General information
- Type: Office
- Architectural style: Neoclassical, Beaux Arts
- Location: London, England
- Coordinates: 51°30′47″N 0°05′15″W
- Completed: 1930

Design and construction
- Architects: Burnet, Tait and Lorne

Listed Building – Grade II*
- Official name: 15-22, CORNHILL EC3, 71-77, LOMBARD STREET EC3
- Designated: 10 November 1977
- Reference no.: 1064709

The Lloyds Bank Building is a large office building on a plot between Lombard Street and Cornhill in the City of London. It is Grade II* listed for its architectural significance.

== History and description ==
Lloyds Bank was established in 1765 in Birmingham, and would gradually move its main operations to London over the following centuries. The first London office was built at 71 Lombard Street. The clearing of buildings for a newly built headquarters would lead to the neighbouring Union Insurance offices at No. 24 to collapse in 1923, being rebuilt by Webb & Son. rebuilt between 1927 and 1930 as the head offices of Lloyds. The building is designed by Burnet, Tait and Lorne.

Lloyds Bank used the building as their headquarters until moving to Gresham Street in 1989. The building continues being used as offices and by 2012, also hosted a restaurant in its former banking hall.

The building sits on a trapezium is of Portland stone with granite coursing and floors. The Cornhill side, a row of engaged giant Corinthian order columns sit atop a peristyle, with Ionic pilasters mirroring the design on the Lombard Street side both atop arcaded ground floors. Monumental entrances are flanked by lanterns with cartouches above.
