= Cristina Iannelli =

Cristina Iannelli, FBA, FAcSS is an Italian educationalist and academic, specialising in large scale studies of social inequality and social mobility. Since 2014, she has been Professor of Education and Social Stratification at the Moray House School of Education, University of Education. After degrees from the University of Messina and the European University Institute, she joined Moray House in 1999 as a research fellow before becoming a lecturer in 2008.

In July 2022, she was elected Fellow of the British Academy (FBA), the United Kingdom's national academy for the humanities and social sciences. She is also an elected Fellow of the Academy of Social Sciences (FAcSS).

== Selected works ==
- Iannelli, C.; Raffe, D. (2006). "Vocational Upper-Secondary Education and the Transition from School". European Sociological Review. 23 (1): 49–63. doi:10.1093/esr/jcl019.
- Paterson, Lindsay; Iannelli, Cristina (2007). "Social Class and Educational Attainment: A Comparative Study of England, Wales, and Scotland". Sociology of Education. 80 (4): 330–358. doi:10.1177/003804070708000403.
- Iannelli, Cristina (2007). "Inequalities in Entry to Higher Education: a Comparison Over Time between Scotland and England and Wales". Higher Education Quarterly. 61 (3): 306–333. doi:10.1111/j.1468-2273.2007.00357.x.
- Iannelli, Cristina; Smyth, Emer (2008). "Mapping gender and social background differences in education and youth transitions across Europe". Journal of Youth Studies. 11 (2): 213–232. doi:10.1080/13676260701863421.
- Iannelli, Cristina (2013). "The role of the school curriculum in social mobility". British Journal of Sociology of Education. 34 (5–6): 907–928. doi:10.1080/01425692.2013.816031.
- Iannelli, Cristina; Huang, Jun (2014). "Trends in participation and attainment of Chinese students in UK higher education". Studies in Higher Education. 39 (5): 805–822. doi:10.1080/03075079.2012.754863.
- Iannelli, Cristina; Smyth, Emer; Klein, Markus (2016). "Curriculum differentiation and social inequality in higher education entry in Scotland and Ireland". British Educational Research Journal. 42 (4): 561–581. doi:10.1002/berj.3217. hdl:20.500.11820/84dffc2b-31f5-4dec-a58e-b58bc09d0e3c.
- Iannelli, Cristina; Duta, Adriana (2018). "Inequalities in school leavers' labour market outcomes: do school subject choices matter?". Oxford Review of Education. 44 (1): 56–74. doi:10.1080/03054985.2018.1409970. hdl:20.500.11820/c3a5421b-bb1d-4dfd-a27d-b5e1d5737376.
