= William Gordon Dey =

Scottish architect

William Gordon Dey FRIBA (1911–1997) was a Scottish architect. He was a partner in the influential firm of Gordon & Dey which specialised in college buildings and had a long-running working relationship with Moray House School of Education.

== Life ==
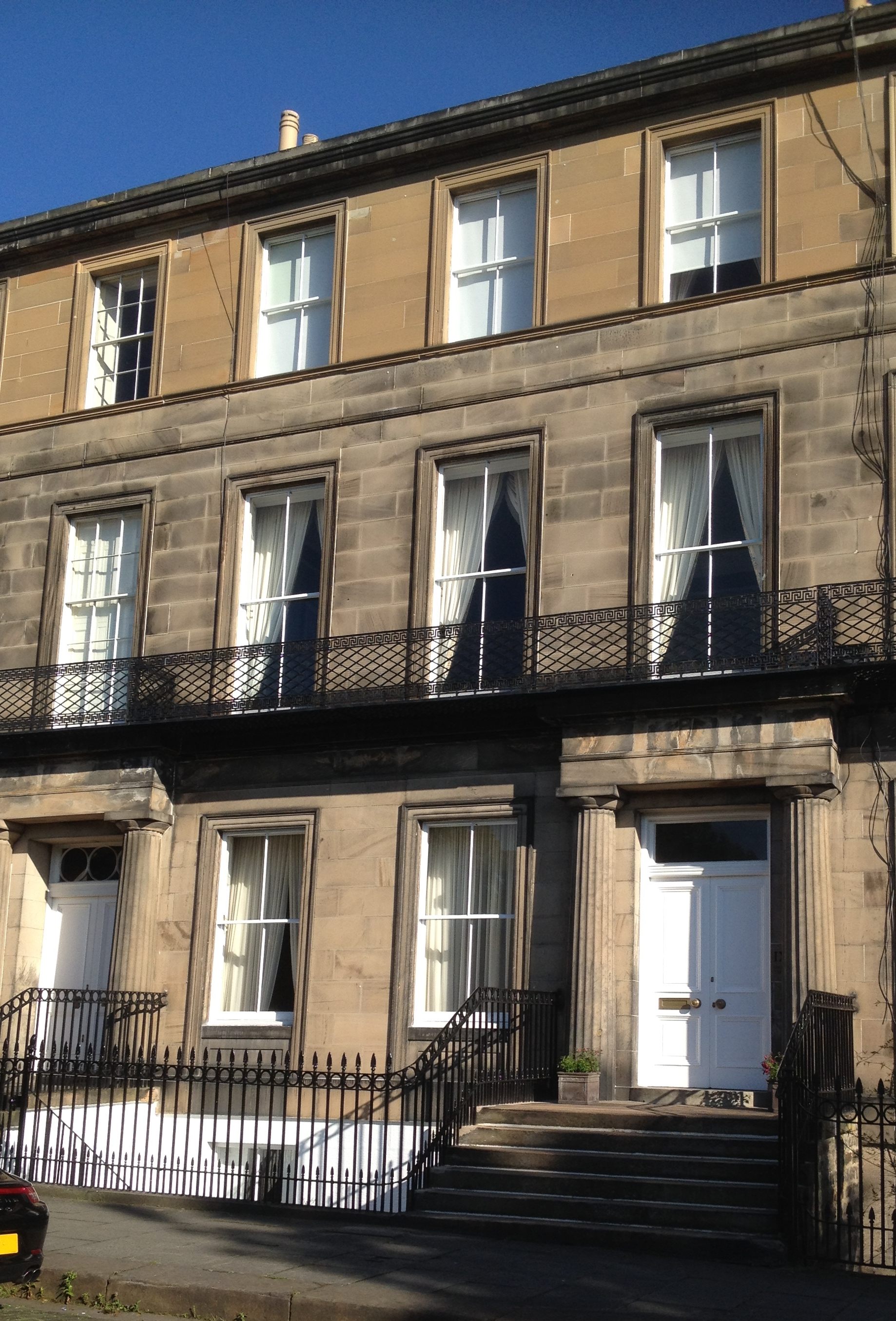
9 Regent Terrace, childhood home of William Gordon Dey

He was the son of Alexander John Dey FRSE (1868–1937) a pharmaceutical and manufacturing chemist, originally from Rothiemay, and his wife Isabella Scott Robertson. He was born at home, 9 Regent Terrace, on Calton Hill in Edinburgh on 29 April 1911. He was educated at the Royal High School almost adjacent to his home. In 1929 he began studying architecture at the Edinburgh College of Art. Here he met and befriended his future business partner, Esmé Gordon.

In his year out (1933–4) he made a study tour of Norway, Denmark and the Netherlands. He then worked under William Kininmonth in the offices of Rowand Anderson & Paul. In 1935 he undertook a study tour of Paris and London and enrolled in Britain's first Town Planning course, under Frank Mears in Edinburgh. He concurrently helped the then-elderly John Begg in one of his final projects: the Westfield Autocar project in Stirling. In December 1935 he qualified RIBA, giving both his home and business address as Rothiemay, 22 St John's Road, Edinburgh: a large Victorian villa on the east side of Corstorphine. In 1936 he briefly joined the City Architect's Department under Ebenezer James MacRae and undertook the condition survey of the Canongate prior to its redevelopment.

In 1937 he joined the office of Alexander Esme Gordon as an architect, working on the transport pavilion for the Glasgow Empire Exhibition. However this was interrupted by the Second World War. Initially he joined the Scots Guards but then undertook officer training at Sandhurst and received a commission to serve in the Gordon Highlanders. He saw active service with the 8th Army in Egypt, including El Alamein, and rose to the rank of captain. He received an early de-mob in 1945 to help with the Clackmannan County Plan under James Shearer but in 1946 returned to his friend Esme Gordon as a full partner, thereafter known as Gordon & Dey. The company moved from 20 Dovecot Road in Corstorphine to 36 Heriot Row in the New Town as their fortunes grew.

He died at the Royal Victoria Hospital in Edinburgh on 16 October 1997.

== Non-Architectural Interests ==
Dey lived all his adult life in Corstorphine and was a keen local historian, writing Corstorphine: A Pictorial History of a Midlothian Village (1990). He was an active member (and Honorary President) of the Corstorphine Trust and oversaw the archive held in the Dower House.

He was a member of the Scottish Council for Spastics in Edinburgh and of the Abbeyfield Trust (housing the elderly). He served as a Special Constable for thirty years after the war and received a long-service medal for this role. He was also the official assistant to the Master at the Merchant Company of Edinburgh.

He served first as an Elder then as Session Clerk in St Anne's Church Corstorphine, a post he held for 17 years.

== Family ==
He was married to Elizabeth (Betty) Margaret Corrigall (d.2011) in 1939.

== Notable buildings/works ==
- Furnishings in the war memorial chapel, St Giles Cathedral (1946)
- Church hall, Pennywell Road, Edinburgh (1949) main church now a listed building.
- Multiple buildings for Moray House School of Education in the Canongate including Charteris Land, St John's Land etc. (1952 to 1980)
- Oxgangs Primary School (1953)
- Internal refurbishment of Coldingham Priory (1955)
- Rebuilding of 176-184 Canongate (for Moray House) (1955)
- Rebuilding of 194-200 Canongate, Old Playhouse Close (1956)
- Internal rebuilding of Lodge Dunedin a Masonic lodge in Morningside, Edinburgh (1956)
- Electricity Showrooms, George Street (1960) demolished and replaced by a pastiche Georgian building
- St David's Church, Broomhouse, Edinburgh (1960)
- Department of Brewing and Biochemistry, Heriot-Watt (now part of the International Centre for Brewing and Distilling) (1961)
- North Parish Church, Stirling (1970)
- Gannochy Trust Sports Complex, Perth (1975)
- Kinnoull House and MacMillan House (offices), Perth (1975)
