= Moray House School of Education and Sport =

Part of Edinburgh University, Scotland

Coordinates: 55°56′59.76″N 3°10′46.10″W

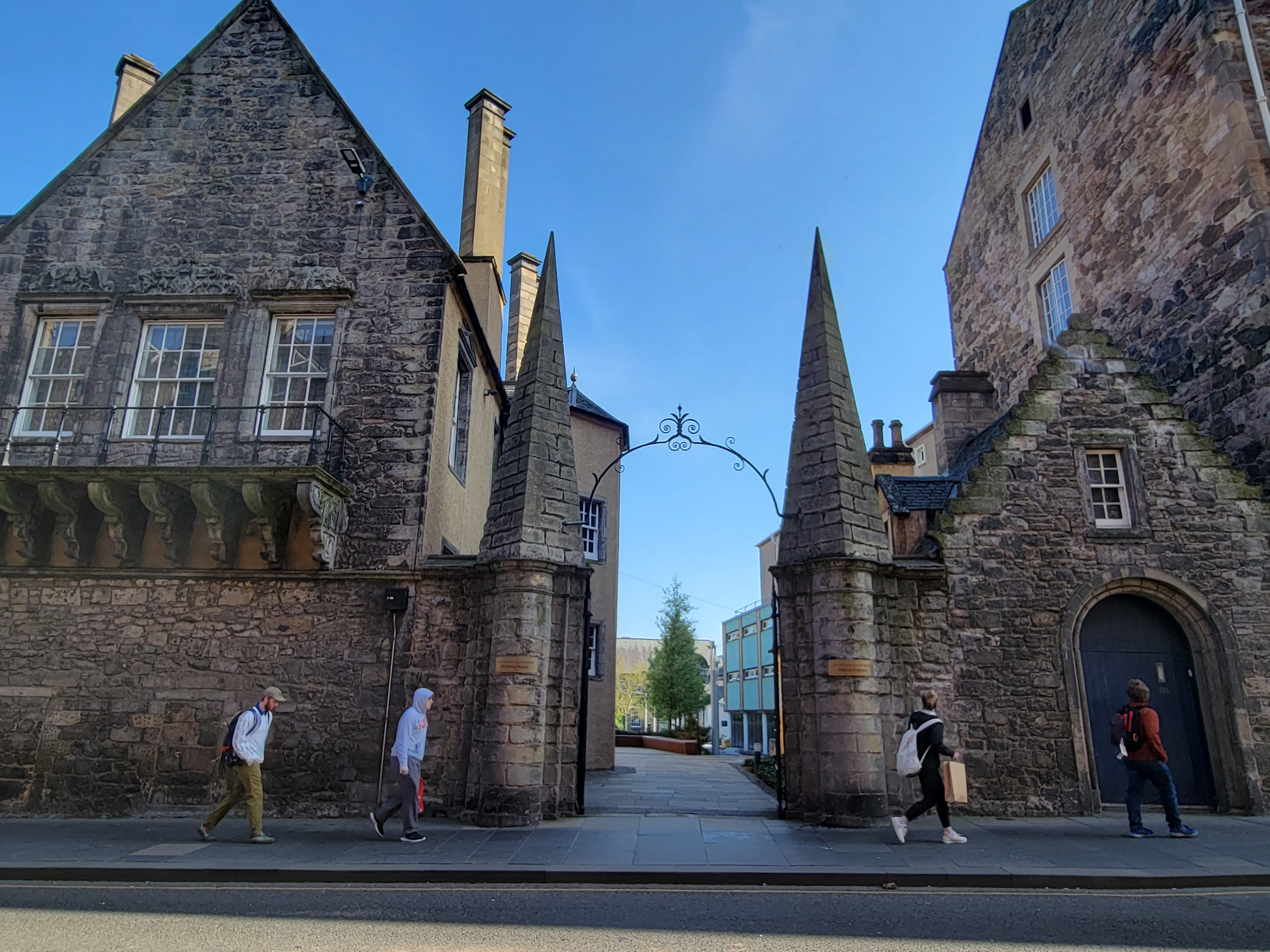
- Moray House Gate
- Established: 1848; 178 years ago
- Affiliations: University of Edinburgh
- Head of School: Professor Carol Campbell
- Students: c.2000
- Location: Edinburgh, Scotland, UK
- Campus: Holyrood
- Website: www.ed.ac.uk/education

The Moray House School of Education and Sport ('Moray House') is a department within the College of Arts, Humanities and Social Sciences at the University of Edinburgh in Scotland.

It is based in historic buildings on the Holyrood Campus, located between the Canongate and Holyrood Road. The school offers academic programmes at all levels of higher education, including teacher education, Community Education, Digital Education, Outdoor and Environmental Education, Language Education, Physical Education and Sports science.

The School has approximately 2000 students and nearly 500 academic and professional staff.

== History ==
The school has existed in one form or another since the mid-19th century, joining the University of Edinburgh in 1998. The institution currently known as Moray House was originally opened as a normal school following the Disruption of 1843. Known as The Free Church of Scotland's Normal and Sessional School, it was originally located in Whitefield Chapel, and then in rooms below the Music Room in Rose Street. In 1848, the school moved to its current location in Moray House, in the Canongate.

From 1864 to 1907 its Rector was Maurice Paterson LLD.

In 1907, this institution merged with its Church of Scotland equivalent (the Church of Scotland Training College) and the Edinburgh Provincial Training Centre was formed, with the church training colleges subsumed within this organisation. The new teaching building opened at Moray House in 1931.

Moray House College of Education was officially formed in 1959.

In the early 1980s, Callendar Park College of Education, in Falkirk, was merged with Moray House.

In 1987, Moray House merged with the Dunfermline College of Physical Education based at Cramond, and continued to exist on two separate campuses (Holyrood and Cramond) until 2001. In 1991, the institute was linked with Heriot-Watt University, Edinburgh; and was retitled Moray House Institute of Education. On 1 August 1998, Moray House Institute of Education merged with the University of Edinburgh becoming its Faculty of Education.

Following internal restructuring of the University of Edinburgh in 2002, Moray House became known as the Moray House School of Education.

In August 2019, Moray House School of Education was renamed Moray House School of Education and Sport.

== Structure ==
It is currently subdivided into four Institutes:

- Institute for Education, Community and Society
- Institute for Education, Teaching and Leadership
- Institute for Sport, Physical Education and Health Sciences
- Institute for Language Education

The School has seven thematic Research Hubs: Advanced Quantitative Research in Education; Children and Young People; Digital Education; Language, Interculturality and Literacies; Social Justice and Inclusion; Sport-Related Research; and Teacher Education, Curriculum and Pedagogy. In addition, Moray House has several Research Centres: Centre for Research in Digital Education; Centre for Research in Education, Inclusion and Diversity (CREID); and Physical Activity for Health Research Centre (PAHRC), along with a number of other Research Groups.

== Buildings of Moray House ==
The buildings of Moray House are located on the Holyrood campus adjacent to the Canongate in Edinburgh.

=== Development and history ===
During the nineteenth century, part of the original open area to the west of St John's Street and north of the South Back was occupied by breweries. These made use of the high-quality water from the springs and wells in this part of the Canongate.

In response to the shortage of teachers in Scotland in the late 1950s and early 1960s, Moray House looked to the possibility of building additional teaching facilities close to the existing estate at Holyrood. In 1961 Moray House purchased the property of the Aitchison Brewery. This included buildings at the ends of Playhouse and Old Playhouse Closes as well offices (no. 18 and 19 St John's Street), a tenement (no. 20) and Maltings. The price paid was £50,000.

In the 1970s, three specialist teaching buildings were built from designs by architects Gordon and Dey. They were St Leonard's Land (Physical Education), Chessel's Land (Visual Arts) and St Mary's Land (Science and Technical). The design of these buildings was representative of 1960s modernist architecture and somewhat out of sympathy with the surrounding areas of the Old Town. The bulk of the buildings were on land formerly occupied by the Edinburgh and Leith Brewery and before that by the Old Edinburgh Playhouse.

=== Chessel's Land ===
Chessel's Land was one of three buildings designed by architects Graham and Dey and constructed in the early 1970s; it opened in January 1974. It was unused for a number of years and demolished in 2013 to make way for student accommodation. Chessel's Land was designed as a specialist centre for the training of teachers in the Visual Arts, including painting, ceramics, textiles, sculpture, photography and jewellery. Inside the building were sixteen large studios and a large Exhibition Hall, which was available for both student and external use.

In the original plan for the site, the raised patio in front of Chessel's Land was planned to connect with a proposed Library and a Theatre fronting onto Holyrood Road. These buildings in turn were to be connected with the St Leonard's Land building on the opposite side Holyrood Road. In the event these plans were ruled out by the SED in 1978. The Theatre was never built and a new Library was eventually developed in Dalhousie Land.

Chessel's Land takes its name from Archibald Chessel, a successful wright to trade and stalwart member of the Tron Kirk who lived in the eighteenth century. He built the nearby Chessel's Court between 1745 and 1748. These were much-admired mansion flats built to accommodate persons of standing. They are still standing today and remain as private flats.

In 1993 Chessel's Land became the base for the Aesthetic Studies Department, when Drama studios were added. In 1996 Music was transferred from Old Moray House. With St Mary's Land, Chessel's Land was demolished in 2013 in preparation for construction of new student accommodation.

=== Charteris Land ===
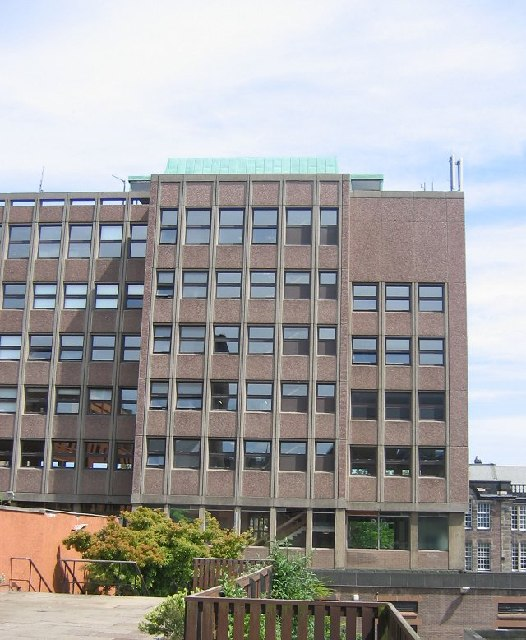
Charteris Land

Charteris Land is home to Moray House's departments of Educational Studies and part of the department of Curriculum Research & Development.

In 1964, draft plans for a ten-storey teaching block were drawn up by the architects, Gordon & Dey, to be built adjacent to the west side of St John Street. However, the Royal Fine Art Commission raised an objection to the planned height of the building. Consequently, the building of the finally agreed six storeys wasn't started until December 1966. Subsequent delays arising from industrial disputes meant the facility wasn't handed over until February 1969.

Following advice from the Edinburgh City Archivist this teaching block was named Charteris Land.

The front of Charteris Land boasts a sculptured wall (and a fourth panel), which were commissioned from David Miller, a member of staff at Moray House. The wall was cast in reinforced concrete into expanded polystyrene moulds. The sculpture was created in a continuous twenty-nine-hour operation by Arnott McLeod, Building Contractors.

The four panels all symbolise an aspect of educational theory:

- Panel 1 The Maze: Based on the use of the maze by psychologists such as Skinner and Tolman in experiments on rats to ascertain the power of deduction and memory retention in the learning process.
- Panel 2 Growth and Development: How a form of life starts with a coincidence of two elements and whose eventual shape is determined by external influences.
- Panel 3 Assimilation of Knowledge: Where differing units are selected and sorted in a rational way to form an organic retrieval system.
- Panel 4 Community: With different forms fitting together symbolising the interdependence of man, woman and child.

=== Dalhousie Land ===
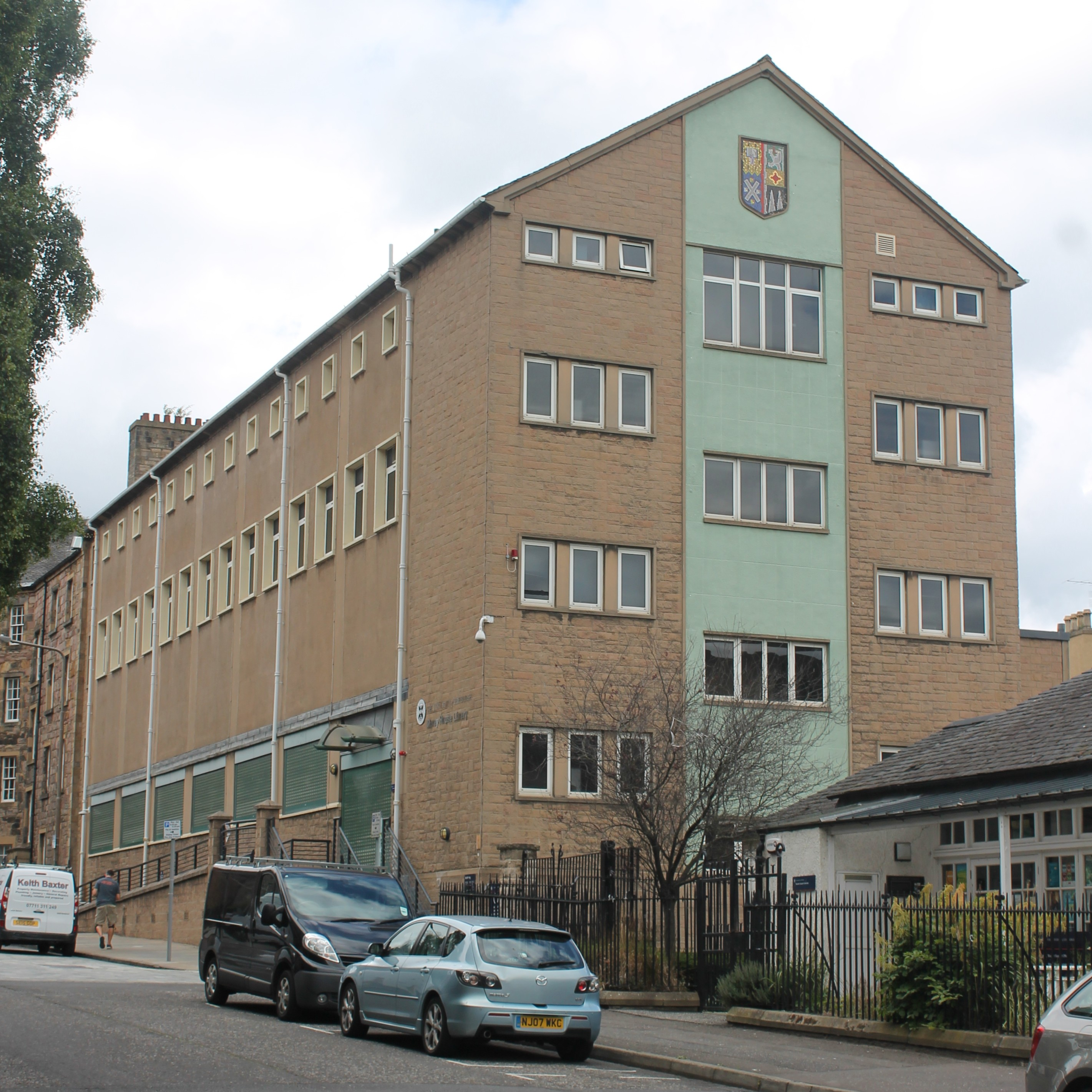
Dalhousie Land

Dalhousie Land is the library and ICT centre on Holyrood campus. It was again designed by the Edinburgh architects, Gordon & Dey, and was originally constructed in the early 1960s on the site of numbers 2 to 5 St John Street, and originally included a large lecture theatre, Art rooms and a swimming pool.

This new building was opened on 2 May 1963 by the Moderator of the General Assembly of the Church of Scotland, the Very Reverend Dr Neville Davidson, and was named Dalhousie Land.

In the early 1990s, Dalhousie Land was refurbished to become the new library for the Holyrood campus. Previously, periodicals, learning resources and books had occupied various rooms over three floors in Paterson's Land. A grant was obtained in 1994 to enable the relocation of all library facilities to Dalhousie Land. The refurbishment plans involved the retention of the original concrete container of the swimming pool, which was redesigned to house the periodicals collection. The current ground floor is at the level of the original edge of the swimming pool, and now houses the main stock area and Service Desk. A new mezzanine area was inserted on the south side and housed the Children's Book collection. The top floor was opened out to house library and computer work stations. This new Library was opened in August 1996.

In 1999/2000, a further refurbishment was undertaken to allow for the transfer of the stock from the Cramond campus library before its closure. This involved the creation of a new floor 3 out of the former lecture theatres on floor 2.

=== Old Kirk ===
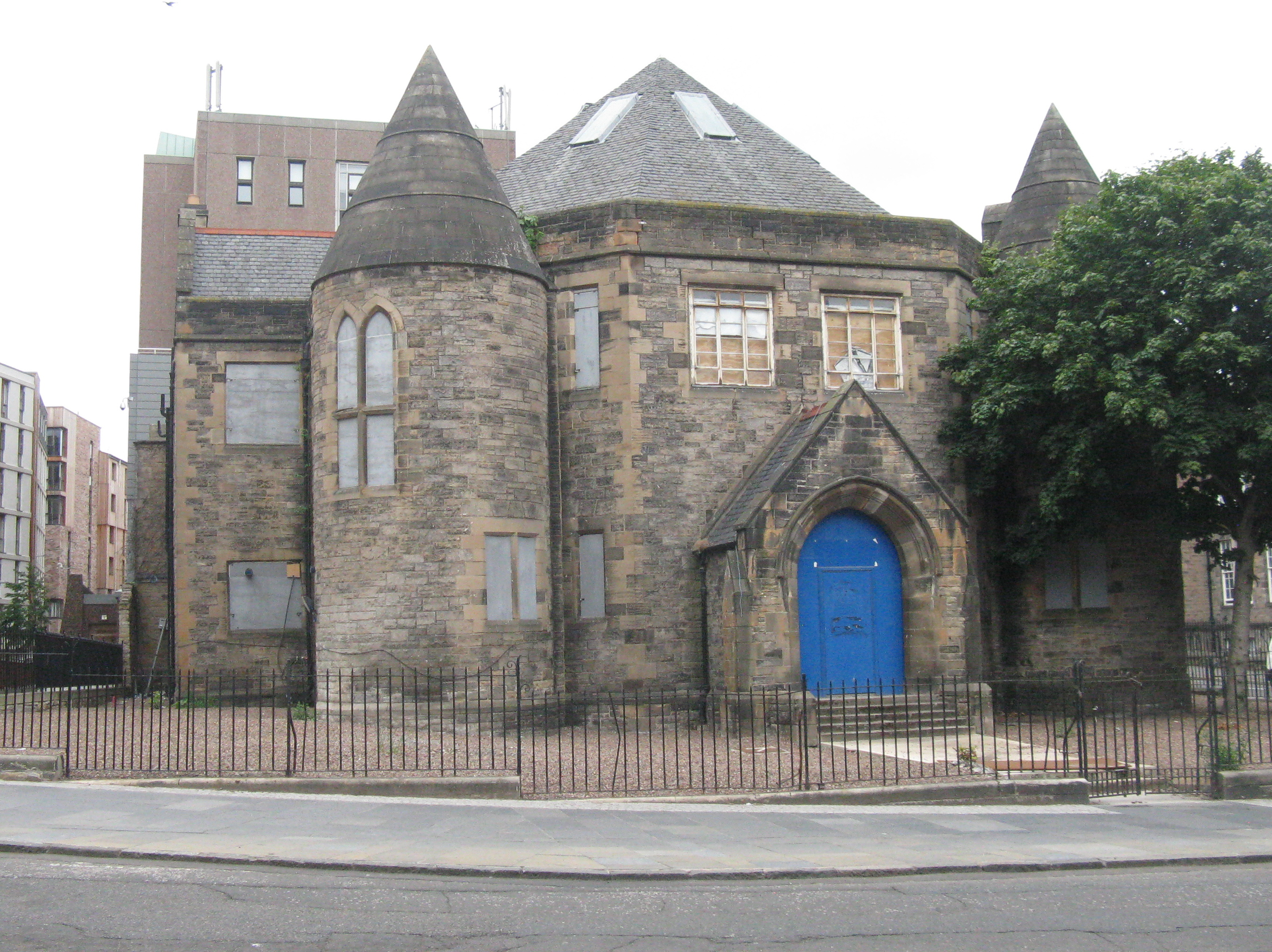
The Old Kirk

This building (currently closed) was the kirk of the Old (or Great) Kirk, a congregation which had originally worshiped in part of St. Giles' Cathedral from 1560, and in this Old Kirk between 1882 and 1941. John Knox is claimed as the congregation's first minister (1560–1572).

The building dates from 1881/2. The architects were Anderson and Browne. It stands on the site of the old drying green originally provided by the Earl of Wemyss to the residents of St John's Street in the 18th century.

In 1944 Moray House acquired the Old Kirk and its adjacent Hall. Following a major adaptation it became the base for the Music and Educational Handwork departments in 1949. A stage was constructed on the first floor using the timber from discarded desks. The City issued the Governors of Moray House in 1979 with a notice to demolish the Old Kirk's adjacent Hall, which had become dangerous. Until the merger with the University of Edinburgh in 1998 the building had latterly housed Moray House's Building Services. It closed and is currently a base for construction workers on adjacent sites.

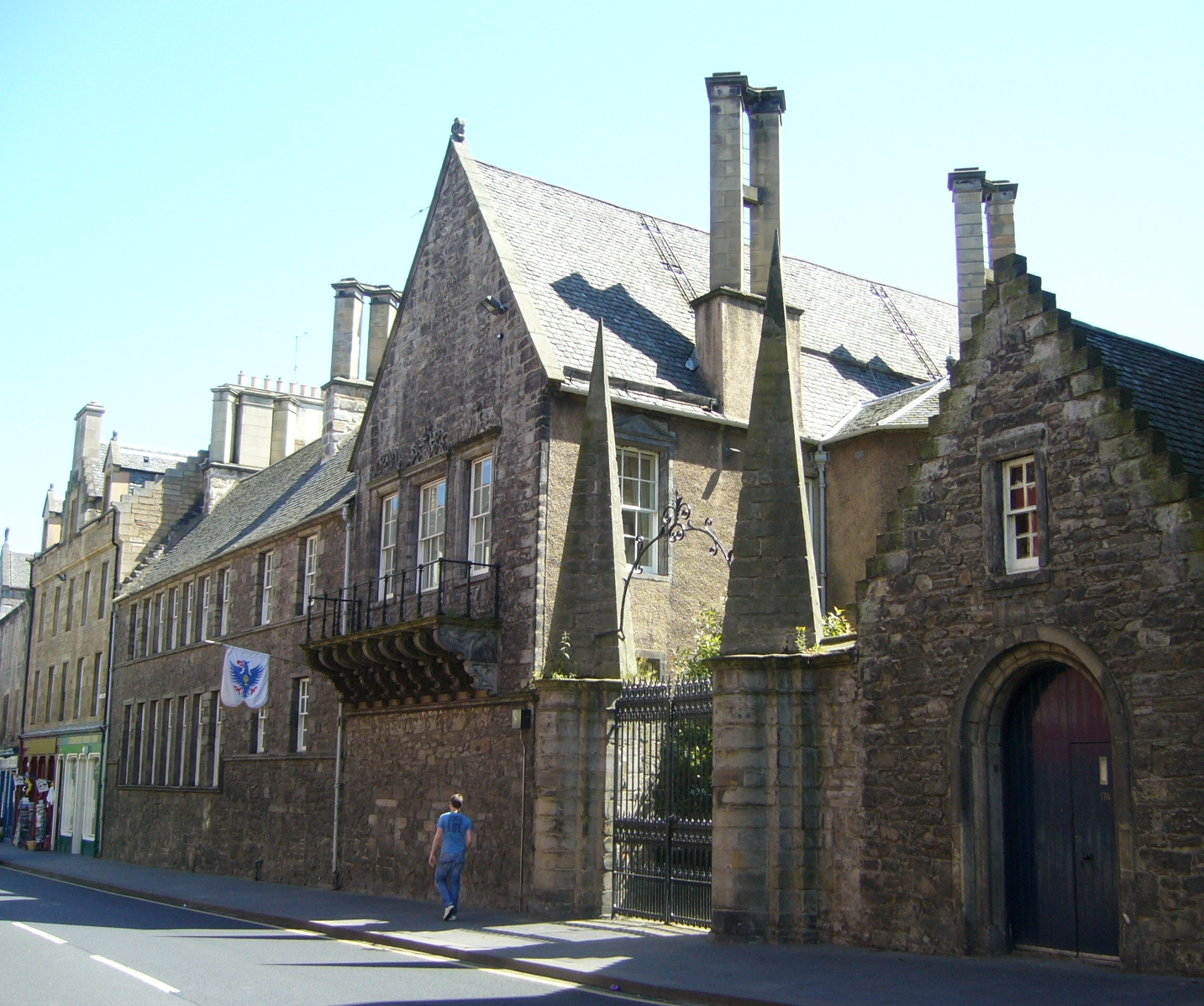
Old Moray House from the Canongate

=== Old Moray House ===
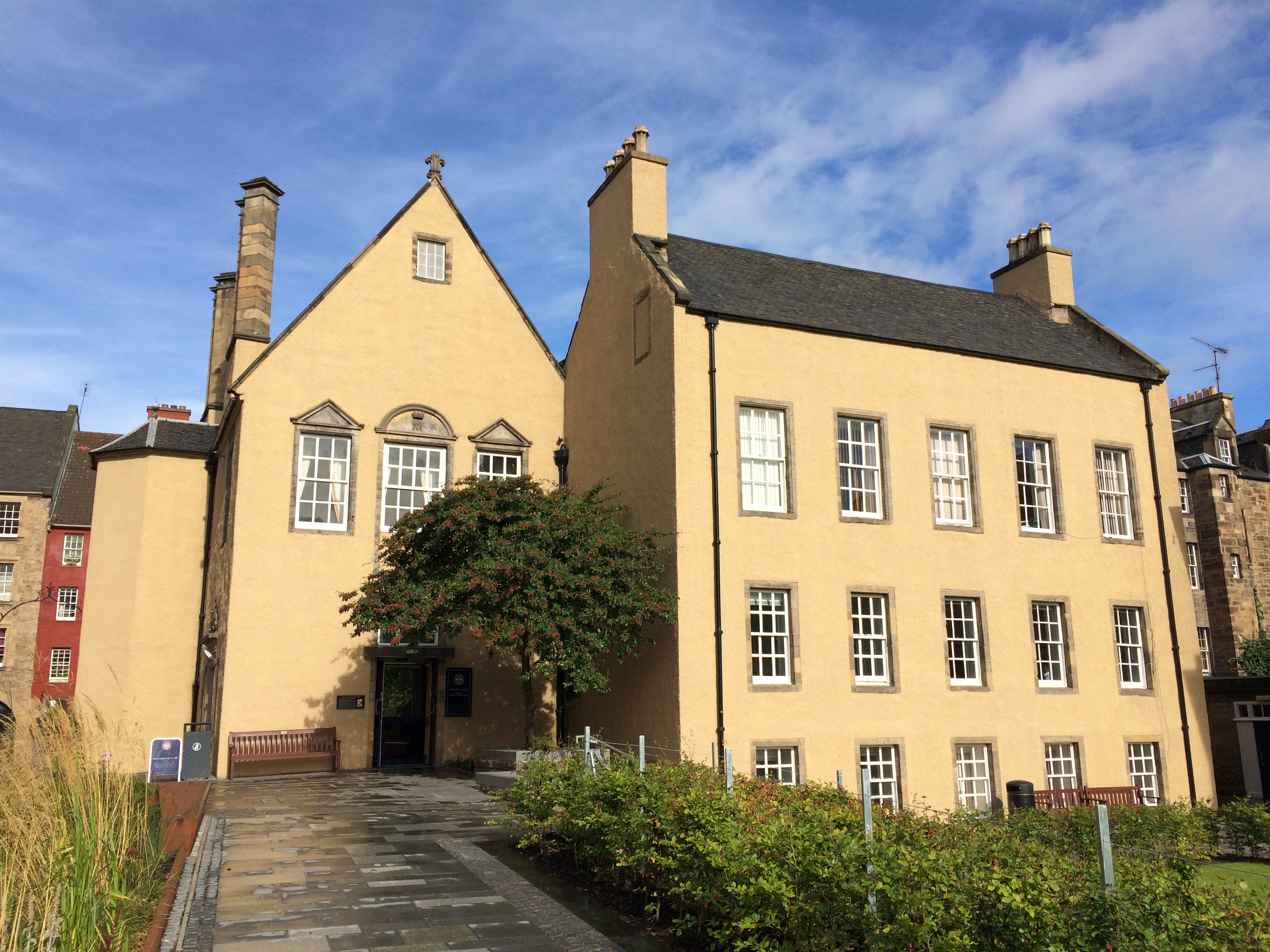
Old Moray House

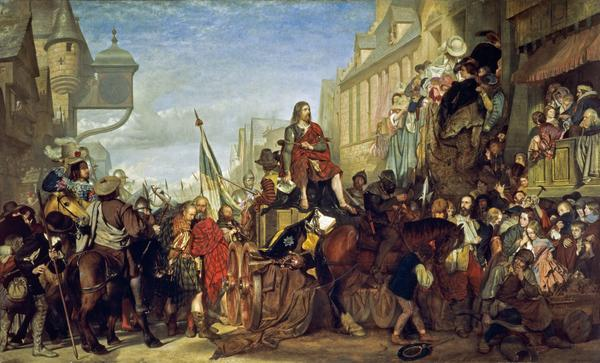
Montrose and the Campbell–Stewart wedding, by James Drummond

Old Moray House is an aristocratic mansion built after 1618. The building boasts massive obelisks flanking the gate and two very fine rooms up a turnpike stair, with elaborate original plaster ceilings and 18th Century panelling. Mary Sutton, dowager Countess of Home was the builder. Although it has been much altered by its occupants down the centuries, it remains one of the few original aristocratic houses built in the Canongate in the 16th and 17th centuries. Lady Home employed the master mason William Wallace (d. 1631).

The west wing survives with two important interiors, the "Cromwell Room" which had originally had a balcony overlooking the garden, and the "Balcony Room", identified in Lady Home's inventory as "the new rowme that hes the balconie nixt the streit." Both rooms have ceilings of early 17th-century design. The Cromwell Room has an 18th-century decorative scheme involving neoclassical Roman scenes by Roderick Chalmers and James Norie. The decoration is believed to refer to the Jacobite cause.

According to Lady Home's 1631 inventory there was a gallery room hung with 30 paintings. A suite of vaulted rooms had access to the garden, which was landscaped with terraces, mount, walks, and a wilderness. There were two summerhouses. In February 1633, the Earl of Morton obtained her permission for the house to be used by Charles I during his visit to Scotland, but the plan was cancelled by the death of her son, the Earl of Home. In May 1650, the house was used for the wedding party of Mary Stuart and Lord Lorne, and it is said that the family and Archibald Johnston watched the captive Earl of Montrose being taken up the High Street. Their encounter was depicted in 1859 by the history painter James Drummond.

In the 1650s the house was taken from Margaret Home, Countess of Moray for the use of Oliver Cromwell. In 1667, the Earl of Argyll believed that the butler was cheating the Countess and his sister ran a disreputable ale house in the property.

The current Old Moray House, developed from a group of three buildings of different ages, originally grouped around a small courtyard. The earliest building was Mary, Countess of Home's 1618 mansion. The Regent's House to the east followed, probably before 1647. Finally the New House was built to the south in 1755.

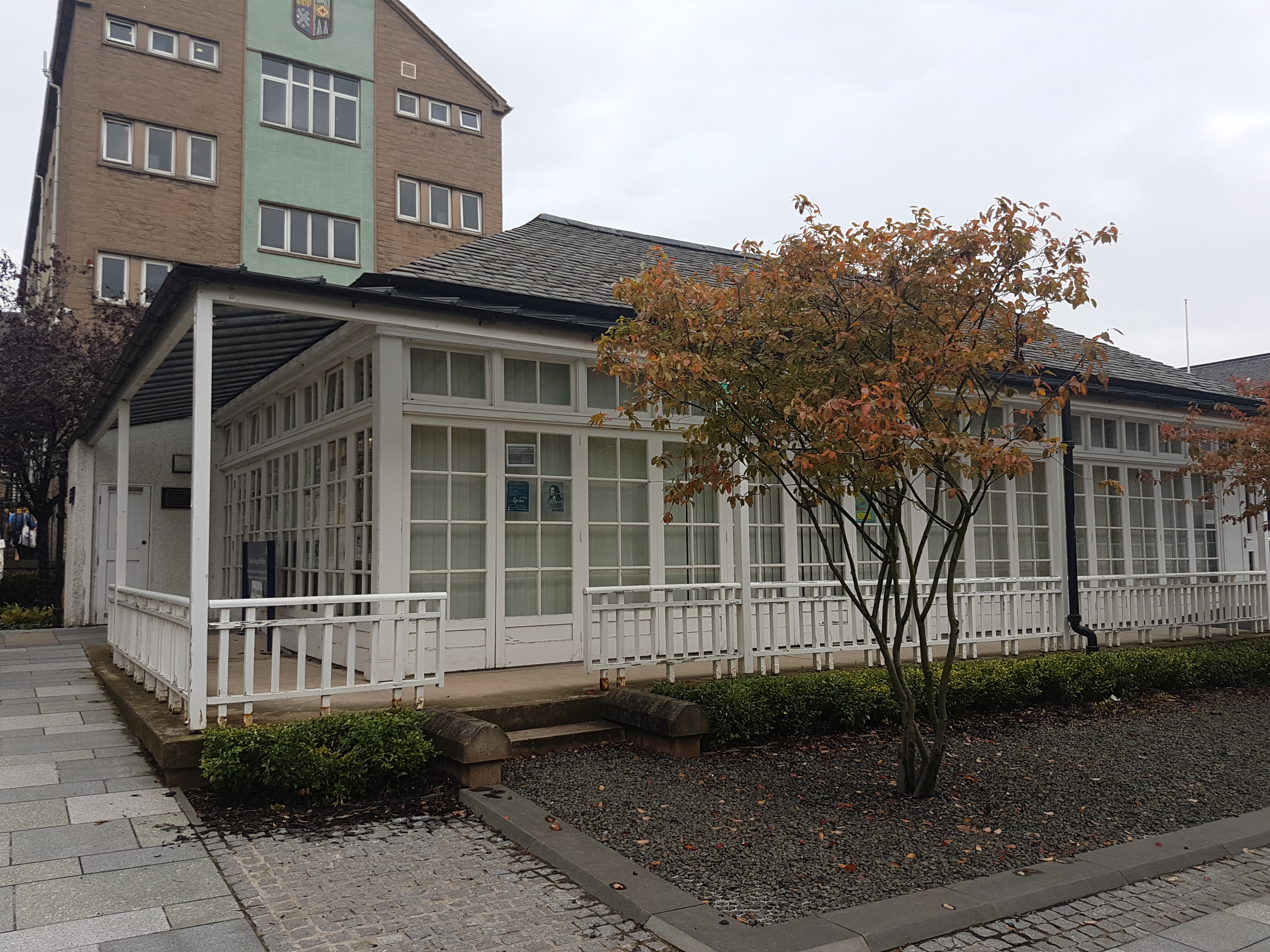
Old Nursery School on St John Street

=== Old Nursery School ===
The Old Nursery School building is currently the school reception. The building was converted to become the School Reception and Moray House College Archive in 1999 by Lewis and Hickey. As a listed building it was obliged to retain many of its original features.

Moray House Nursery School was a purpose-built Nursery School designed on Montessori principles by Frank Wood in 1932. This child-centred approach required furniture, toilets, and even coat pegs to be designed specifically for small children.

=== Paterson's Land ===
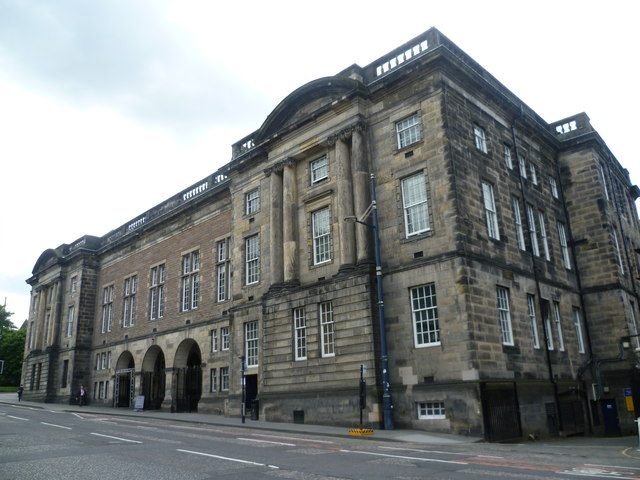
Paterson's Land from Holyrood Road.

Paterson's Land contains teaching and tutorial rooms, as well as lecture theatres. For many years it hosted Chapters restaurant but this has now closed and been replaced by Levels cafe on Holyrood Road.

Originally built as the New Training College (1911–14) off Holyrood Road by architect Alan K Robertson and designed to be a teacher-training centre for 800 students. In 1994/5 the building was renamed Paterson's Land in memory of Dr Maurice Paterson who was Rector of Moray House from 1864 -1907.

=== Simon Laurie House ===
Simon Laurie House one of the original buildings, bordering the Canongate

=== St John's Land ===
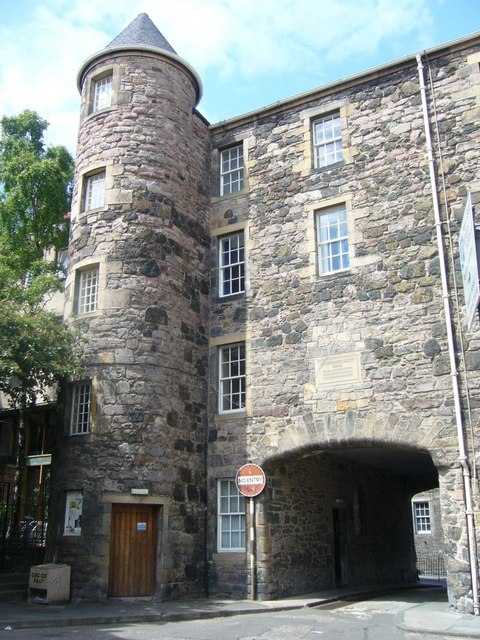
St John's Land from St John Street.

The present St John's Land was erected sometime between 1766 and 1768 by John, the second Earl of Hopetoun. It was part of his scheme which included the development of tenements along the eastern side of what is now St John Street. This was a prestigious development unusual in Edinburgh at that time consisting as it did of three or four storey tenements each with its own front door. Access to St John's Street from the Canongate was through a wide pend (1768).

By the early 1950s Moray House, through the National Committee for the Training of Teachers, owned St John's Land and the tenements along the east side of St John Street. Through the redevelopment of these sites the college was able made its own contribution to the Canongate renewal programme. The St John's Land project involved the redevelopment of the buildings at 176 - 184 Canongate and No. 1 St John's Street. The architect for the project was William Gordon Dey. Typical of restoration work at this time no attempt was made to preserve the Georgian interiors. Instead the entire building was gutted and only the existing facades and the south west turret stair were retained. The cost of the works was estimated at £41,000.

On 24 May 1956 the building was formally opened by Walter Elliot, the Lord High Commissioner to the General Assembly of the Church of Scotland. Earl Attlee, the Prime Minister of the post-war Labour government of 1945 to 1951, was also present. The then College Director of Studies, Dr W B Inglis, gave the votes of thanks.

The restored building contained studios for the teaching of Speech and Drama, staff studies and seminar rooms and a large proscenium theatre. For many years thereafter St John's Land housed in addition to Drama, the Scottish Centre for Education Overseas (SCEO) and, later, the Department for Social Science and Social Work. The Scottish Association for the Deaf used the basement as a resource and specialist equipment area. The Moray House Theatre was licensed for "public performances of plays and entertainment" and could seat an audience of up to 256.

Following the merger with the university the interior of the building was refurbished in 1998–99. The architects were Lewis and Hickey DJP. Facilities were created for the Department of Education & Society, including the Centre for Educational Sociology. These works involved the loss of the Moray House Theatre. The last student performance in the theatre, before it was cleared away, was Shakespeare's 'The Tempest'. This has the valedictory line "And now our Revels all are ended."

=== St Leonard's Land ===
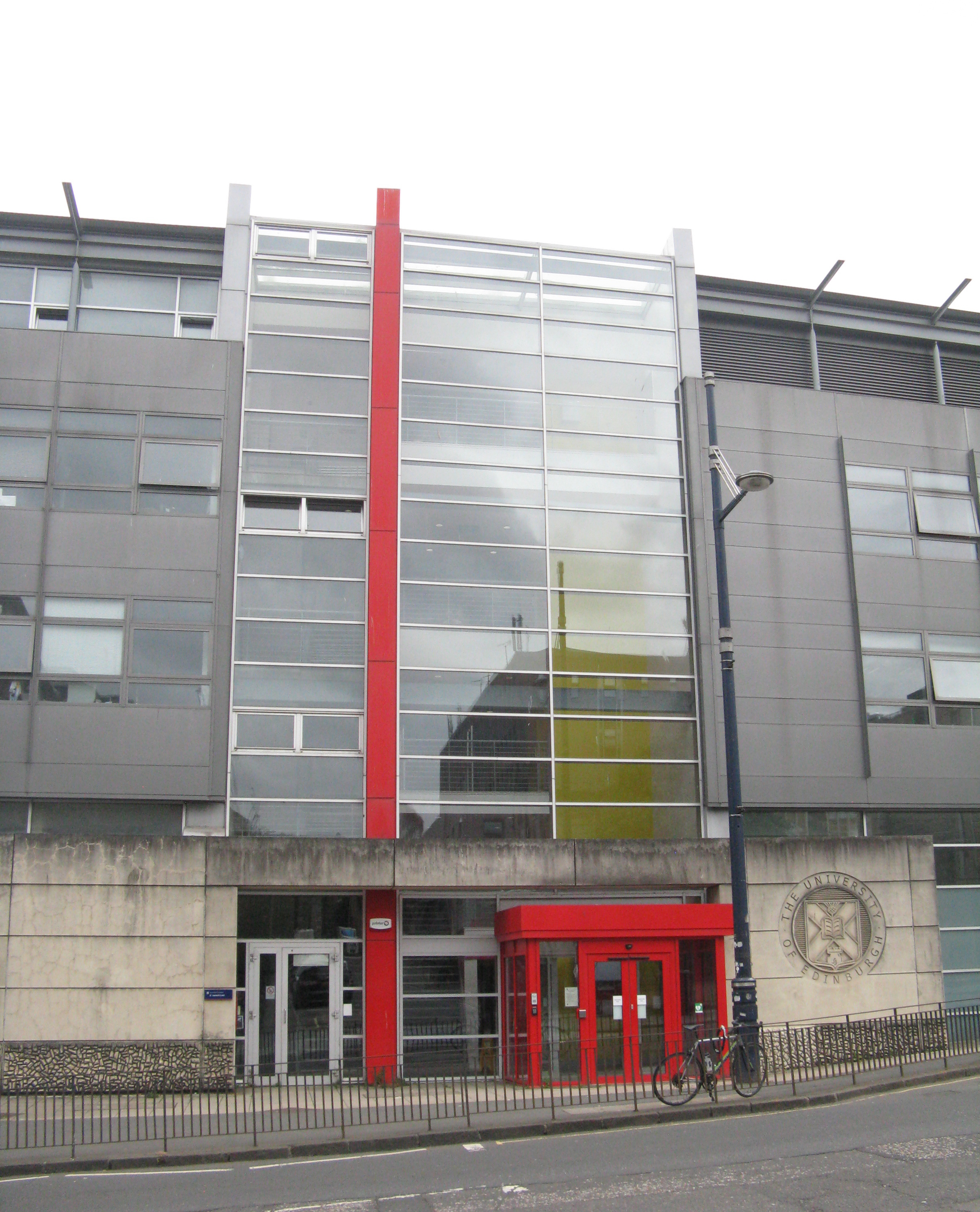
St Leonard's Land

The current St Leonard's Land was opened in October 2001, and is the newest building on the Holyrood campus. It houses the Physical Education and Sports science departments, and has a swimming pool, laboratory and gymnasia. The PE department had originally been sited on a different campus at Cramond because it did not become part of Moray House until 1987, when Moray House merged with the Dunfermline College of Physical Education. However the relocation of the Physical Education department from its Cramond campus in July 2001 necessitated the expansion and refurbishment of the existing buildings. The opportunity was taken not only to enlarge St Leonard's Land with a wrap-around academic addition to the north and east sides but to add a six-lane 25-metre research and teaching swimming pool. The architects for this project were FaulknerBrowns.

The original St Leonard's Land, now the core of the present building, was opened in 1971, and housed the original Moray House Physical Education department, which was a much smaller scale operation than before the merger with Dunfermline college.

The architects planned the original 1970s building to be unified by a concourse that spanned Holyrood Road, linking St Leonard's Land to a Library and Theatre. These in turn were supposed to connect via an elevated quadrangle with Chessel's Land and St Mary's Land. In the mid-seventies, these grandiose plans were shelved leaving St Leonard's Land somewhat isolated on the far side of a busy road.

St Leonard's Land takes its name from the neighbourhood of St Leonard's which borders Holyrood Park.

=== St Mary's Land ===
St Mary's Land was very similar to its adjoining building, Chessels's Land. It housed the Environmental Studies department as well as scientific research. St Mary's Land was demolished in 2013 in preparation for construction of new student accommodation. The University Outreach Centre, Levels Cafe, and student accommodation now stand in its place.

=== Thomson's Land ===
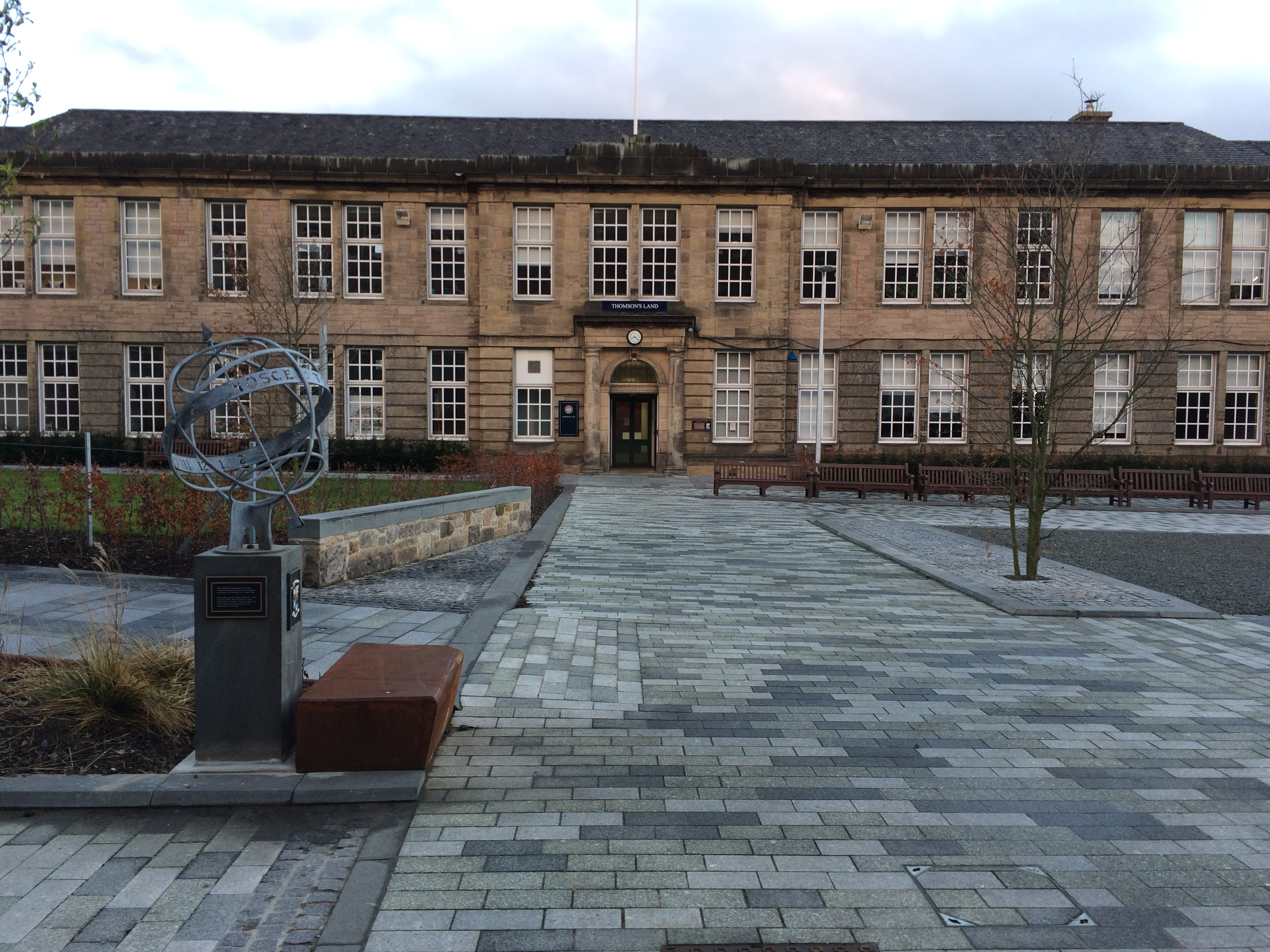
Thomson's Land

Thomson's Land - contains teaching and tutorial rooms. Originally part of the on-site school which was known as Moray House Demonstration School. The school ran in two levels. The 'A' level was a semi-private school and the 'B' level was utilised as a part of the Teachers Training College enabling trainee teachers to gain classroom experience. The original Old Building contained the Headmaster's study, administration office and science classroom The main classroom areas were in Thomson's Land. St John's land housed the Janitor's accommodation.

== Notable academics ==
- Cristina Iannelli, Professor of Education and Social Stratification

== Notable alumni ==
- Rose Ethel Bassin - musician, folklorist, biographer
- Janet S. Beck - Scottish missionary and deaconess in Malawi.
- Robbie Coltrane - actor
- Eilidh Doyle - Scottish track and field athlete
- Julie Fleeting - footballer
- Christine Grahame - Scottish politician
- David Harding - Scottish artist
- Chris Hoy - cyclist
- Margaret Macgregor - Scottish Christian missionary, Glasgow
- Sorley Maclean - poet
- Donnie Munro - Scottish musician
- Janet Pierce - painter
- Douglas Robb – headmaster
- J. K. Rowling - author of the Harry Potter series
- Jim Telfer - Scottish rugby player and coach
- Aeneas Francon Williams - missionary, chaplain, writer, poet
- David Dougal Williams - painter
