= John James Burnet =

Scottish architect (1857–1938)

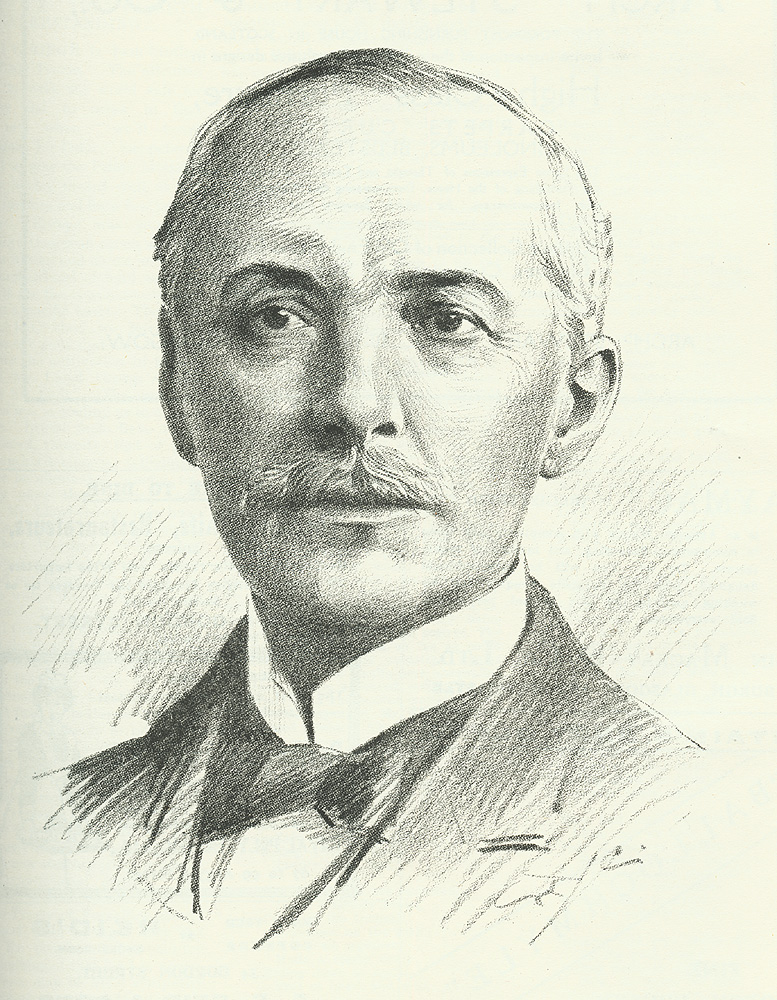
- Sir John James Burnet
- Born: 31 May 1857; Blythswood Hill, Glasgow, Scotland
- Died: 2 July 1938 (aged 81); Colinton, Edinburgh, Scotland
- Citizenship: United Kingdom
- Education: École des Beaux-Arts, Paris
- Occupation: Architect
- Awards: FRIBA; Knighthood; RSA; École des Beaux-Arts bronze medal (1914); École des Beaux-Arts gold medal (1922); Royal Gold Medal (1923 & 1938); RA (1925);
- Practice: John Burnet and Son; later Burnet, Tait & Lorne
- Buildings: Athenaeum Theatre, Glasgow (1891); King Edward VII Gallery, British Museum, London (1905); Unilever House, London (1933)
- Design: Neoclassical, Art Deco, Streamline Moderne

Sir John James Burnet FRSE FRIBA RSA RA (31 May 1857 – 2 July 1938) was a Scottish Edwardian architect who was noted for a number of prominent buildings in Glasgow and London. He was the son of the architect John Burnet, and later went into partnership with his father, joining an architectural firm which would become an influential force in British Modern architecture in the 20th century.

== Biography ==
John James Burnet was born in Blythswood Hill, Glasgow, on 31 May 1857. He was the youngest of the three sons of the architect John Burnet and his wife, Elizabeth Hay Bennet. They were a Congregationalist family. John James was educated in Glasgow at the original Collegiate School, at the Western Academy, and at Blairlodge School, Polmont.

=== Study in Paris ===
He trained for two years in his father's architectural offices. His parents intended him to study at the Royal Academy Schools under Richard Phené Spiers, but Spiers advised him instead to study at the École des Beaux-Arts in Paris. Burnet's parents were at first reluctant to send their son to a Catholic country which had been subject to the political turmoil of the Paris Commune that year, but, in 1872, he began studying under Jean-Louis Pascal, Spiers' former teacher. He progressed rapidly and in 1876, gained his Diplôme du Gouvernement in architecture and engineering. He also spent time there as an assistant to François Rolland. While studying in Pascal's atelier, Burnet forged a lifelong friendship with Henri Paul Nénot.

=== Work as an architect ===
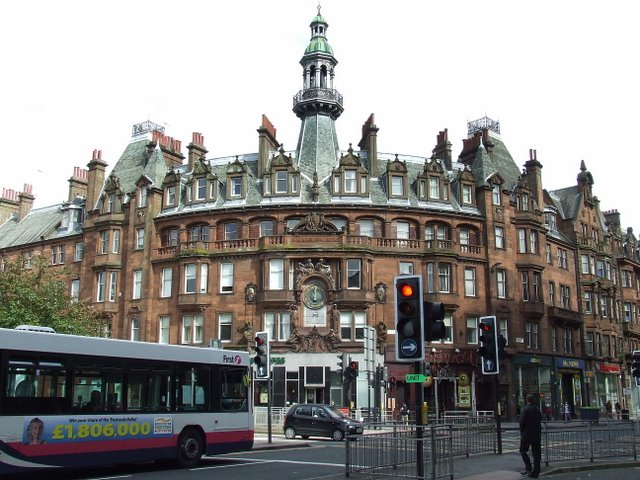
Charing Cross Mansions, Charing Cross, Glasgow (1891)

At the end of the course Burnet toured France and Italy, returning to Glasgow at the end of 1876, when he assisted his father on completing the facade of the Union Bank of Scotland building in Ingram Street. In 1878 Burnet won the competition to build the Fine Art Institute in Glasgow, his first truly independent work. The brief was to combine 'Greek with modern French Renaissance', Greek Revival architecture still being in vogue in Glasgow at the time. The building also featured friezes by John Mossman. Burnet was unsuccessful with his entry to design the Glasgow City Chambers in 1882, but his Clyde Navigation Trust building (1882–86) ensured his success through a recession.

In 1881, Burnet was admitted as an Associate of the Royal Institute of British Architects (ARIBA) and in 1882, his father, John Burnet senior, took him into partnership, and the practice was renamed John Burnet & Son. John Archibald Campbell rejoined the practice in 1886 after studying under Pascal, adding his name to the practice, Burnet Son & Campbell.

=== Burnet Baroque ===
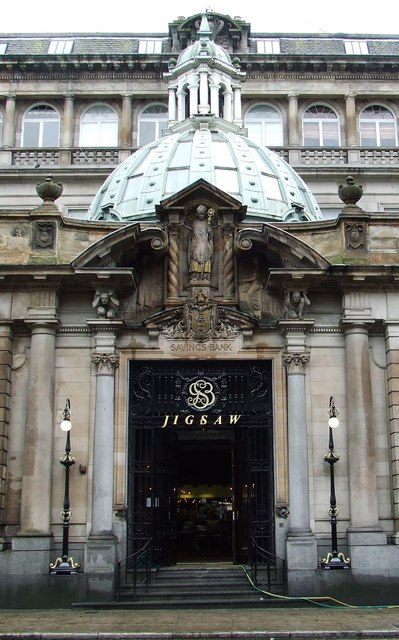
Glasgow Savings Bank, 177 Ingram Street, Glasgow (1896)

John James's father retired from the practice in 1889 or 1890 at the age of seventy-five. The younger JJ Burnet and Campbell took the practice in a more adventurous direction, looking towards the London architectural scene to keep abreast of fashion and to increase their chances of winning national competitions (which usually had London assessors). Their dramatic shift in style did not always meet with favour; designs for the competitions to build the Central Thread Agency in Glasgow and the North British Hotel in Edinburgh were rejected. Their first success in the new style was the Glasgow Athenaeum Theatre of 1891–1893, a tall American-style elevator building in a Neo-baroque style similar to that of John Belcher or Arthur Beresford Pite. JJ Burnet took a study tour of Italy in 1895 to further his understanding of Baroque architecture. "Burnet Baroque" was highly influential; their competitors quickly assimilated the new vogue for Neo-Baroque and by 1900 it was the common language of Glasgow building, and even influenced the winning design of the North British Hotel by William Hamilton Beattie. In 1896, Burnet submitted designs to the competition to build the Glasgow School of Art; he was not successful, the commission instead being handed to a flourishing young designer called Charles Rennie Mackintosh.

In 1896 the Burnets visited the US, and Burnet was greatly inspired by American architecture. He began to design a number of low-profile buildings with broad eaves, including many churches and public buildings around Scotland (such as Dundas Memorial Church, Grangemouth (1894); MacLaren Memorial Church Stenhousemuir; Public Library and Museum in Campbeltown). The inspiration of American structural techniques on Burnet's work reached a peak in 1905–1910 with his design for McGeoch's Department Store on West Campbell Street, with its strong vertical lines and the expression of the building's structure in the facade.

Burnet architectural partnerships
Dates	Practice name	Partners
1882–1886	John Burnet and Son	John Burnet, JJ Burnet
1886–1897	John Burnet, Son and Campbell	John Archibald Campbell
1897–1919	John Burnet and Son	reverted to old name after Campbell left
1918–1930	Sir John Burnet & Partners	Thomas Smith Tait and David Raeside
1919–1920 or 1921	John Burnet, Son & Partners	Thomas Harold Hughes
1921–1940	Burnet, Son & Dick	Norman Aitken
1930-c. 1949	Sir John Burnet, Tait & Lorne	JJ Burnet, Thomas Smith Tait and Francis Lorne (later also Gordon Thomas Tait)

Campbell left the partnership in 1897 with some suggestion of Campbell's problems with alcoholism, and the practice name reverted to John Burnet and Son. The same year, JJ Burnet was made a Fellow of the Royal Institute of British Architects (FRIBA) and elected President of the Glasgow Institute of Architects. In 1902, Burnet recruited a promising young architect called Thomas Smith Tait to be his assistant. Tait later became a partner in the firm and went on to be one of the most influential architects in the British Modern architecture movement.

=== British Museum ===
As partners, Burnet and Campbell never succeeded in English architectural competitions and it was only after Campbell's departure that Burnet extended the practice south of the Border. In 1903–1904 the Office of Works selected Burnet to design the Edward VII Galleries at the British Museum in London. In 1905 Burnet opened a London office in the name of John J Burnet at 1 Montague Place (a grace-and-favour house rented to him by the Museum), taking the young Tait with him. His original ambitious plans would have extended the Museum on all four sides, demolishing Bloomsbury properties to make way for a Parisian-style British Museum Avenue on a north axis, but only the Edward VII Galleries were actually built due to lack of funds. Construction lasted from 1906 to 1914; in 1910, King Edward VII died, and the Edward VII Galleries were opened by King George V and Queen Mary in 1914.

The prestigious work on the British Museum brought in new commissions for Burnet's practice: the General Buildings in Aldwych (1909–11) and the Kodak Building on Kingsway (1910–11). This latter project was a significant milestone for the firm; the American client, George Eastman, was not afraid of a modern design, and after rejecting several design proposals drawn up by Burnet, eventually selected a design submitted by Thomas S. Tait which was to serve as a model for future developments by the firm.

In 1907, draughtsman Norman Aitken Dick joined the partnership, and around this time the Glasgow office was designing some of its most prestigious and pioneering buildings, including the Alhambra Theatre Glasgow which was in the Modern Movement and an early example of a steel-framed building (which construction he employed the following year for the Kodak Building, London) and the Sick Children's Hospital at Yorkhill. Burnet continued his study visits to the United States in 1908 and 1910, looking at the design of warehouses, hospitals, museums and galleries.

Burnet was knighted in 1914 for his work in the British Museum galleries. He was also awarded the bronze medal of the Paris Salon and elected RSA. In 1921 he was made ARA in 1921 and received the Paris gold medal in 1922. Burnet helped to found the Royal Incorporation of Architects in Scotland.

=== The inter-war years ===
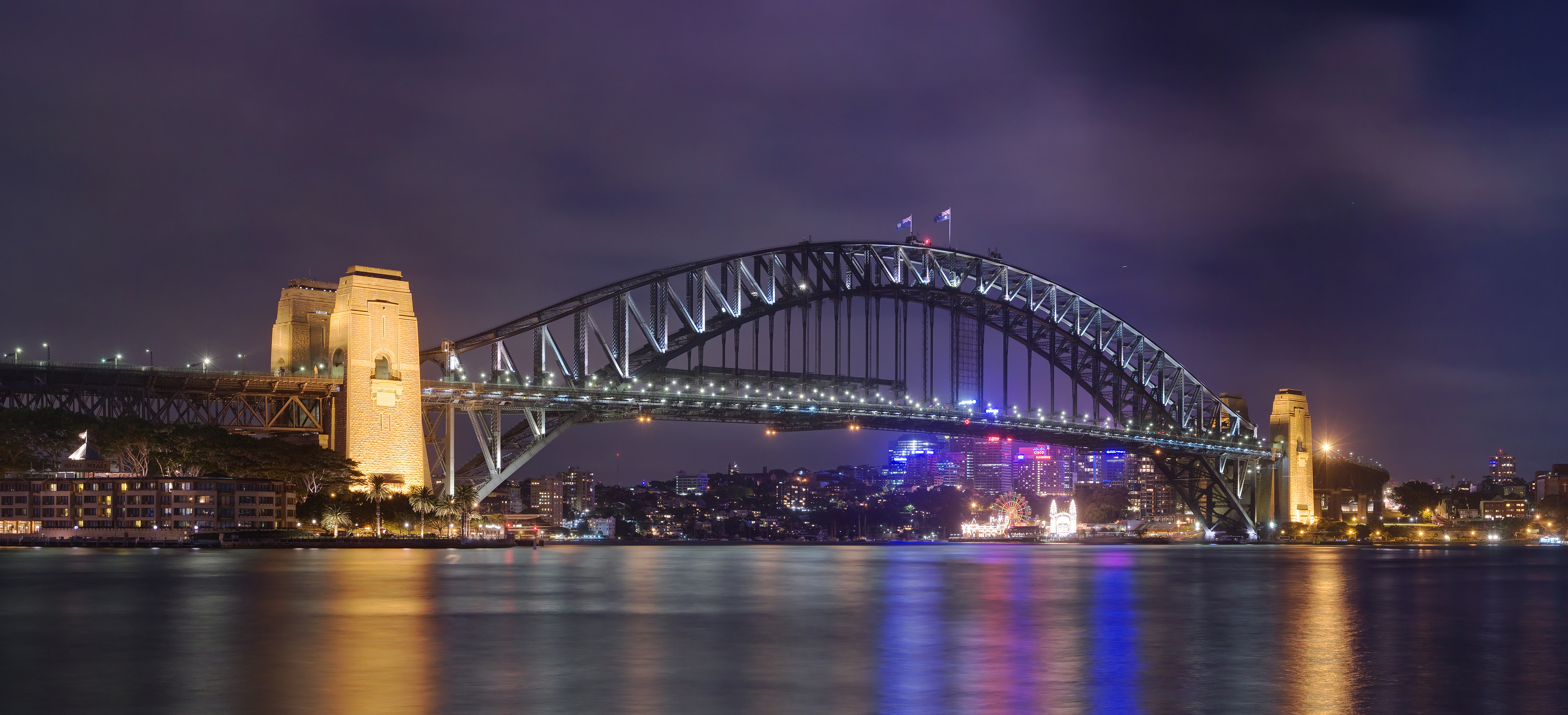
Sydney Harbour Bridge from Circular Quay

The advent of the First World War brought a time of hardship for Burnet's practice, and during this period a disagreement resulted in Tait leaving the practice to work in America. After the war, the London office began to receive commissions once more, including work on completing the Selfridges department store on Oxford Street. The Imperial War Graves Commission also commissioned war memorials from Burnet's firm in Gallipoli, Palestine and Suez (1919). Burnet took a leading role in the design of the memorials and in the work on Adelaide House, London Bridge. His health was deteriorating, however; stress-related eczema, brought on by wartime hardship, professional disagreements and financial scandals in the Glasgow office, made it hard for him to work. Thomas Tait had returned to the practice after a reconciliation, and he began to take a leading role in the practice, working on the Daily Telegraph Building and Lloyds Bank on Cornhill. Burnet himself dealt with the redesign on Lomax Simpson's Unilever House project, but otherwise acted as a consultant and went into semi-retirement.

Burnet received the Royal Gold Medal in 1923 and was elected RA in 1925.

=== Retirement and death ===
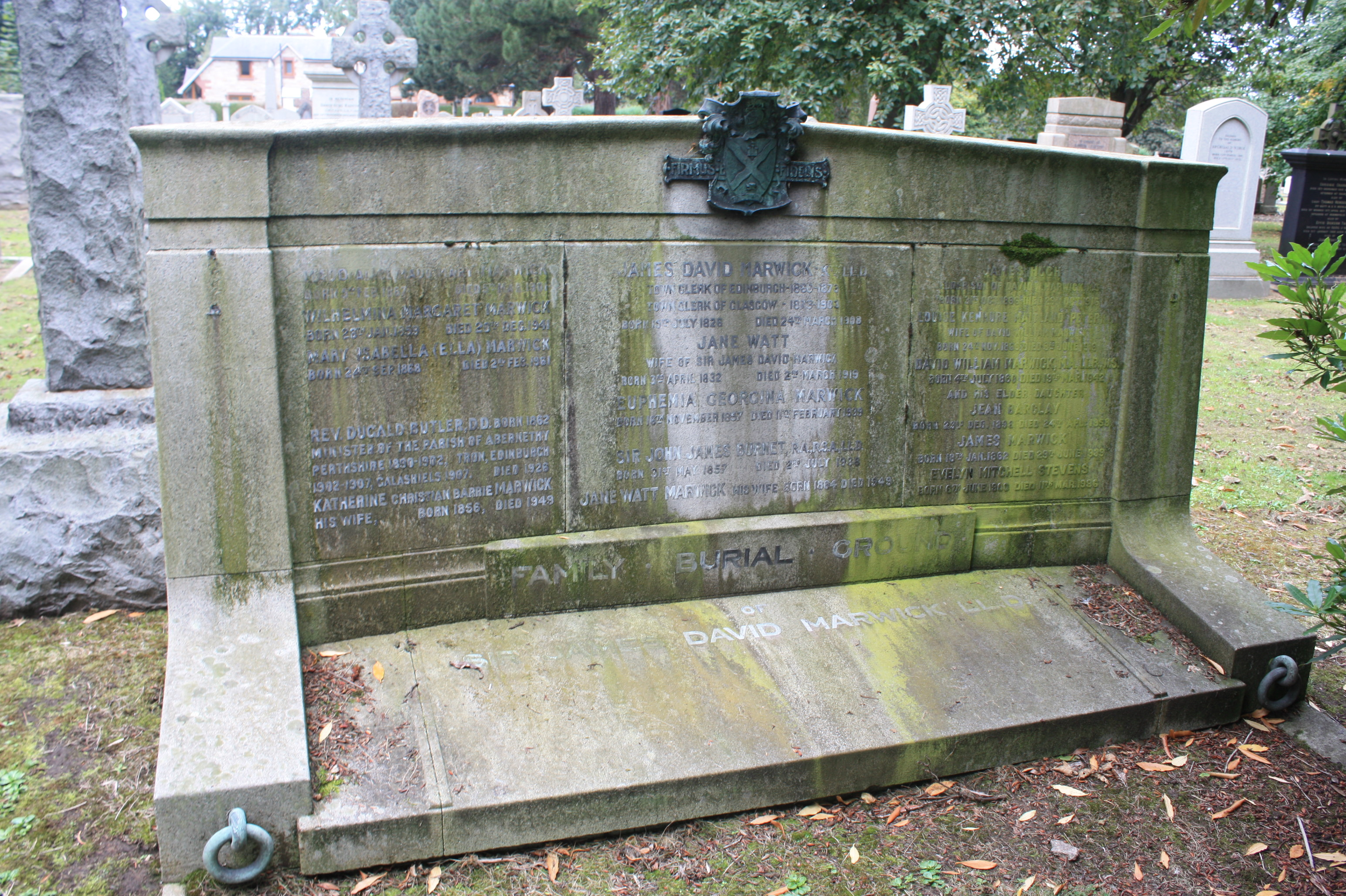
The Marwick grave, including the grave of J. J. Burnet at Warriston Cemetery

Until 1935 he lived at Killermont, his Arts and Crafts house at Rowledge, Surrey. He then purchased a much smaller cottage, Woodhall Cottage on Woodhall Road, in Colinton, Edinburgh. Although he kept in touch with developments in the Burnet Tait & Lorne office, he was unhappy in retirement. He died at home on 2 July 1938. His remains were cremated and his ashes were buried in his father-in-law's plot at Warriston Cemetery.

The Burnet Tait & Lorne practice continued to thrive after his death, and under the leadership of Thomas Smith Tait, went on to become an influential force in Modern Architecture.

== Family ==
In 1886 he was married to Jean Watt Marwick (1864–1949), daughter of Sir James David Marwick.

== Notable works ==
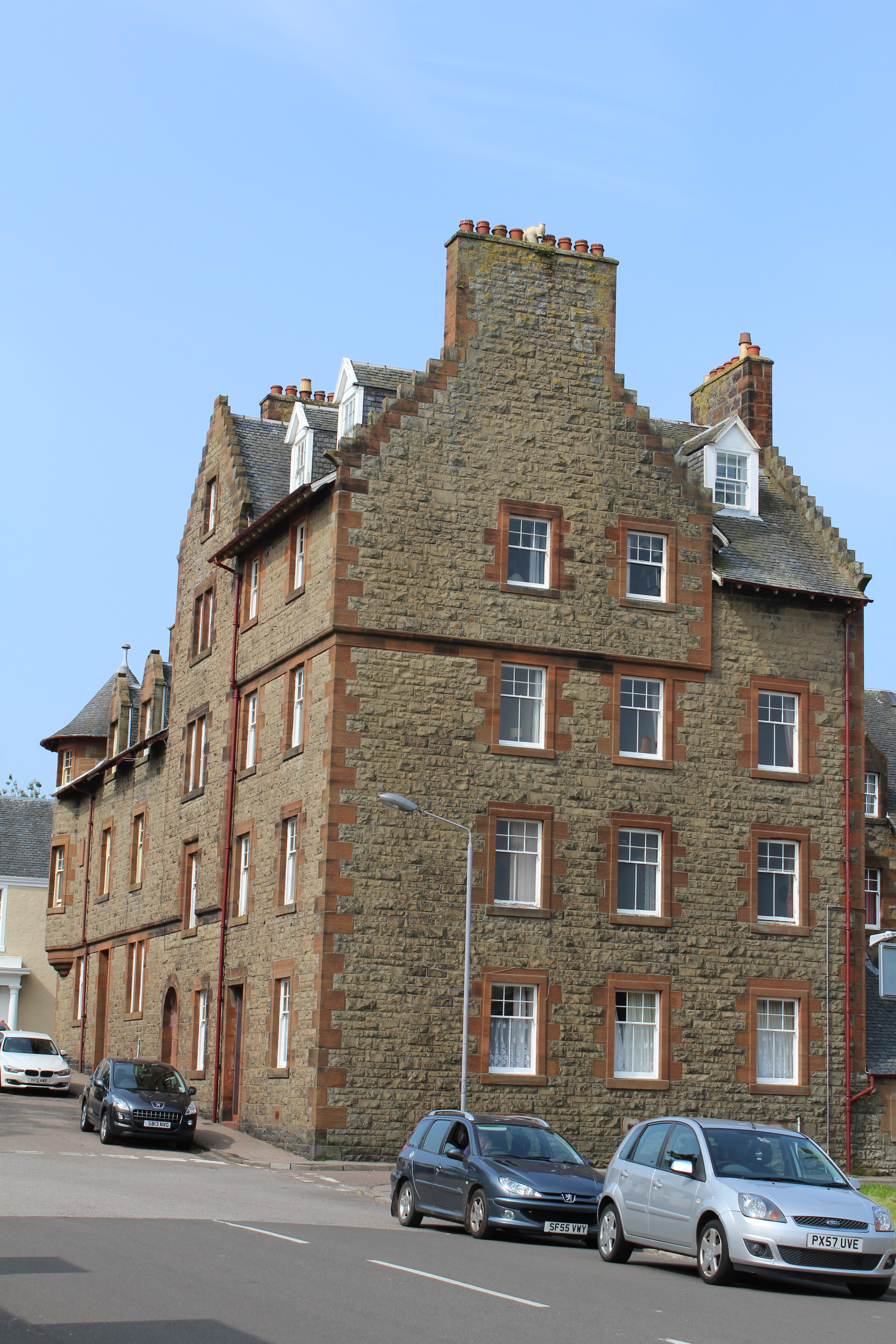
Creagdhu Mansions, New Quay Street, Campbeltown 1896

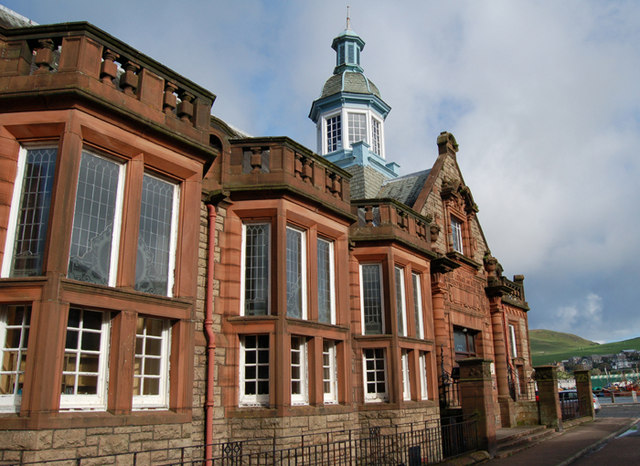
Library and Museum, Campbeltown 1897

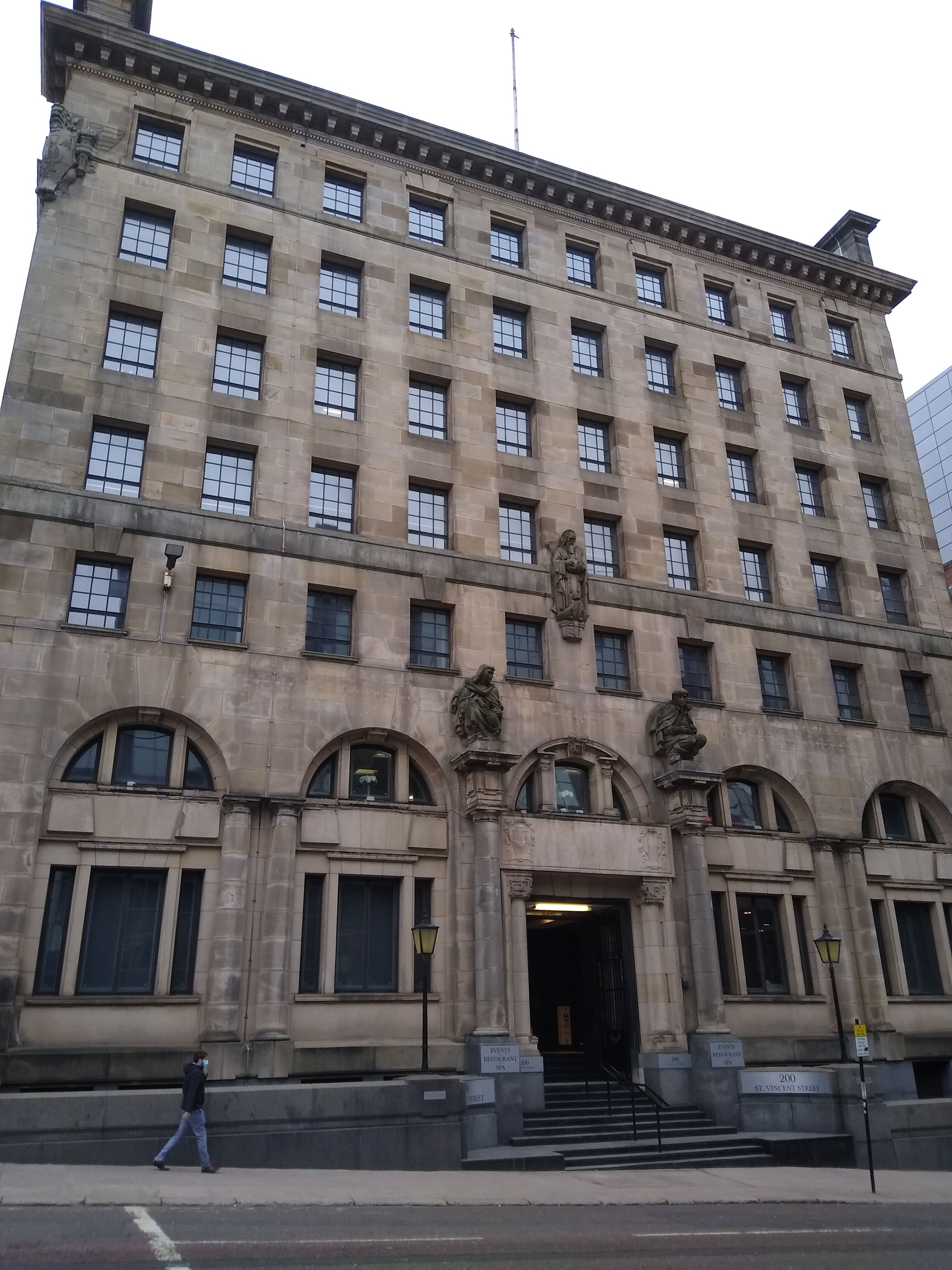
200 St Vincent Street, Glasgow 1925

Among his surviving works are:

- Remodelling of Auchterarder House (1887)
- Gardner Memorial Church, Brechin (1896)
- Clyde Navigation Trust (Clydeport) Building, Robertson Street, Glasgow (1883 and 1905)
- Barony Church, High Street, Glasgow (1886)
- John McIntyre Building, University of Glasgow (Glasgow University Union) (1886)
- Charing Cross Mansions, Charing Cross, Glasgow (1891)
- Athenaeum, 8 Nelson Mandela Place, Glasgow (1886)
- New Athenaeum Theatre, 179 Buchanan Street, Glasgow (1891)
- Royal Faculty of Physicians & Surgeons of Glasgow, St Vincent Street, Glasgow (1892)
- Campbeltown Cottage Hospital (1894)
- Glasgow Savings Bank, 177 Ingram Street, Glasgow (1896)
- Albany Chambers, Sauchiehall Street, Glasgow (1896)
- King Edward VII Gallery, British Museum, London (1905)
- RW Forsyth's Department Store, Gordon Street, Glasgow (1896 and 1906)
- Creagdhu Mansions, New Quay Street, Campbeltown (1896)
- Public Library and Museum, Campbeltown (1897-99)
- RW Forsyth's Department Store, Princes Street, Edinburgh (1906)
- Broomhill Trinity Congregational Church, Broomhill, Glasgow (1907)
- Kodak, Kingsway, London(1909)
- General Accident Assurance, Aldwych, London (1909)
- Restoration of Duart Castle, Isle of Mull (1911)
- Wallace Scott Tailoring Institute, Cathcart, Glasgow (1913)
- Royal Institute of Chemistry, London (1914)
- Lancashire Landing Commonwealth War Graves Commission Cemetery (1915)
- Balliol College Chapel, Oxford (1916)
- Selfridges Department Store, London (1919)
- Glasgow University Zoology Building (1922)
- War memorials at Gallipoli, and Jerusalem
- Glasgow Cenotaph in George Square, Glasgow (1924)
- Hunter Memorial, University of Glasgow (1924)
- Adelaide House, London Bridge Approach, London (1925)
- Daily Telegraph Building, Fleet Street, London (1925)
- North British & Mercantile Assurance, 200 St Vincent Street, Glasgow (1925)
- Lloyds Bank, Lombard Street, London (1927)
- Sydney Harbour Bridge, (1929)
- University of Glasgow Memorial Chapel (1929)
- Unilever House, Blackfriars, London (1930–33, with James Lomax-Simpson)

Other work has been destroyed or demolished, including:

- McGeoch's, West Campbell Street, Glasgow (1904)
- Kelvinside railway station, Kelvinside, Glasgow (1896)
- Alhambra Theatre, 41 Waterloo Street, Glasgow (1910)
- Royal Hospital for Sick Children, Yorkhill, Glasgow (1911)
- Port Tewfik War Memorial, Suez, Egypt
- Wemyss Bay Episcopal Church (1880, demolished 1970)

Burnet's unsuccessful competition designs for prominent building projects included:

- Glasgow Municipal Buildings (1880)
- Usher Hall, Edinburgh (1909)
- Kelvingrove Art Gallery and Museum (1891)
- Glasgow School of Art (1896)
