= Felim Egan =

Irish painter (1952–2020)

- Born: 8 November 1952; County Donegal, Ireland
- Died: 19 November 2020 (aged 68)
- Education: St Columb's College
- Occupation: Painter

Felim Egan (8 November 1952 – 19 November 2020) was an Irish painter.

== Biography ==
Born in County Donegal, Egan attended St Columb's College in Derry before studying Art in Belfast and Portsmouth and at the Slade School of Art in London. He lived and worked in Sandymount, Dublin, Ireland. He painted restrained abstracts in which ghostly squares appear to float to the edge of a monochromatic canvas. The ethereal quality of his paintings owes itself in part to his technique of building up colour by applying layer after layer of thin acrylic mixed with powdered stone.

He represented Ireland at the Paris Biennale in 1980 and the São Paulo Art Biennial in 1985. In 1993 he won the Premier UNESCO Prize for the Arts in Paris, and he received the Gold Award at Cagnes-sur-Mer in 1997. Felim Egan was a member of Aosdána. Major exhibitions of his work were held at the Whitworth Art Gallery, Manchester and the Irish Museum of Modern Art, Dublin in 1995–96, and at the Stedelijk Museum Amsterdam in 1999.

== Works in collections ==
- Fritz-Winter-Haus, Moderne Kunst Museum, Ahlen, Germany
- Ulster Museum, Belfast
- The Arts Council of Ireland
- The Arts Council of Northern Ireland
- Hugh Lane Gallery, Dublin
- University College, Dublin
- Office of Public Works, Dublin.
- Irish Museum of Modern Art, Dublin
- City Art Gallery, Edinburgh
- Trinity College, Dublin
- National Gallery of Ireland
- Metropolitan Museum of Art, New York, N.Y.
- Stedelijk Museum, Amsterdam
