= Francis Lorne =

Scottish architect

Francis Lorne (30 March 1889, Falkirk – June 1963 Harare) was a Scottish architect and partner of the prominent Sir John Burnet, Tait & Lorne architectural firm.
