= Grant baronets =

Extinct baronetcy in the Baronetage of the United Kingdom

Six baronetcies have been held by the Grant family.

== Grant baronets, of Grant (1625) ==
Grant of Grant, chiefs of Clan Grant, arms with the badge of a Baronet of Nova Scotia as heir of the Colquhoun baronetcy of 1625 (James Grant succeeded to the baronetcy c. 1718)

- Sir James Grant, 6th Baronet (1679–1747)
- Sir Ludovick Grant, 7th Baronet (1707–1773)
- Sir James Grant, 8th Baronet (1738–1811)
- Sir Ludovick Alexander Grant, 9th Baronet (1767–1840)
- Sir Francis William Ogilvy-Grant, 10th Baronet (1778–1853)
- Sir John Charles Ogilvy-Grant, 11th Baronet (1815–1881)
- Sir Ian Charles Ogilvy-Grant, 12th Baronet (1851–1884)
- Sir James Ogilvy-Grant, 13th Baronet (1817–1888)
- Sir Francis Ogilvy-Grant, 14th Baronet (1847–1888)
- Sir James Ogilvy-Grant, 15th Baronet (1876–1915)
- Sir Trevor Ogilvy-Grant, 16th Baronet (1879–1948)
- Sir (Donald) Patrick Trevor Grant, 17th Baronet (1912–1992)
- Sir James Patrick Trevor Grant, 18th Baronet (1943–2023)
- Sir Michael Patrick Grant, 19th Baronet (born 1953)

== Grant baronets, of Dalvey, Elgin (1688) ==
Created 10 August 1688, in the baronetage of Nova Scotia.

- Sir James Grant, 1st Baronet, died 1695
- Sir Ludovic Grant, 2nd Baronet, died 4 January 1701
- Sir Sweton Grant, 3rd Baronet, died 1752
- Sir Patrick Grant, 4th Baronet, born c. 1655, died 10 April 1755
- Sir Alexander Grant, 5th Baronet (1705–1772), was member of parliament for Inverness (1761–1768)
- Sir Ludovic Grant, 6th Baronet, died 17 September 1790
- Sir Alexander Grant, 7th Baronet, born c. 1750, died 26 July 1825
- Sir Alexander Cray Grant, 8th Baronet, born 30 November 1782, died 29 November 1854, was member of parliament for Tregony 1812–1818, Lostwithiel 1818–1826, Aldborough 1826–1830, Westbury 1830–1831 and Cambridge 1840 and again 1841–1843
- Sir Robert Innes Grant, 9th Baronet, born 8 April 1794, died 1 August 1856
- Sir Alexander Grant, 10th Baronet, born 23 September 1826, died 30 November 1884
- Sir Ludovic James Grant, 11th Baronet, born 4 September 1862, died 11 February 1936
- Sir Hamilton Grant, 12th Baronet, born 12 June 1872, died 23 January 1937
- Sir Duncan Alexander Grant, 13th Baronet, born 16 December 1928, died 25 March 1961
- Sir Patrick Alexander Benedict Grant, 14th Baronet, born 5 February 1953

The heir apparent is the present holder's eldest son Duncan Archibald Ludovic Grant, born 19 April 1982.

== Grant baronets, of Monymusk, Aberdeen (1705) ==
Created 7 December 1705, in the baronetage of Nova Scotia.

- Sir Francis Grant, 1st Baronet, born 1658, died 23 March 1726
- Sir Archibald Grant, 2nd Baronet, born 25 September 1696, died 17 September 1778, was member of parliament for Aberdeenshire 1722–1732
- Sir Archibald Grant, 3rd Baronet, born 17 February 1731, died 30 September 1796
- Sir Archibald Grant, 4th Baronet, born 7 May 1760, died 17 April 1820
- Sir James Grant, 5th Baronet, born 17 February 1791, died 30 August 1859
- Sir Isaac Grant, 6th Baronet, born 5 July 1792, died 19 July 1863
- Sir Archibald Grant, 7th Baronet, born 21 September 1823, died 5 September 1884
- Sir Francis William Grant, 8th Baronet, born 10 February 1828, died 13 December 1887
- Sir Arthur Henry Grant, 9th Baronet, born 24 April 1849, died 1 March 1917
- Sir Arthur Grant, 10th Baronet, born 14 September 1879, died 21 June 1931
- Sir Arthur Lindsay Grant, 11th Baronet, born 8 September 1911, died 18 July 1944, m. Priscilla Buchan, Baroness Tweedsmuir
- Sir Francis Cullen Grant, 12th Baronet, born 5 October 1914, died 31 August 1966
- Sir Archibald Grant, 13th Baronet, born 2 September 1954

The heir presumptive is the present holder's nephew Alexander William Grant, born 28 November 1996.

== Grant baronets, of Forres, Moray (1924) ==
Created 25 June 1924, in the baronetage of the United Kingdom.

- Sir Alexander Grant, 1st Baronet, born 1 October 1864, died 21 May 1937
- Sir Robert McVitie Grant, 2nd Baronet, born 7 December 1894, died 26 January 1947, when the baronetcy became extinct due to no heir.

== Grant baronet, of Househill, Nairn (1926) ==
Created 30 July 1926, a baronetage of the United Kingdom.

- Sir James Augustus Grant, 1st Baronet, born 3 March 1867, was member of parliament for Egremont 1910–1918, for Whitehaven 1918–1922, and Derbyshire South 1924–1929. He had no son and died on 29 July 1932, when the title became extinct.

== Macpherson-Grant baronets, of Ballindalloch (1838) ==
- See Macpherson-Grant baronets
