= Ogilvie-Grant =

Ogilvie-Grant or Ogilvy-Grant are surnames. Notable people with the surname include:

- Francis Ogilvy-Grant, 6th Earl of Seafield (1778–1853), Scottish nobleman and Member of Parliament
- Francis William Ogilvy-Grant, 10th Earl of Seafield (1847–1888), Scottish peer
- Ian Ogilvy-Grant, 8th Earl of Seafield (1851–1884), Scottish peer
- James Ogilvy-Grant, 9th Earl of Seafield (1817–1888), Scottish peer and Member of Parliament
- James Ogilvie-Grant, 11th Earl of Seafield (1876–1915), Scottish nobleman
- John Ogilvy-Grant, 7th Earl of Seafield (1815–1881), Scottish nobleman
- Trevor Ogilvie-Grant, 4th Baron Strathspey (1879–1948), Scottish peer
- William Robert Ogilvie-Grant (1863–1924), Scottish ornithologist
