= James Ogilvie-Grant =

James Ogilvie-Grant may refer to:

- James Ogilvie-Grant, 11th Earl of Seafield (1876–1915), Scottish peer and soldier
- James Ogilvie-Grant, 9th Earl of Seafield (1817–1888), Scottish peer and politician
