= Barlaston Hall =

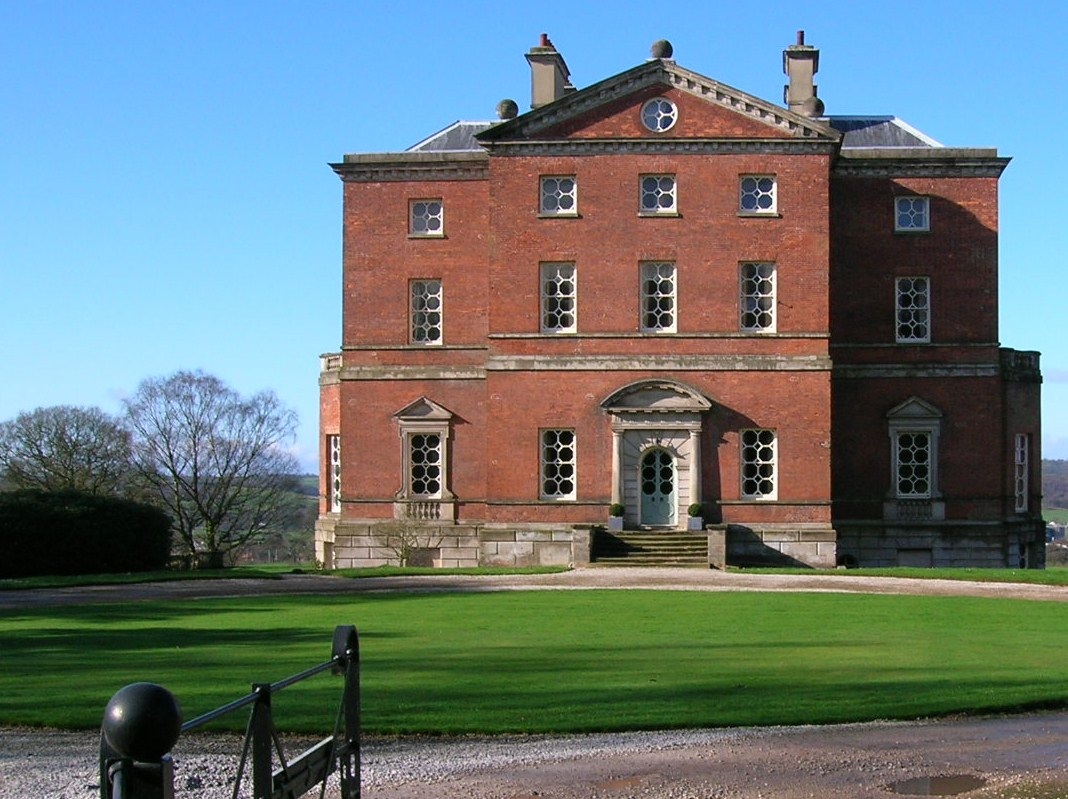

- Location within Staffordshire
- 52.9493°N 2.1587°W
- Location: Staffordshire, England
- OS grid reference: SJ8944239114

History
- Built: c. 1730

Site notes
- Architect: Robert Taylor
- Architectural style: Palladian
- Restored: c. 1990
- Restored by: Save Britain's Heritage, Kit Martin, Bob Weighton, and James and Carol Hall

Listed Building – Grade I
- Designated: 10 January 1953
- Reference no.: 1374172

Barlaston Hall is an English Palladian country house in the village of Barlaston in Staffordshire, on a ridge overlooking the valley of the River Trent to the west, about 5 miles (8.0 km) south of Stoke-on-Trent, with the towns of Stone about 4 miles (6.4 km) to the south, and Stafford about 11 miles (18 km) south (grid reference SJ894391).

It was bought by the Wedgwood pottery company in 1937, but disrepair and subsidence due to coal mining brought the hall close to demolition in the early 1980s. It was bought for £1 by a trust set up by Save Britain's Heritage and restored. It has returned to use as a private residence. The hall is a Grade I listed building.

== History ==
Barlaston Hall was probably designed by architect Sir Robert Taylor for Thomas Mills, an attorney from Leek, in 1756–58, to replace the existing manor house that he had acquired through marriage. The hall has a red-brick exterior, and is one of a few of Taylor's buildings which retain his trademark octagonal and diamond glazing in the sash windows.

From the entrance court, a flight from steps leads up to a central doorway with pilasters and segmental pediment. The doorway provides access to a central Doric hall which opens on to two of the three main reception rooms and an inner hall with domed skylight containing a cantilevered staircase leading to a galleried landing on the first floor, and further stairs giving access to the second upper floor and attic. Services are within a lower ground floor or basement level. The gardens and grounds of about 4.5 acres (1.8 ha) were landscaped by William Sawrey Gilpin. The house is located beside the parish church of St John the Baptist (now deconsecrated).

The hall came into the Adderley family in 1816 when Rosamund Mills, co-heiress of the Barlaston estate, married Ralph Adderley of Coton Hall, Hanbury, Staffordshire. Their son Ralph Thomas Adderley was High Sheriff of Staffordshire in 1866.

Following his death in 1931 the 380-acre (1.5 km^{2}) estate was put up for sale and was bought by the Wedgwood pottery company in 1937, as a site to replace its operation in Etruria a few miles away in an industrial part of Stoke-on-Trent. A new electric pottery and model village for its employees were built in the grounds. From 1945 the hall housed the Wedgwood Memorial College, but when the building was found to contain dry rot, they left and moved elsewhere in the village. Wedgwood continued to maintain the Hall until the late 1960s after which the hall was vandalised and lead removed from the roof. It also suffered major subsidence due to coal mining. The house had been built across a geological fault, and 4-inch (100 mm) wide cracks had opened in its walls.

== Restoration ==
By the early 1980s, the hall was in a parlous state of decay, with few repairs for many years, water ingress, and a serious threat of subsidence having been undermined by coal workings. Floorboards had been removed, most of the staircase had collapsed, and ceilings and plasterwork had fallen through to the basement. Wedgwood made two applications to have the Grade I listed building demolished, and a public inquiry was convened. Save Britain's Heritage, with Kit Martin, architect Bob Weighton and engineering firm Peter Dann & Partners, formulated a plan to restore and protect the house. The National Coal Board said that it would pay for the subsidence damage and preventative works to construct a raft under the building, so, early on 29 September 1981, Wedgwood offered to sell Barlaston Hall to Save Britain's Heritage for £1, on condition that the restoration was completed within five years, in default of which Wedgwood retained an option to repurchase the hall for £1.

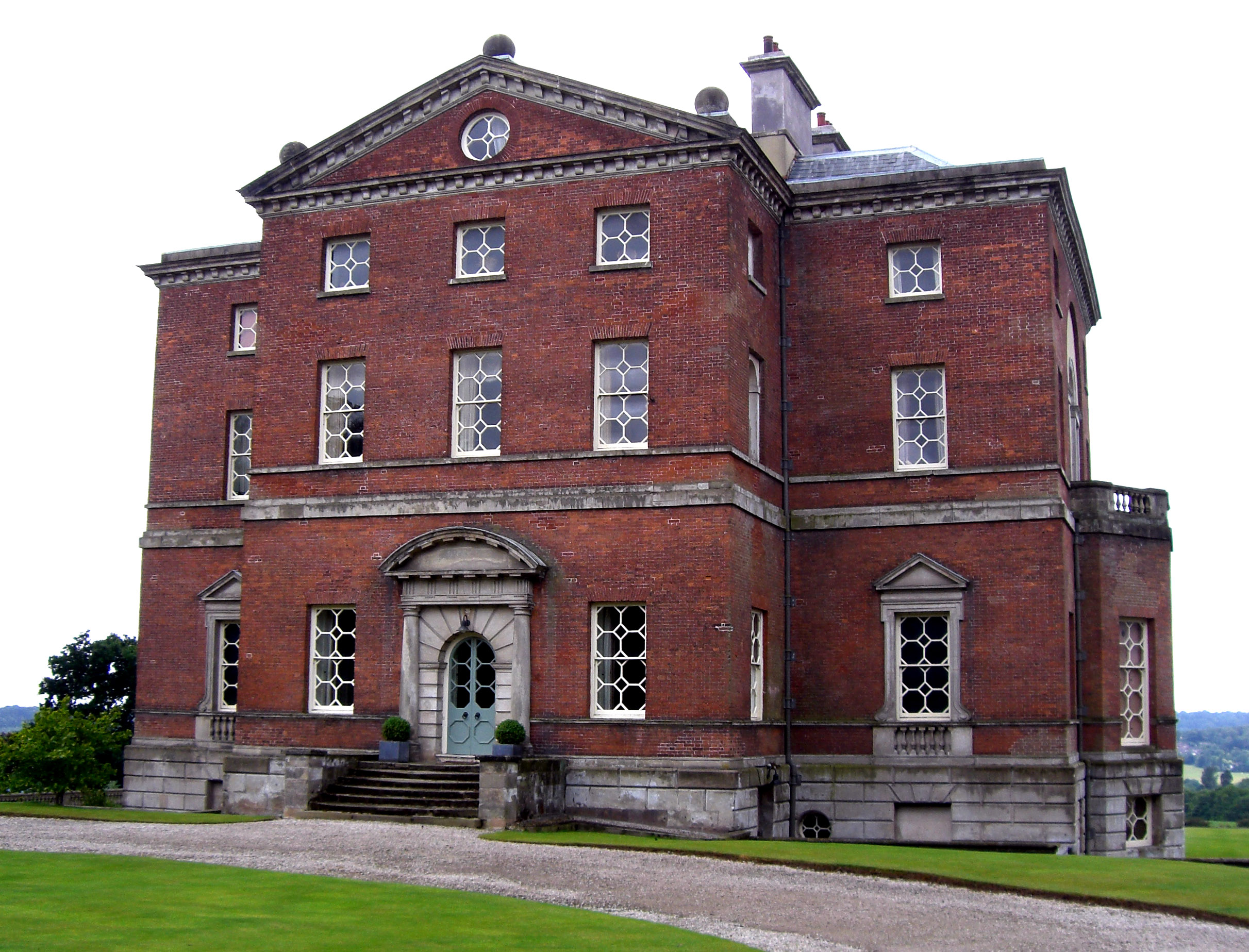
Barlaston Hall in 2008

An independent trust was established to restore the house, starting with repairs to the roof. However, the NCB reneged on the undertaking it had given at the public inquiry to pay for repairs to past subsidence damage, and for other preventative works, and offered £25,000 compensation under the Coal Act instead. Save applied for judicial review against the NCB and the Secretary of State for the Environment, whose delayed certification was behind the NCB's change of view. The certificates were quickly issued, forcing the hand of the NCB, which eventually agreed to pay £120,000 in compensation, to fund preventative works, and meet the legal costs. Wedgwood also extended the original 5-year restoration period by a further 3 years. Grants from English Heritage, the Historic Buildings Council, the Manifold Trust and a loan from the National Heritage Memorial Fund, allowed the external restoration to be largely completed in the early 1990s. This involved extensive works including inserting a concrete raft under the building to protect against further mining subsidence.

In 1992 Save Britain's Heritage decided to sell the hall before the internal restoration had been started. It was bought by James and Carol Hall who completed the internal restoration over a period of more than five years. This included new internal walls, ceilings, plasterwork and staircases. Much of the work was done by craftsmen who had developed their skills on the earlier restoration of Uppark. In 2015, Barlaston Hall was on the market with a guide price of £2.3 million; and again in 2025, with a guide price of £2.9 million.

== See also ==
- List of Grade I listed buildings in Staffordshire
