= Francis Ogilvy-Grant =

Francis Ogilvy-Grant may refer to:

- Francis Ogilvy-Grant, 6th Earl of Seafield, Scottish nobleman and politician
- Francis Ogilvy-Grant, 10th Earl of Seafield, Scottish peer
