= Baron Strathspey =

Extinct barony in the Peerage of the United Kingdom

Coat of arms of Lord Strathspey with the badge of a Baronet of Nova Scotia as heir of the Colquhoun baronetcy of 1625.

Baron Strathspey, of Strathspey in the Counties of Inverness and Moray, is a title that has been created twice, both times in the Peerage of the United Kingdom. On each occasion, the barony was created for an Earl of Seafield.

== History ==
=== Barons Strathspey, first creation (1858) ===
It was created for the first time on 14 August 1858 for John Ogilvy-Grant, 7th Earl of Seafield (see the Earl of Seafield for earlier history of this title). This creation became extinct on the death of his son, the eighth Earl and second Baron, in 1884.

=== Barons Strathspey, second creation (1884) ===
The barony was revived only a few months after it first became extinct in favour of the late Earl's uncle, James Ogilvy-Grant, 9th Earl of Seafield (who had also succeeded him in the baronetcy of Colquhoun; see Colquhoun baronets for earlier history of this title). The barony and baronetcy remained subsidiary titles of the earldom until the death of the ninth Earl's grandson, the eleventh Earl, in 1915. The earldom, which could be passed on to female heirs, was inherited by the Earl's daughter and only child, the twelfth Countess (see the Earl of Seafield for later history of the earldom).

The baronetcy and barony of Strathspey, which could only be inherited by males, were passed on to the Earl's brother, the fourth Baron. His son, the fifth Baron, was confirmed in the surname of Grant of Grant by decree of the Lord Lyon in 1950. As of 2023 the titles are held by the latter's younger son, the seventh Baron, who succeeded in 2023. His is the 34th Chief of Clan Grant.

== List of title holders ==
=== Barons Strathspey (1858) ===
- John Charles Ogilvy-Grant, 7th Earl of Seafield, 1st Baron Strathspey (1815–1881)
- Ian Charles Ogilvy-Grant, 8th Earl of Seafield, 2nd Baron Strathspey (1851–1884)

=== Barons Strathspey (1884) ===
- James Ogilvy-Grant, 9th Earl of Seafield, 1st Baron Strathspey (1817–1888)
- Francis William Ogilvy-Grant, 10th Earl of Seafield, 2nd Baron Strathspey (1847–1888)
- James Ogilvy-Grant, 11th Earl of Seafield, 3rd Baron Strathspey (1876–1915)
- Trevor Ogilvy-Grant, 4th Baron Strathspey (1879–1948)
- Donald Patrick Trevor Grant of Grant, 5th Baron Strathspey (1912–1992)
- James Patrick Trevor Grant of Grant, 6th Baron Strathspey (1943–2023)
- Michael Patrick Grant, 7th Baron Strathspey (born 1953)

There is no heir to the barony.

Family tree of the Barons Strathspey with relation to Earls of Seafield
- Colonel Francis William Ogilvy-Grant, 6th Earl of Seafield (1778—1853)
  - John Charles Ogilvy-Grant, 7th Earl of Seafield, 1st Baron Strathspey (1815—1881)
    - Ian Charles Ogilvy-Grant, 8th Earl of Seafield, 2nd Baron Strathspey (1851—1884)
  - Lt.-Col. James Ogilvy-Grant, 9th Earl of Seafield, 1st Baron Strathspey (1817—1888)
    - Francis William Ogilvy-Grant, 10th Earl of Seafield, 2nd Baron Strathspey (1847—1888)
      - James Ogilvie-Grant, 11th Earl of Seafield, 3rd Baron Strathspey (1876—1915)
        - Nina Caroline Ogilvie-Grant, 12th Countess of Seafield (1906—1969)
          - Ian Derek Francis Ogilvie-Grant, 13th Earl of Seafield (b. 1939)
      - Trevor Ogilvie-Grant, 4th Baron Strathspey (1879—1948)
        - Lt.-Col. Donald Patrick Trevor Grant, 5th Baron Strathspey (1912—1992)
          - James Patrick Trevor Grant, 6th Baron Strathspey (1943—2023)
          - Michael Patrick Francis Grant, 7th Baron Strathspey (b. 1953)

== See also ==
- Clan Grant
- Colquhoun baronets
- Earl of Seafield
