= Cullen House =

Large house in Moray, Scotland

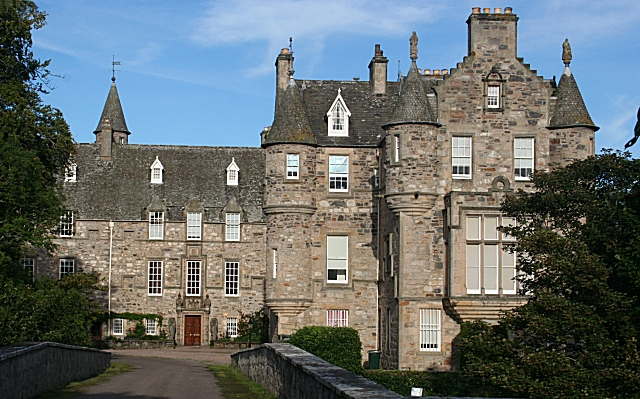
- Cullen House, viewed from the west

- Location within Moray

General information
- Architectural style: Scottish baronial revival, (older features remain)
- Location: Cullen, Moray, Scotland
- Coordinates: 57°41′01″N 2°49′45″W
- Construction started: 20 March 1600

Design and construction
- Architects: Alexander McGill; James Smith; William Adam; James Adam; John Adam; James Playfair; John Baxter; David Bryce; Robert Lorimer; Kit Martin
- Designations: Category A listed building

Inventory of Gardens and Designed Landscapes in Scotland
- Official name: Cullen House
- Designated: 30 June 1987
- Reference no.: GDL00121

Cullen House is a property, about 1 kilometre (0.6 mi) south-west of the coastal town of Cullen in Moray, Scotland. It was the seat of the Ogilvies of Findlater, who went on to become the Earls of Findlater and Seafield, and it remained in their family until 1982. Building work started on the house in 1600, incorporating some of the stonework of an earlier building on the site. The house has been extended and remodelled several times by prominent architects such as James Adam, John Adam, and David Bryce. It has been described by the architectural historian Charles McKean as "one of the grandest houses in Scotland" and is designated a Category A listed building. The grounds were enlarged in the 1820s when the entire village of Cullen, save for Cullen Old Church, was demolished to make way for improvements to the grounds by Lewis Ogilvie-Grant, 5th Earl of Seafield; a new village, closer to the coast, was constructed for the inhabitants. Within the grounds are a bridge, a rotunda and a gatehouse, each of which is individually listed as a Category A structure.

Twice in its history, the house has been captured and ransacked. It was taken by forces acting under the orders of the Marquess of Montrose in 1645 during the Wars of the Three Kingdoms. It was attacked again by a group of Jacobites during the rising of 1745, shortly before they were defeated at the Battle of Culloden.

Cullen House was inherited by Nina Ogilvie-Grant-Studley-Herbert, the 12th Countess of Seafield, in 1915. She did not use it as her primary residence, nor did her son Ian Ogilvie-Grant, who inherited it on her death in 1969. By the time it was designated a listed building three years later it had become dilapidated, and its contents were auctioned off shortly afterwards. In 1982, it was purchased by Kit Martin, a specialist in saving historic buildings. Martin worked with the local architect Douglas Forrest to convert the house into fourteen individual dwellings, retaining much of the original interior of the building. The house was badly damaged by fire in 1987, after which it underwent an extensive two-year programme of restoration. The subdivided house is still in use today as domestic accommodation.

== History ==
=== Initial construction ===
Set on a clifftop above the Cullen Burn, (Note: A burn is a large stream or small river. For more information, see Burn (landform).) Cullen House was built by the Ogilvies of Findlater, whose seat had previously been at Findlater Castle on the coast about 3.6 kilometres (2.2 mi) to the east. In 1482, the Ogilvies were granted the lands of Findochty and Seafield, and by 1543 they changed their patronage from the parish church at Fordyce to Cullen Old Church, which they helped to elevate to the status of a collegiate church. (Note: In 1543, Cullen Old Church was elevated from a parochial to a collegiate church, one of 38 such churches in Scotland at the time. This was led by Alexander Ogilvy of Findlater; Alexander Dick, Archdeacon of Glasgow; John Duff of Muldavit; and the parishioners of Cullen. As a collegiate church, it had six prebendaries, and two choristers to sing daily masses.) Buildings from around this time, which served as accommodation for the church's canons, stood on the site of the current house. These probably incorporated some of the stonework of an earlier medieval building on the site, known as Inverculain, which is mentioned in records of 1264, and is thought to have been home to Marjorie, Countess of Carrick, the mother of Robert the Bruce.

On 20 March 1600, building upon some of the structure of the canons' lodgings, work was started on a large new L-plan tower house for the laird, Sir Walter Ogilvy, and his wife Dame Margaret Drummond. The family continued to prosper: in 1616, Walter Ogilvy was created Lord Ogilvy of Deskford, his son James was further elevated to become the first Earl of Findlater in 1638.

The house was nearly destroyed in 1645 during the Wars of the Three Kingdoms, when it was captured by the Farquharsons of Braemar acting on the orders of the Marquess of Montrose. It was thoroughly plundered, and would have been burned down had the Countess of Findlater not paid Montrose a large ransom.

=== Extension, modification and Jacobite assault ===
Arms of the Earl of Seafield

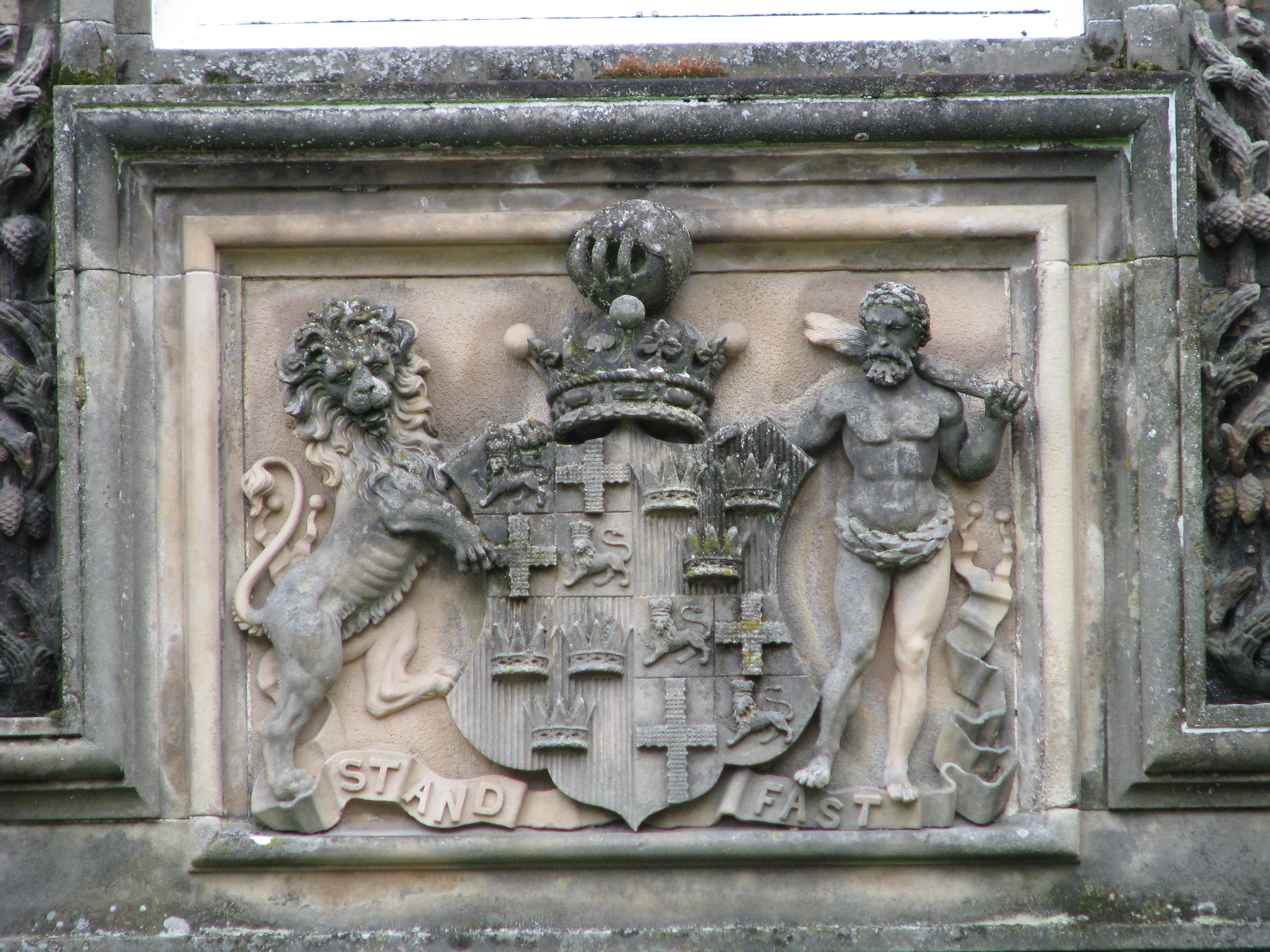
The Seafield arms as depicted in an armorial panel on the west wing of Cullen House

In the centuries following its initial construction, the house underwent a series of renovations, extensions and modifications. A tower was added in 1660, shortly after the third earl inherited it. In 1701 the fourth earl was created the first Earl of Seafield, and in 1709 the architects Alexander McGill and James Smith were asked to submit plans for a complete remodelling in the Palladian style. These were drawn up, but in the end less radical extensions and modifications were executed to the north and west wings, between 1711 and 1714.

The house was ransacked for a second time during the Jacobite rising of 1745. James Ogilvy, 5th Earl of Findlater had travelled with his wife to Aberdeen to meet the Duke of Cumberland who was pursuing the Jacobite Army led by Charles Edward Stuart. In their absence, a group of Stuart's supporters forced their way into the house on 8 April 1746 and ransacked it, carrying off as much as possible and destroying what could not be easily transported. Three days later, continuing his pursuit that would end at the Battle of Culloden, Cumberland arrived at the scene accompanied by Findlater to find the doors of the house forced open, the windows broken, and broken furniture and discarded papers strewn around the grounds. Findlater subsequently petitioned the British Parliament for the sum of £8,000 in compensation for the losses incurred, but it is not clear whether he ever received any payment. (Note: £8,000 in 1746 equates to approximately £1,500,000 in 2025, according to calculations based on retail price index measure of inflation.)

Architects James and John Adam worked on the house from 1767 to 1769, installing the main staircase and building the gatehouse, and John Baxter made more internal modifications, including the building of the large bow window in the east facade, between 1777 and 1778. In 1780, the fourth earl commissioned Robert Adam to provide a design for an entirely new house; this was not carried out, nor were James Playfair's 1788 designs for an extensive remodelling in "the Saxon style". Playfair's walled garden was constructed in the grounds in that year.

Detailed records survive showing the layout of the house's gardens in 1760. There were walled courts lined with flower borders, roses and fruit trees, and a classical arrangement of rectangular plots laid out symmetrically on either side of an avenue. Thomas White, a landscape architect from Nottinghamshire, drew up plans for new and extensive landscaped gardens in 1789, although these were only partially executed. Between 1820 and 1830, Ludovick Ogilvy-Grant, 5th Earl of Seafield extended the gardens considerably by demolishing the entire village of Cullen, and building a new planned town for its inhabitants, laid out by George MacWilliam with alterations by Peter Brown and William Robertson, nearer the coast. The only remaining building from the original village is Cullen Old Church. Later in the nineteenth century, the Great North of Scotland Railway hoped to cut through the house's grounds, but the earl refused his permission, forcing the company to build a viaduct, 196 metres (643 ft) long and 24.8 metres (81.4 ft) high, through the town of Cullen itself; the line was eventually opened in 1886.

The house's current baronial revival appearance is largely the result of the extensive remodelling that was carried out from 1858 to 1868 by David Bryce, who worked to homogenise the disparate styles of the different parts of the building, and redesigned much of the interior. By the time Bryce had finished working on the house, it had a total of 386 rooms.

=== Deterioration and renovation ===
Renovation work was carried out on the house in 1913 by Robert Lorimer, and in 1915 it was inherited by Nina Ogilvie-Grant-Studley-Herbert, the 12th Countess of Seafield, who later gained a reputation as the wealthiest woman in Britain after Queen Elizabeth II. Since she spent most of her time at her home in Nassau in the Bahamas, the house was not her primary residence. The house was open to the public for part of the year in the 1960s. Ogilvie-Grant-Studley-Herbert died in 1969, and her estates passed to her son, Ian Ogilvie-Grant. He also lived elsewhere, and used the house commercially to host shooting parties and private functions. In 1972 it was designated a Category A listed building. By this time it had become quite dilapidated, and its contents were sold off in 1975. Included in the sale was a collection of eighteenth-century paintings by Scottish artists working in Italy, including work by Cosmo Alexander.

In 1982 the house was purchased by Kit Martin, an architectural designer who specialises in saving derelict historic buildings. He and the local architect Douglas Forrest set about repairing and restoring the structure, and together they converted it into fourteen separate private homes. On 17 June 1987, two years after the renovations had been completed, a fire broke out in the south wing which was being fitted out for new owners. Firefighters fought to contain the blaze, and although they managed to put it out within three hours, severe damage was caused to the south-east corner and the west wing. Restoration work was carried out over the course of the next two years, using photographic records and material recovered from the fire to restore the external masonry to its original appearance. Specialist joiners and plasterers were brought in to work on the interiors, but some of the building's internal features including an early seventeenth-century painted ceiling in the second salon were irreparably damaged. The subdivided house remains in use as privately owned domestic accommodation as of 2021.

== Architecture ==
Cullen House is a large, ornately decorated and turreted house, which was built in several stages over several centuries. It is described by the architectural historian Charles McKean as an "enormously complicated structure", and "one of the grandest houses in Scotland".

=== Exterior ===
The seventeenth-century L-plan tower house, which itself incorporated stonework from earlier buildings on the site, has been extended by the addition of wings to the north and south. The original entrance to the tower house is in the south-west angle of its west courtyard, in a single-bay, four-storey facade. Above are two tourelles supported by corbels, one of which bears the initials SVO and DMD, representing Sir Walter Ogilvy and his wife, Dame Margaret Drummond, for whom the house was built. This entrance has now been blocked and replaced by a window.

The earliest section of the north wing, of five bays and three storeys in height, extends to the left of the door. Built in the early seventeenth century, its roof was raised in the eighteenth, and its windows were replaced with larger sash and case windows in the Georgian style. The roof line is broken by five dormer heads, carved with foliage and Corinthian capitals. In the centre of the wing is another entrance, designed by David Bryce and carved by Thomas Goodwillie, and described by architectural historians David Walker and Matthew Woodworth as "exuberant" and "wildly boisterous". This features pilasters, more carved foliage, a heraldic plaque and a pair of sculptural lions rampant. Beyond this block, there is a rectangular eighteenth-century extension, with a protruding gable end that was heavily baronialized in the nineteenth century. There are two-storey tourelles on each corner, and busts and carved figures, also by Goodwillie.

The original seventeenth-century part of the west wing has seven bays, and three carved dormer heads, decorated with figures that depict Faith, Hope, and Charity; all three originally had carved mottoes, but the inscription for Charity has been lost. The original seventeenth-century windows were mostly replaced with larger ones in the eighteenth century, but some of the original ones were blocked and have been retained as decorative features. At the west end, there is another extension, also baronialized in the nineteenth century, with more tourelles, a round staircase tower, and carvings of Father Time holding a scythe and flanked by figures representing Youth and Old Age.

The house's east facade, again heavily baronialized, has another entrance, recessed into the centre of the north wing, also with a flamboyantly carved doorway by Goodwillie; this is very similar to its counterpart on the other side of the wing, but without the lions. To either side of the doorway are a pair of four-storey towers, one with a datestone showing 1668, and there is a square bartizan as well as three more triangular dormer heads. To the left side of the east facade is the rear of the original tower house, which has an early seventeenth-century tourelle, and another dormer head featuring a carved sun.

The south facade looks onto the clifftop and the Cullen Burn below. At its right end is a staircase tower attached to the original tower house, to the left of which is a very large bow window. Left of this is a section of five bays, which is part of the eighteenth-century building work and has been little altered since, save for the addition of a single tourelle, and an elaborate staircase tower which can be seen prominently from the gorge below and is known as the Punch Bowl.

Beyond the north wing is a U-plan service court, two storeys high with a bellcote on its north facade. Built in the late eighteenth century, it originally housed the kitchen and laundry, and has been converted into six apartments and an architectural studio.

=== Interior ===
The main house has been divided into seven separate apartments. Efforts were made during the restoration to retain as many of the building's historical features as possible, and each of the principal rooms was retained intact within one of the apartments. There is a square entrance hall in the north wing, with a fireplace decorated with blue and white Delftware tiles. Beyond this is a two-storey stair hall, with a staircase and ceiling, both by James Adam, and an elaborately carved wooden door, dated 1618, with its original key and lock. Many of the house's original public rooms retain original Victorian ceilings; others, which were damaged in the fire of 1987, have been restored or reproduced. A grand Jacobean painted ceiling, depicting the siege of Troy and bearing the royal arms of Scotland (suggesting that it predated the 1603 Union of the Crowns), was destroyed by the fire. It has been replaced by a painting of bubbles and astronauts by Robert Ochardson.

== Grounds ==
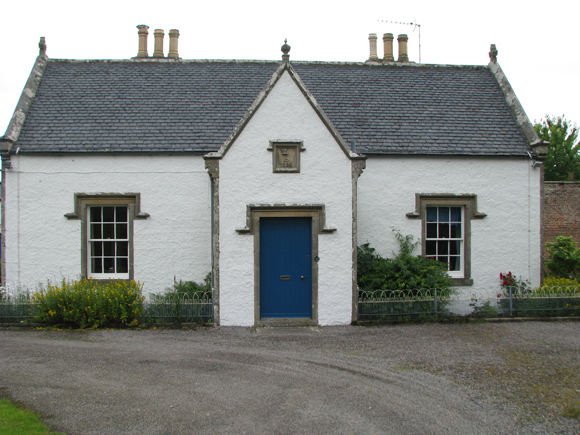
The former head gardener's cottage

The house's grounds contain several structures which are Category A listed in their own right. These include a bridge, gatehouse, and a temple.

Leading off the house's west courtyard is a bridge built between 1744 and 1745 by William Adam, which crosses the gorge of the Cullen Burn. It has a single arch, with a span of 25.6 metres (84 ft) and a height of 19.5 metres (64 ft), and is built of granite ashlar with rubble spandrels.

At the south-east entrance to the estate is a gatehouse known as the Grand Entrance, which was built by James Adam between 1767 and 1768. This wide entrance for carriages is built in the form of a triumphal arch. Ionic columns support a pediment with armorial decoration in the tympanum. On top there are carved lions, rampant at the apex, and recumbent to the sides. There are entrances for pedestrians in the walls flanking the archway, which connect to several single-storey lodges.

On a hilltop at the north end of the grounds there is a garden feature in the form of a Grecian temple pavilion made of polished ashlar. An open rotunda with a leaded roof and a plasterwork ceiling is supported by eight Ionic columns, which sit atop the walls of a round basement tearoom. There was originally a statue depicting either Pomona or Pheme at the centre of the rotunda. The tearoom has a round-arched doorway, flanked by matching windows. It was constructed in 1822 by William Robertson, following 1788 original designs by James Playfair which are still in the Seafield estate's archives. The statue was lost between 1939 and 1945, and the floor of the rotunda has collapsed; the round pediment of the statue now lies in the centre of the ruined tearoom. The structure was stabilised between 1977 and 1978, and restored in 1981 after it was threatened with demolition.

The grounds include a walled garden from 1788, designed by James Playfair. There are also several estate buildings, many of which were designed by Robertson, and by his nephews Alexander and William Reid who continued his practice after his death. These include an ice house, a garden house, a laundry, and cottages for staff such as gardeners.
