= Annie Quayle Townend =

New Zealand property owner

Anne Quayle Townend (née Moore; c. 1845–1914) was a New Zealand heiress and philanthropist.

== Biography ==
Townend's birthplace and date have been recorded as Sydney around 1845 and elsewhere as Tasmania in 1843. Her parents were George Moore and Anne Kermode; Kermode's parents owned the large sheep run that Moore worked on (Mona Vale, Tasmania) and there was speculation that Moore married her for access to the family wealth. The couple had four children together, however the marriage ended and in 1853 Moore emigrated to New Zealand alone, purchasing what would become Glenmark Estate in the Waipara Valley, North Canterbury, with funds from his ex-wife's family.

Townend was sent to be raised in her father's homeland of Isle of Man. When she was 19 years old she joined her father in New Zealand, living in a large mansion on the Glenmark property. The property was destroyed by fire in 1891 and Townend and her father moved to Christchurch. By this time her father's health was failing and he was losing his eyesight. He passed his business interests to Townend and gave her his power of attorney.

On her father's death in 1905, Townend was the sole benefactor of his estate, and inherited both property and funds. She bought the Karewa homestead and property in Fendalton Road from the Waymouth family, and renamed it Mona Vale after her childhood home in Tasmania. She had a gatehouse built at the property in a similar style to the mansion at Glenmark, increased the size of the property by nine acres, extended the landscaping and added to the variety of trees and plants. After the New Zealand International Exhibition, held in Hagley Park, finished in 1907, she purchased the exhibition's fernery including its plants and had it reassembled in the grounds. She also added a bath-house to the property. The property remains a heritage attraction in Christchurch.

Townend donated land from the former Glenmark Estate to the Waipara community and funded the construction of St Paul's Church, a 12-room vicarage, and space for a cemetery in memory of her late father. The church was opened in 1907.

For herself, Townend built a house in Sumner. She lived there for a time before having the house moved by traction engine to Macmillan Avenue in the Cashmere Hills, where she renamed it Glenhome. She died of a stroke at Glenhome in 1914 and is buried at St Peter's Church in Riccarton beside her father. In her will she left gifts to servants, family members and charities including the Salvation Army, Barnardo's and Nurse Maude. She also bequeathed an orchid and begonia glasshouse to the Christchurch Botanic Gardens; it had previously stood in the grounds of Holly Lea, a Christchurch homestead.

== Personal life ==
On 15 September 1900, unbeknownst to her ailing father, she married Dr. Joseph Henry Townend, JP (1847–1902), a prominent Christchurch physician and widower, at St Barnabas Church, Christchurch. Her stepdaughter Nina (from Townend's first marriage) had married James Ogilvie-Grant, 11th Earl of Seafield in 1898; they were the parents of Nina Ogilvie-Grant, 12th Countess of Seafield.
