= Douglas Forrest =

Scottish architect

Douglas Forrest is a Scottish retired architect. He studied architecture with Andy MacMillan, and as of 2013, had been practising as an architect for over 35 years. He describes his area of interest as "architectural archaeology", and seeks to preserve historical features of buildings when renovating them for modern use. His work in renovating buildings in the north east of Scotland has won awards from the Aberdeen Society of Architects and from Aberdeenshire Council.

Forrest worked with architectural designer Kit Martin on the renovation of Cullen House between 1982 and 1989. He also oversaw the restoration of the clock and steeple of the former church in the nearby town of Cullen, Moray in 1986. He has worked on a project to save Wardhouse, an abandoned Palladian mansion near Insch, and on a scheme to convert the ruins of New Slains Castle into holiday accommodation.

Forrest's design for the club house at Trump International Golf Links, Scotland drew criticism from MacMillan for its old-fashioned architecture. The design was defended by the secretary of the Royal Incorporation of Architects in Scotland, who argued that the building was well-suited to its purpose, and praised the quality of the specified materials.
