= Francis Ogilvie-Grant =

Francis Ogilvie-Grant may refer to:

- Francis Ogilvie-Grant, 10th Earl of Seafield (1847–1888), Scottish peer who emigrated to New Zealand
- Francis Ogilvie-Grant, 6th Earl of Seafield (1778–1853), Scottish nobleman, soldier and politician

== See also ==
- Francis Grant Ogilvie (1858–1930) was a Scottish educator, museum director, and scientist.
