= James Grant =

James Grant may refer to:

== Politics and law ==
- Sir James Grant, 1st Baronet (died 1695), Scottish lawyer
- Sir James Grant, 6th Baronet (1679–1747), Scottish Whig politician
- Sir James Grant, 8th Baronet (1738–1811), Scottish member of parliament
- James Grant, 11th of Glenmoriston (1792–1868), Scottish Highland chieftain
- James Grant (Texas politician) (1793–1836), Texas-Mexico politician, physician and military participant in the Texas Revolution
- James Grant (newspaper editor) (1802–1879), British newspaper editor
- James Grant (Iowa politician) (1812–1891), American political leader in Iowa
- James Macpherson Grant (1822–1885), Victoria (Australia) politician
- James Grant (Ontario politician) (1831–1920), Scottish-born Canadian physician and politician
- James Benton Grant (1848–1911), American governor of Colorado
- Sir James Augustus Grant, 1st Baronet (1867–1932), British Conservative Party member of parliament
- Jim Grant (lawyer) (born 1937), Canadian lawyer
- J. W. Grant (born 1982), member of the Florida House of Representatives
- Bill Grant (Florida politician) (born James William Grant) (born 1943), U.S. congressman from Florida

== Military ==
- James Grant (British Army officer, born 1720) (1720–1806), British general in Revolutionary War
- James Grant (navigator) (1772–1833), British naval officer, Australian explorer
- James Grant (British Army officer, born 1778) (1778–1852), British major-general who fought at Waterloo
- James Hope Grant (1808–1875), British general
- James Grant (RAF airman) (1899–?), Scottish World War I flying ace
- James Monteith Grant (1903–1981), Scottish officer of arms

== Arts and academia ==
- James Grant (1822–1887), Edinburgh-born author and historian
- James Ardern Grant (1887–1973), English portrait painter
- James Edward Grant (1905–1966), American short story writer and screenwriter
- James Grant (artist) (1924–1997), California painter and sculptor
- James Grant (finance) (born 1946), American author, journalist, and publisher of Grant's Interest Rate Observer
- Lee Child (born 1954), pseudonym of James D. "Jim" Grant, British thriller author
- James Grant (musician) (born 1964), Scottish musician
- James Grant, member of the duo Ill Blu
- Jim Grant, former principal of Cirencester College
- James Grant, Australian cinematographer for the 2016 film Nowhere Boys: The Book of Shadows

== Religion ==
- James Grant (Scottish bishop) (1706–1778), Roman Catholic bishop in Scotland
- James Grant (minister) (1800–1890), Scottish cleric and Director of Scottish Widows
- James Grant (Australian bishop) (1931–2019), Anglican bishop and Dean of Melbourne in Australia

== Sport ==
- Jim Grant (baseball) (1894–1985), Major League Baseball pitcher
- Jimmy Grant (1918–1970), Major League Baseball infielder
- Jim Grant (footballer), Scottish footballer
- Mudcat Grant (James Grant, 1935–2021), Major League Baseball pitcher
- James Grant (rugby) (born 1964), Australian rugby football international

== Other ==
- James Grant of Carron, 17th century Scottish clansman and outlaw
- James William Grant (astronomer) (1788–1865), Scottish astronomer, discoverer of Antares B
- James Augustus Grant (1827–1892), Scottish explorer in East Africa
- James Gordon Stuart Grant (1834–1902), a local eccentric in Dunedin, New Zealand.
- James Shaw Grant (1910–1999), writer and journalist from the Isle of Lewis
- James P. Grant (1922–1995), executive director of UNICEF
