= Grant James =

Grant James may refer to:

- Grant James (rower)
- Grant James (voice actor)

== See also ==
- James Grant (disambiguation)
