= Alice Waymouth =

New Zealand jeweler (1884–1963)

Alice Beatrice (Biddy) Waymouth (1884–1963) was a New Zealand metalworker and artist. Her work is held in the collection of the Canterbury Museum, Christchurch.

== Biography ==
Waymouth was the daughter of Frederick and Alice Waymouth and had a sister, Eleanor, who also became a notable artist. Her parents built a homestead named Karewa in Fendalton, Christchurch, in 1899–1890, where Waymouth grew up. The property was sold and renamed in 1905, and became the historic place known as Mona Vale.

Waymouth trained as an art metalworker and enameller. She travelled to England around 1905 or 1906 and studied at Charles Robert Ashbee's Guild of Handicraft in Chipping Campden.

Waymouth exhibited and sold work in the 1906–1907 New Zealand International Exhibition held in Christchurch.

In 1911, she visited England again and met and married the brother-in-law of her sister Eleanor, J.C. Hughes.
