= Eleanor Hughes =

New-Zealand-born British painter (1882-1959)

- Born: Eleanor Mary Waymouth; 3 April 1882; Christchurch, New Zealand
- Died: 1959 (aged 76–77); Lamorna, Cornwall, England
- Known for: Painting
- Spouse: Robert Morson Hughes
- Relatives: Alice Waymouth (sister)

Eleanor Mary Hughes (née Waymouth), (3 April 1882 – 1959) was a New Zealand landscape artist who mostly painted in watercolours. She settled and worked in Britain and became an active member of the Newlyn School of artists and the nearby Lamorna artists colony.

== Biography ==
Hughes was born in Christchurch in New Zealand. She was the daughter of Frederick and Alice Waymouth, and had a sister Alice Waymouth who was also a notable artist. Her family home, a homestead named Karewa in Christchurch, was sold and renamed in 1905 and became the historic property known as Mona Vale. Hughes grew up at Karewa and studied at Canterbury College School of Art.

In 1900 she won a medal from the Canterbury Fine Art Society for a series of drawings of trees. Her parents were originally from the west country of England and she choose to study art in England. She first visited Britain to study with C N Worsley between 1901 and 1903 and also, for a short while, attended the School of Painting and Drawing run by Stanhope Forbes and Elizabeth Forbes in Newlyn.

She painted a watercolour of the International Exhibition held in 1906 in Christchurch's Hagley Park. It depicts the exhibition's main building, an imposing white structure with a gold dome and two towers.

In 1907 Hughes returned to England to study at Frank Spenlove's Yellow Door Studio in London before returning to Newlyn to study at the Forbes School. In Newlyn, she met and, in January 1910 at St Buryan's Church, married a fellow student, the painter Robert Morson Hughes. The couple designed and built their own home, Chyangweal, near St Buryan. The house became a regular social centre for the artists settled in the area. Eleanor Hughes was a skilled pianist and would lead recitals at the house. In Cornwall the couple became lifelong friends with Laura Knight and her husband Harold Knight, both of whom painted them a number of times.

Hughes owned her own studio in the Lamorna valley where she created landscape paintings, often featuring the stone walls, waterfalls and streams of the local area. Hughes also painted in France and the Pyrenees on a regular basis. From 1911, she exhibited regularly at the Royal Academy and eventually with the Royal Institute of Painters in Water Colours. In total Hughes had some 37 pictures shown at the Royal Academy. In 1933 she was elected a member of the Royal Institute of Painters in Water Colours. As well as in galleries in Newlyn and St Ives, Hughes also had works shown at the Walker Art Gallery in Liverpool and at the Glasgow Institute of the Fine Arts. Hughes sold her studio in 1940 and appears to have produced little after doing so. She died in Lamorna in 1959.
