= J.T. Studley =

John Tatchell Studley (1864–1916), of Seaborough Court, was an English sportsman and landowner. He is best known for authoring The Journal of A Sporting Nomad (1912), an account of his big game hunting experiences in North America and Africa.

He was the son of John Studley JP, DL, Esq. of Broadwindsor, a prosperous manufacturer from an old Dorsetshire family, by his wife Sophia Anne Tatchell-Bullen, daughter of John Tatchell-Bullen, Esq. of Marchwood, a relative of Admiral Sir Charles Bullen.

Studley underwent many sporting trips abroad. He bagged lion near the Pungwe River in South Africa, then proceeded on an extended hunting trip to British East Africa where he successfully hunted buffalo, lion and eland. He also hunted caribou in Newfoundland; moose, grizzly bear, Stone sheep, and Dall Sheep in the Kenai peninsula, Alaska and British Columbia; and fished for tarpon and shark in Florida.

He married Beatrice de Chair, sister of Admiral Sir Dudley de Chair. His only son, Derek, married the Scottish heiress Nina Ogilvie-Grant, 12th Countess of Seafield and was the father of the 13th and present Earl of Seafield.

== Bibliography ==
- The Journal of A Sporting Nomad (1912), John Lane. New York.
