= Buildings at Risk Register =

Buildings at Risk Register may refer to:

- Heritage at Risk Register, maintained by Historic England and formerly known as the Buildings at Risk Register
- Buildings at Risk Register for Scotland, maintained by Historic Environment Scotland
- Buildings at Risk Register, or BaR, maintained by SAVE Britain's Heritage.
