= Kit Martin =

British architectural designer and country house property developer

Kit Martin CBE (born 6 May 1947) is a British architectural designer and country house property developer. He is the son of Sir Leslie Martin, Professor of Architecture at the University of Cambridge.

Since the 1970s, Kit Martin has specialised in the saving and restoration of country houses, by dividing them into smaller dwellings and apartments. He is an advisor to the Prince of Wales on the safeguarding of major historic buildings and remains an advisor to The Prince's Regeneration Trust (previously being a director of The Phoenix Trust), a trustee of Save Europe's Heritage, and a former member of the Historic Buildings Council for Scotland (now the Historic Environment Advisory Council for Scotland).

Martin has restored and converted around twelve houses, eight in England and four in Scotland, as well as other types of historic building. He has used the company name Kit Martin (Historic Houses Rescue) Limited since 1974, and Historic Houses Rescue Limited from 1996. From 2004 to 2007 Martin was an advisor to Save Britain's Heritage on the proposed purchase of Dumfries House in Scotland. At his home, Gunton Park, Martin also restored the historic designed landscape, winning the Country Life Genius of the Place Award for 2007.

Martin was appointed Commander of the Order of the British Empire (CBE) in the 2012 Birthday Honours for services to conservation.

== Projects ==
Kit Martin's country house developments include (in date order):

England

- Gunton Hall, Gunton Park, Norfolk, 1980, estate into 20 dwellings, one becoming Martin's own home; new boathouse in 2004
- Hazells Hall (or Hasells/Hassells), Bedfordshire, 1981–82, into 8 houses and 4 apartments
- Dingley Hall, Northamptonshire, early 1980s, into 7 houses and 3 apartments
- Callaly Castle, Northumberland, 1986–87
- Burley House, Rutland, 1993–98, into 6 apartments, estate into 22 dwellings
- Stoneleigh Abbey, Warwickshire, 1996–2000, estate into 53 dwellings
- Maristow House, Devon, 1996–2000

Note: Ecton Hall in Northamptonshire, converted by Hertfordshire building company Period Property Investments Plc in 1986–89 into 12 apartments (plus 7 existing and 9 new estate dwellings), may have involved Martin, but this is unconfirmed.

Scotland

- Cullen House, Aberdeenshire, 1983, into 6 houses, estate into 14 dwellings
- Keith Hall, Aberdeenshire, 1984–86
- Tyninghame House, East Lothian, 1987–89
- Formakin House, Renfrewshire, 1988–99, estate converted into 17 dwellings

Other projects include:

- St Nicholas Royal Naval Hospital, Great Yarmouth, Norfolk, 1996–97

== Books ==
- The Country House: To Be or Not to Be (1982) with Marcus Binney, Save Britain's Heritage, ISBN 0-905978-12-9, ISBN 978-0-905978-12-3.
- Chatham Historic Dockyard: Alive or Mothballed (1984) with Marcus Binney, Save Britain's Heritage, ISBN 0-905978-19-6, ISBN 978-0-905978-19-2.
