= George Henry Moore (runholder) =

- Born: 12 October 1812; Castletown, Isle of Man
- Died: 7 July 1905 (aged 92); Christchurch, New Zealand
- Occupation: runholder
- Spouse: Anne Kermode (m. 1839)
- Children: Annie Quayle Townend

George Henry Moore (12 October 1812 – 7 July 1905), derogatorily known as Scabby Moore, was a New Zealand runholder and proprietor of the Glenmark estate.

== Early life ==
Moore was born at Billown near Castletown, Isle of Man on 12 October 1812. He was baptised at Malew on 1 January 1813. In about 1830, he emigrated to Tasmania with his friend Robert Kermode and then worked on Mona Vale Station owned by William Kermode (Robert's father). Moore married Anne Kermode, the owner's daughter, at Avoca. They had four children, including Annie (his only surviving child and eventual heiress). He was later the owner of Glenmark Station north of Waipara, which for a time was New Zealand's largest sheep run.

== Settling New Zealand ==
Moore went to New Zealand in 1853 to prospect for land. With funds put up by Robert Kermode, he purchased large landholdings in North Canterbury (including Glenmark). Upon his return to Tasmania, a company was set up under the name Moore and Kermode, with Moore to be the manager and William Moore (his son), Robert Kermode, and Dr John Lillie. The partnership also bought land in mid-Canterbury (Wakanui, Rokeby, and Longbeach) in the Ashburton District, but this had been sold again by the mid-1870s.

Heritage New Zealand has four separate listings on Glenmark Station. Moore had a mansion constructed for him, which took seven years to build. It was finished in 1888, but burned out on 23 January 1891. The two-storey house had cost around £15,000 to build and the furniture was valued at around £10,000; there was no insurance. The ruins have a Category II classification. The horse stables, built of concrete in ca. 1881 for up to 50 horses, gave expression to his wealth. The stables are of considerable technological importance (due to the early use of concrete) and have a Category I listing. The Glenmark Station Lodge is listed as a Category II building and still in use. The Station Manager's House is disused these days and registered as Category II.

== Death ==
Moore died at Christchurch in 1905, having been blind for several years. His estate was valued by probate at £253,000. With her inheritance, his daughter purchased a property in Christchurch, which she renamed Mona Vale after her mother's property.

Photo gallery

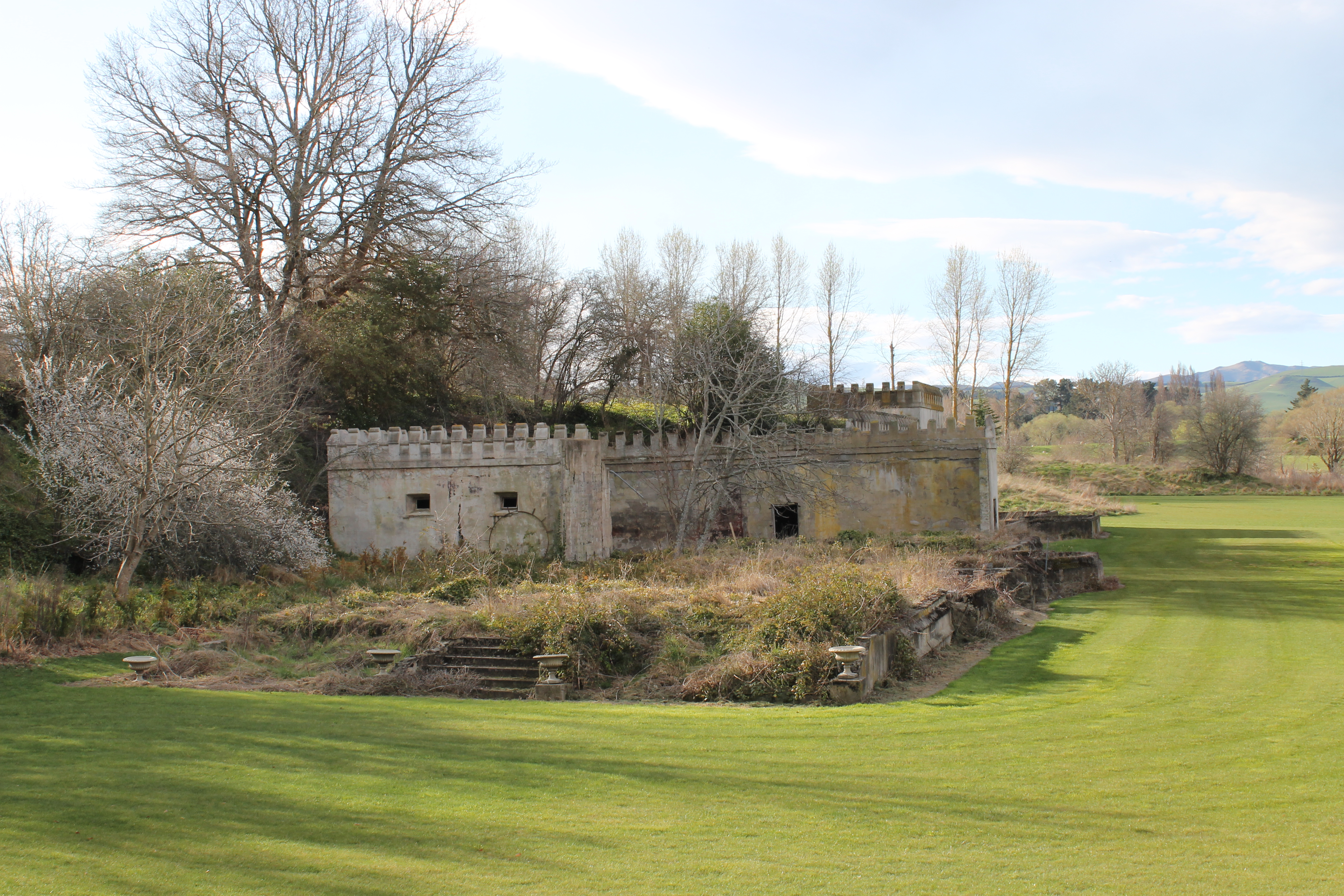
Ruins of the mansion

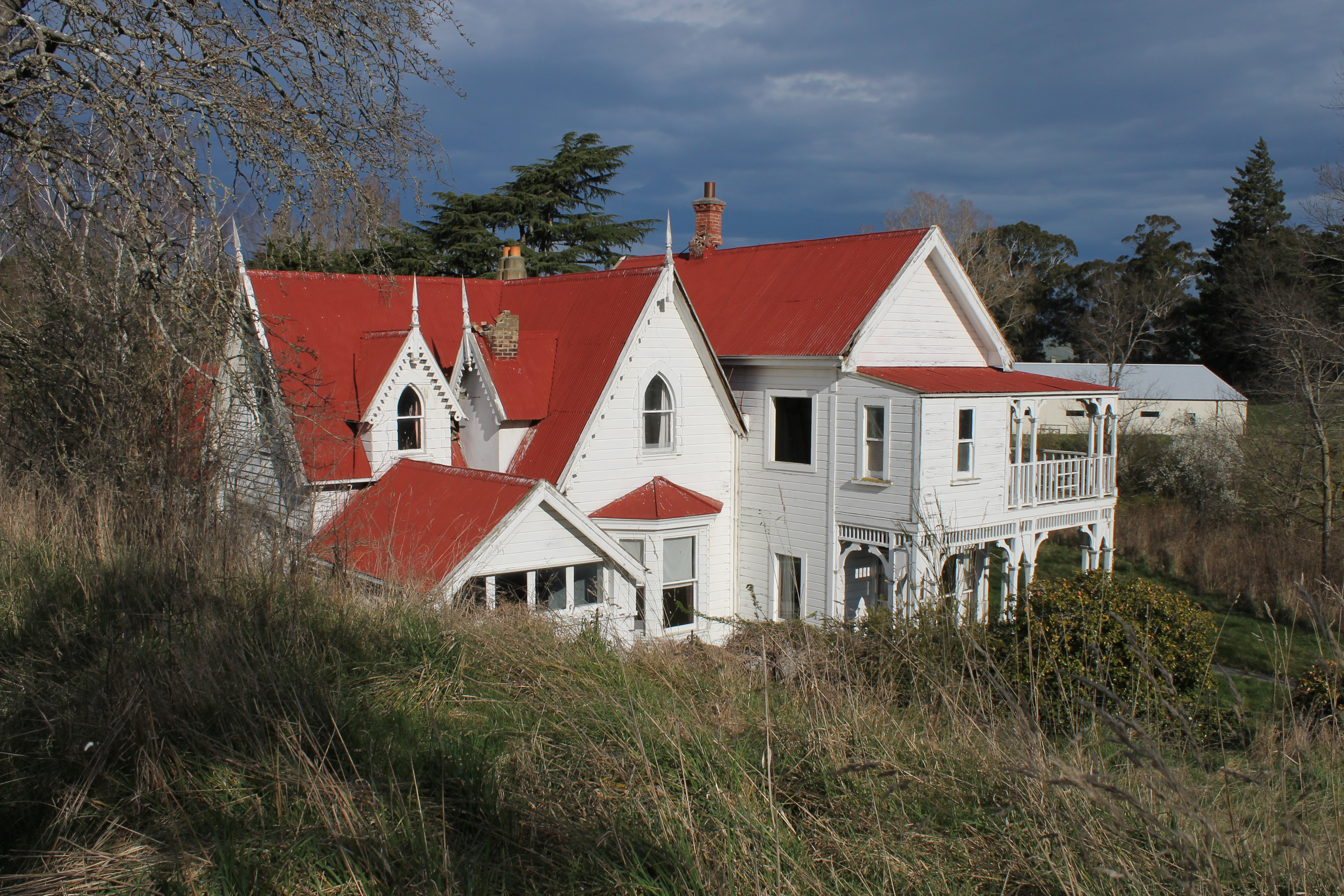
Station Manager's House

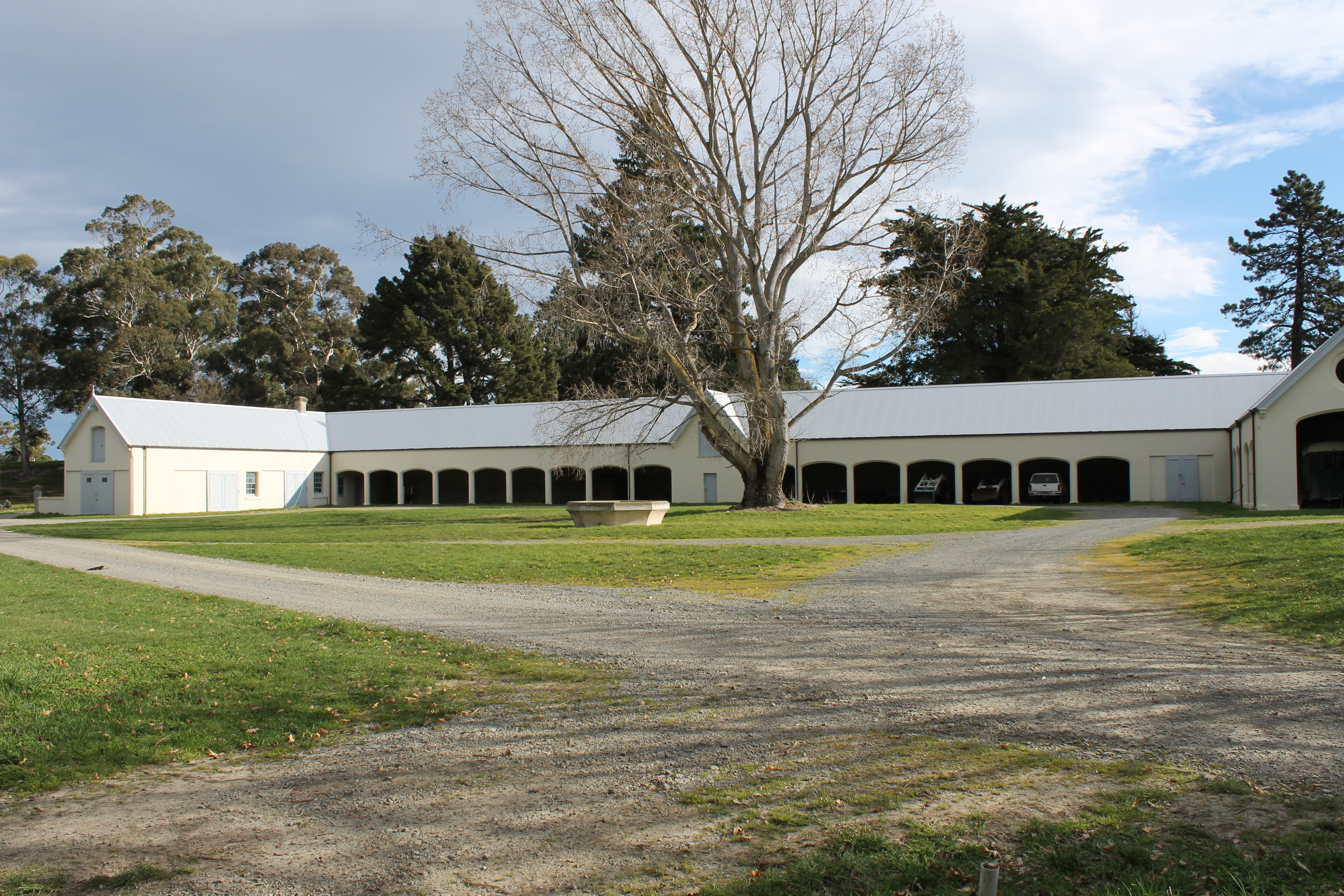
Glenmark Station Stables

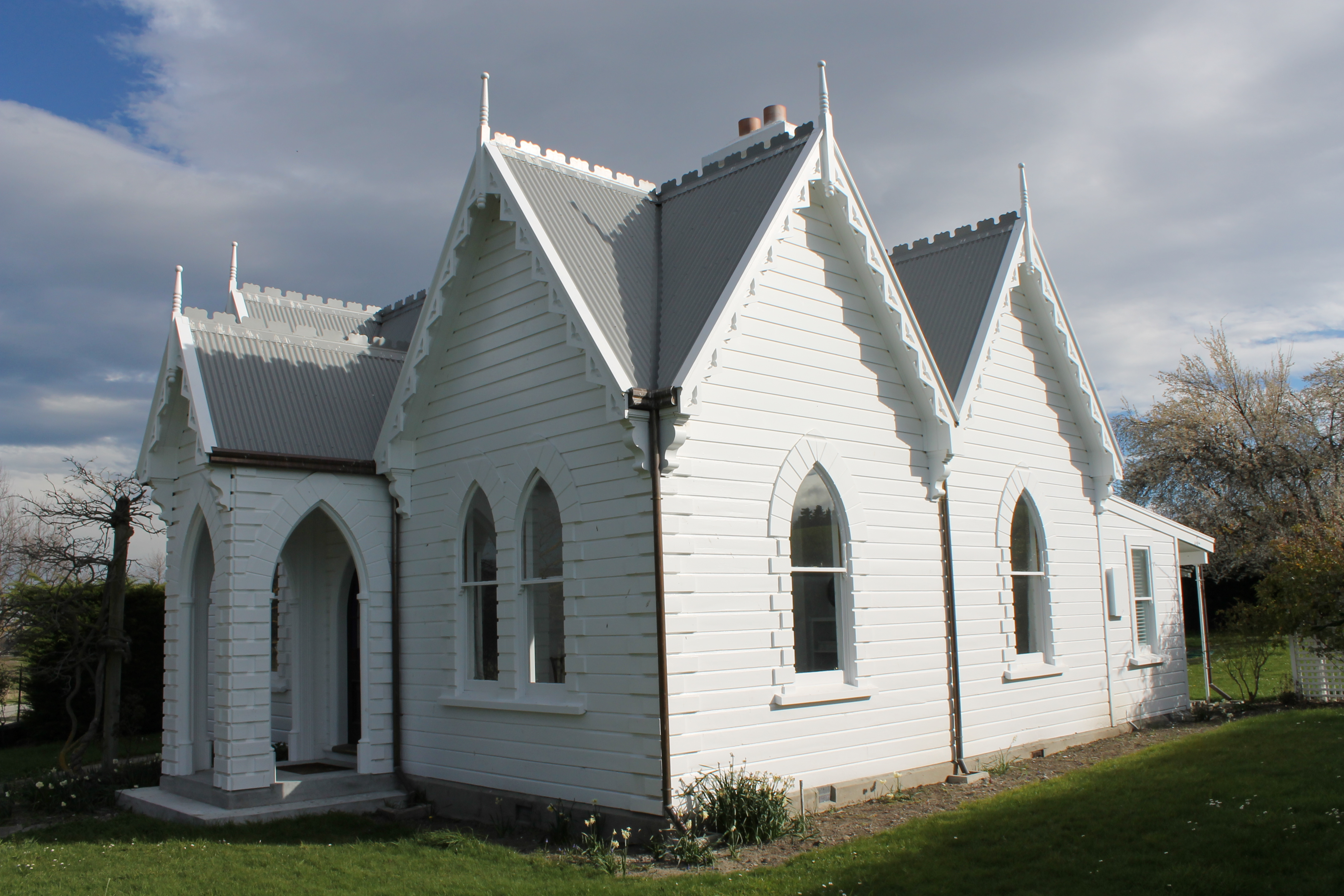
Station Lodge
