= Marcus Binney =

British architectural historian

- Born: Marcus Hugh Crofton Binney; 21 September 1944 (age 82)
- Occupations: British architectural historian and author

Marcus Hugh Crofton Binney CBE (né Marcus Hugh Crofton Simms; 21 September 1944) is a British architectural historian and author. He is best known for his conservation work regarding Britain's heritage.

== Early and family life ==
Binney is the son of Lieutenant-Colonel Francis Crofton Simms MC and his wife, Sonia (née Beresford Whyte). His father was in the Long Range Desert Group (LRDG) in the Second World War. He was captured in Libya in January 1942 prior to being held as a prisoner of war in Italy and escaped from a lorry in transit in Northern italy and stayed free until he was able to cross the Allied lines in Southern Italy. His mother worked in code-breaking. Following his father's death and his mother's remarriage to Sir George Binney (DSO) in 1955, Marcus took his stepfather's surname.

Binney was educated at Eton College and read history of art at the University of Cambridge. The architect Walter Ison was a family friend, who encouraged the young Binney to study Sir Robert Taylor for his PhD.

== Personal life ==
Binney married the Honourable Sara Anne Vanneck, daughter of Gerald Charles Arcedeckne Vanneck, 6th Baron Huntingfield, on 23 August 1966. They were divorced in 1976. She died in 1979. Binney remarried, to Anne Hills. Binney has two children.

== Career ==
Binney was a co-curator of the Destruction of the Country House exhibition, held at the V&A in 1974, with Roy Strong and John Harris, which gave impetus to the movement to conserve British country houses. He was a driving force behind the foundation of Save Britain's Heritage (Save) the following year, and remains its president. Save is devoted to the salvation of Britain's architectural heritage and retention of such buildings for the nation. It campaigns for the preservation and reuse of endangered historic buildings, placing particular emphasis on finding new uses for them.

In 1975, he was awarded the London Conservation Medal. He was also involved in the foundation of the Railway Heritage Trust and the Thirties Society (now Twentieth Century Society) and Save Jersey's Heritage, was made an Honorary Fellow of the Royal Institute of British Architects in 2004, and has been a vice-president of the Ulster Architectural Heritage Society since 2005.

Binney was instrumental in saving Calke Abbey in Derbyshire and its contents for the nation in 1984; he had highlighted and publicised the loss to the nation of such historic houses following the failure of Save's attempts to preserve Mentmore Towers in Buckinghamshire, a decade earlier.

He also writes widely on the conservation of the built environment. From 1977 until 1984 he was Architectural Editor of the British Country Life magazine. He served as Editor from 1984 to 1986, and continues to contribute articles to the magazine.

He has been the architectural correspondent of The Times since 1991. He was founding Chairman of Heritage Link in 2002.

Binney authored numerous books, mostly concerned with the preservation of Britain's architectural heritage; while many of these can be typified by such titles as "The Country House: To Be or Not to Be" and "Re-use of Industrial Buildings" he has also written books dealing with the experiences of those involved in secret operations during World War II, such as "Secret War Heroes: The Men of Special Operations" and "The Women Who Lived for Danger". He has lectured on architecture in the United States, and narrated a television series "Mansions: The Great Houses of Europe" in the 1990s.

== Honours ==
In recognition of his services to conservation and Britain's heritage, he was appointed Officer of the Order of the British Empire (OBE) in 1983 and Commander of the Order of the British Empire (CBE) in 2006.

== Bibliography ==
=== Books ===
- Binney, Marcus; Burman, Peter (1977). Chapels & Churches: Who Cares. British Tourist Authority. ISBN 0-85630-555-3.
- Binney, Marcus; Burman, Peter (1977). Change and Decay: Future of Our Churches. Littlehampton Book Services. ISBN 978-0289707746.
- Binney, Marcus; Harris, John; Winnington, Emma (1980). Lost Houses of Scotland. Save Britain's Heritage.
- Binney, Marcus; Martin, Kit (1982). The Country House: To Be or Not to Be. Save Britain's Heritage. ISBN 978-0-905978-12-3.
- Binney, Marcus; Martin, Kit (1984). Chatham Historic Dockyard: Alive or Mothballed. Save Britain's Heritage. ISBN 978-0-905978-19-2.
- Binney, Marcus; Machin, Francis; Powell, Ken (1990). Bright Future: Re-use of Industrial Buildings. Save Britain's Heritage. ISBN 978-0-905978-29-1.
- Binney, Marcus (1999). The Ritz Hotel, London. Thames & Hudson. ISBN 978-0-500-01934-4.
- Binney, Marcus (2002). The Women Who Lived for Danger: The Women Agents of SOE in the Second World War. Hodder & Stoughton. ISBN 0-340-81840-9.
- Binney, Marcus (2003). Great Houses of Europe: From the Archives of Country Life. Aurum Press. ISBN 978-1-85410-849-4.
- Binney, Marcus (2005). Secret War Heroes: The Men of Special Operations Executive. Hodder & Stoughton. ISBN 978-0-340-82909-7.
- Binney, Marcus (2006). The Ritz Hotel, London (Centenary ed.). Thames & Hudson. ISBN 978-0-500-51279-1.
- Binney, Marcus (2007). In Search of the Perfect House: 500 of the Best Buildings in Britain and Ireland. Weidenfeld & Nicolson. ISBN 978-0-297-84455-6.
- Binney, Marcus (2016). Big Saves: Heroic transformations of great landmarks. Save Britain's Heritage. ISBN 978-0-905978-74-1.

=== Essays and reporting ===
- Strong, Roy; Harris, John; Binney, Marcus (10 September 2014). "Fighting the good fight". Country Life. 208 (37): 118–124.
