= Nina Ogilvie-Grant, 12th Countess of Seafield =

Scottish peeress

The Right Honourable The Countess of Seafield
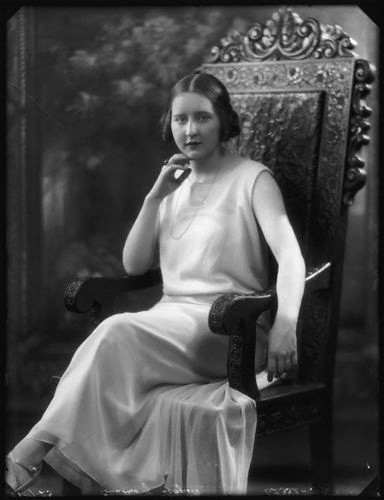
- Nina Seafield
- Born: Lady Nina Caroline Ogilvie-Grant; 17 April 1906; Nice, France
- Died: 30 September 1969 (aged 63); Marylebone, London, England
- Spouse: Derek Studley-Herbert (m. 1930; div. 1957)
- Children: Ian Ogilvie-Grant, 13th Earl of Seafield; Lady Pauline Ogilvie-Grant
- Parent(s): James Ogilvie-Grant, 11th Earl of Seafield; Nina Townend

Nina Caroline Ogilvie-Grant, 12th Countess of Seafield (17 April 1906 – 30 September 1969) was a Scottish peeress and landowner.

== Early life ==
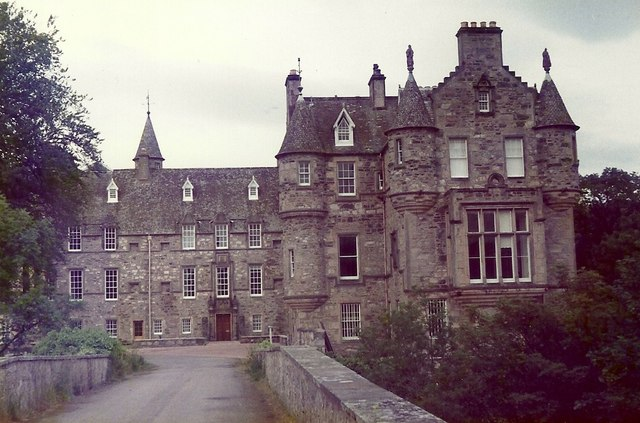
Cullen House, seat of the Earl of Seafield

Nina Seafield was born on 17 April 1906 in Nice, Provence, France. She was the only child of James Ogilvie-Grant, 11th Earl of Seafield and the New Zealand heiress Mary Elizabeth Nina Townend (1876–1962). One of the family seats was Castle Grant, Morayshire. She rented out the castle to American financier and railroad executive George Jay Gould in 1922. She was a friend of Nancy Mitford and especially close with Mark Ogilvie-Grant, a cousin who at one point considered marrying her.

Her paternal grandparents were Francis William Ogilvie-Grant, 10th Earl of Seafield and the former Anne Trevor Corry Evans. Her maternal grandparents were Dr. Joseph Henry Townend and Harriet (née Cox) Townend, of Christchurch.

=== Peerage ===
Her father was killed in action on 12 November 1915 in France during World War I and Nina succeeded, suo jure, to the earldom of Seafield in the Peerage of Scotland. Her uncle, Trevor Ogilvie-Grant, succeeded to the barony of Strathspey in the Peerage of the United Kingdom, and as Chief of the Clan Grant.

== Personal life ==
On 2 January 1930, Lady Seafield's engagement was announced to Derek Herbert Studley-Herbert (1907–1960), son of John Tatchell Studley and Beatrice de Chair. They married on 24 January 1930 in London. Before their divorce in 1957, they were the parents of:

- Ian Derek Francis Ogilvie-Grant, 13th Earl of Seafield (born 1939), who married firstly Mary Dawn Mackenzie Illingworth, daughter of Henry George Coats Illingworth (son of Sir Percy Illingworth), in 1960. They divorced in 1971 and he married secondly Leila Refaat, daughter of Mahmoud Refaat, in 1971.
- Lady Pauline Anne Ogilvie-Grant (1944–2010), who married firstly her brother-in-law James Henry Harcourt Illingworth in 1964. They divorced in 1970 and she married secondly Sir William Gordon-Cumming, 6th Baronet in 1972. They were divorced in 1976 and she married thirdly Hugh Richard Sykes in 1976. They too divorced and she married finally David John Nicholson in 1989.

A month after her divorce, her engagement to Armar E. Archbold was announced. Archbold, heir to a Standard Oil fortune, however, died before they were wed.

Her former husband died of cancer on 26 March 1960 in Jamaica. Lady Seafield died of cancer in a London hospital on 30 September 1969 and was succeeded in the earldom of Seafield by her only son Ian.

=== Reputed wealth ===
The Countess of Seafield was allegedly the second richest woman in Britain after Queen Elizabeth II. At the time of her death, she was said to have earned $250,000 a year and owned "300 square miles in the shires of Banff, Moray and Inverness." She owned Cullen House and Castle Grant, but spent most of her time in Paris and the Bahamas where she owned properties.

Peerage of Scotland
Preceded by James Ogilvie-Grant	Countess of Seafield; 1915–1969	Succeeded by Ian Derek Francis Ogilvie-Grant
