= Cullen Old Church =

- Cullen Auld Kirk
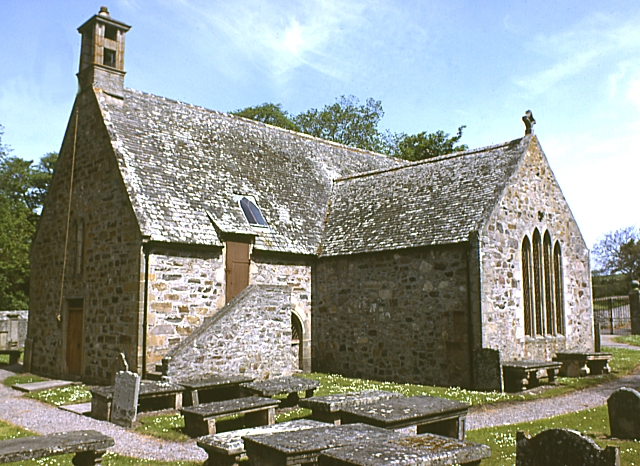
- The four-light window in the south gable
- Cullen Old Church
- 57.6843°N 2.8280°W
- Location: Cullen, Moray
- Country: Scotland
- Denomination: Church of Scotland
- Previous denomination: Roman Catholic (prior to the Scottish Reformation)
- Website: www.cullen-deskford-church.org.uk

History
- Founded: Earliest record 1236

Architecture
- Functional status: Active
- Heritage designation: Category A listed building

Cullen Old Church (also known as Cullen Auld Kirk) is the parish church for Cullen and Deskford, in Moray. It was originally a part of the Roman Catholic Church, but has been a part of the Church of Scotland since the Scottish Reformation. John R. Hume describes Cullen Old Church as a fine example of late Scots Gothic architecture, and it was designated a Category A listed building in 1972. It is still an active place of worship.

First mentioned in records dating from 1236 that document its elevation to a parish church, it was further elevated to collegiate status in 1543, and underwent a series of extensions, improvements and renovations in the centuries that followed. It is known for being the burial place of the internal organs of Queen Elizabeth de Burgh. After Elizabeth died at Cullen Castle in 1327, her body was taken to Dunfermline for interment, but the organs, which were removed as part of the embalming process, were buried at the church. Her husband, King Robert the Bruce, subsequently established a chaplaincy at the church to offer prayers for her soul.

== Description ==
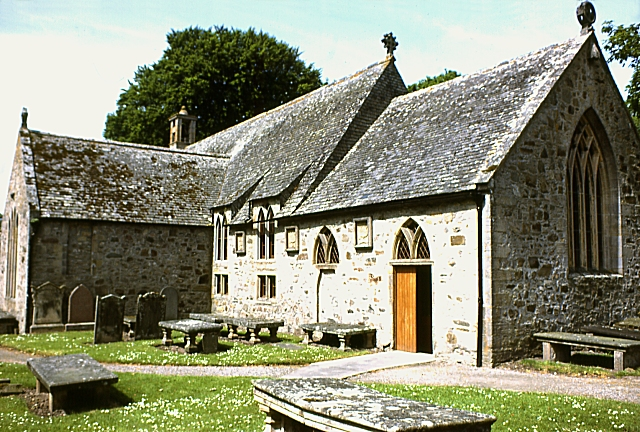
The east end, with chancel and gable window

Cullen Old Church, also known as Cullen Auld Kirk (and, as a Roman Catholic church prior to the reformation, St Mary's Church), sits within a high-walled churchyard, amongst many ornately carved tombs and memorial slabs. It is a simple, cross-plan church, rubble-built with sandstone and granite ashlar detailing for windows, corner stones and tracery. At the apex of the west gable there is an 18th-century bellcote, its south gable has four tall lancet windows, and there is a point-headed window, featuring intersecting tracery, in the gable at the east end of the nave. Rectangular heraldic plaques celebrate the Ogilvy and Gordon families, in honour of the founder of the college and his wife. John R. Hume, former Chief Inspector of Historic Buildings for Historic Scotland, listed it in his book on the hundred best churches in Scotland, describing it as "an exceptional example of the influence of the Renaissance on late Scots Gothic".

=== Interior ===
The interior has a cruciform layout, with a narrow nave, and aisles to north and south. A gallery runs above the west end of the nave, and curves round into the north aisle. There are wooden pews throughout, which were installed in the later 19th century. The walls would have been plastered originally, but this was removed in 1967 to allow repointing of the interior walls. The ceiling retains its original plasterwork with polygonal profiling. Against the south wall, the Seafield Loft, a substantial two-storey gallery, dominates the nave. Its panelled front bears heraldic designs and foliage; it is supported by Corinthian columns at either end, and accessed by a flight of stairs at its east end. An ornate sacrament house, donated by Alexander Ogilvy of Findlater, who helped establish the collegiate church, and his wife Elizabeth Gordon, is built into the east end of the north chancel wall.

=== Monuments ===
The church, and surrounding churchyard, house a number of ornately carved monuments. That of Ogilvy and Gordon, who donated the sacrament house, takes the form of a canopied tomb on the north wall of the chancel. Drawing inspiration from the tomb of John de Winchester at Elgin Cathedral, it is elaborately carved, and unusual in that it contains an effigy depicting civilian clothes rather than armour. Carved memorial slabs around the church commemorate various other members of the Ogilvy family, including James Ogilvy, 4th Earl of Findlater and 1st Earl of Seafield, who was Lord Chancellor of Scotland and a signatory to the 1707 Act of Union.

== History ==
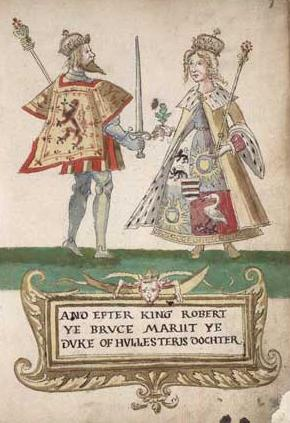
Robert the Bruce and Elizabeth de Burgh

The current building looks superficially like an ordinary eighteenth- or nineteenth-century parish church, but it actually has a much longer and more complex history. The first surviving record of the church is a successful petition of 1236 requesting that it be elevated from a chapel of the parish of Fordyce to a parish church. In 1327, Queen Elizabeth de Burgh, second wife of Robert the Bruce, died at Cullen Castle, a royal residence; her entrails were removed as part of the embalming process, and were buried in the church grounds, prior to her body being sent south to Dunfermline for interment. The King founded a chaplaincy at the church, dedicated to St Mary the Virgin, patron saint of Cullen, to offer prayers for her soul.

In 1536, a chaplaincy of St Anne was founded by Elena Hay, and she had a south aisle added to the simple medieval church. Soon afterwards, in 1543, it was elevated from a parochial to a collegiate church, one of 38 such churches in Scotland at the time. This was led by Alexander Ogilvy of Findlater; Alexander Dick, Archdeacon of Glasgow; John Duff of Muldavit, Hay's son; and the parishioners of Cullen. Work was done on the east end of the church at this time to lengthen the chancel. As a collegiate church, it had six prebendaries, and two choristers to sing daily masses.

A laird's loft (a gallery in a church reserved for the family of the laird), known as the Seafield Loft, was installed by the Ogilvys in 1602 to allow members of the family to sit apart from, and above, the rest of the congregation. It is decorated with armorial panelling emphasising the influence of the family, who were by then baronets. The loft, with pew below, is one of the earliest and best-preserved examples of such a structure surviving in Scotland.

A north aisle was added to the building around 1798; the gallery running from the west end of the nave into the north aisle is believed to date from the early nineteenth century.

Between 1820 and 1830, a new town was built for the residents of Cullen, and the old town was entirely demolished to allow the Earls of Seafield to improve their estate. Cullen Old Church is the only remaining building from the original village. A carving of the Virgin and Child, currently to be found on the old mercat cross in Cullen Square, was moved from outside the church gates at this time. Most of the windows currently in the building likely date either from work done at this time, or from restoration works carried out on behalf of the Dowager Countess of Seafield in 1885.

A vestry was built in the angle between the north aisle and the chancel in 1967; work done at that time stripped the original plaster from the interior walls. In 1972, it was designated a Category A listed building.

In 2016, LDN Architects were commissioned to conduct a strategic study on the building to identify and cost necessary maintenance work. The report found that an overhaul of the roof, repointing to interior and exterior walls, and the installation of a heating system and a disabled lavatory would all be required, at an estimated cost of £300,000. The North East Preservation Trust allocated a grant to fund the work.

=== List of chaplains and ministers ===
==== Pre-reformation ====
- Alexander Forcyth, 1472
- Thomas Gregor, 1542
- William Malisoun, 1542
- Sir Gilbert Davesoun, 1542 (Prebendary 1543)
- William Elphinstone, 1543
- Robert Leith, 1543
- John Thain, 1543
- George Gray, 1543
- William Lawtie (Prebendary), 1553
- Sir George Duff (Provost), 1563

==== Post-reformation ====
- William Lawtie, 1563
- Gilbert Gardyne, 1568–1589
- Alexander Hay, 1590–1594
- Patrick Darg, 1599–1601
- George Douglas, 1601–1641
- George Lesley, 1642–1647
- Alexander Setone, 1647–1650
- James Chalmer, 1652–1653
- Robert Tait, 1697–1700
- Alexander Irvine, 1705–1717
- James Lawtie, 1717–1751
- James Anderson, 1751–1762
- Robert Grant, 1762–1808
- George Innes, 1808–1829
- George Henderson, 1829–1884
- William T P Macdonald, 1884–1900
- William G G McLean, 1901–1927
- William G Robertson, 1927–1936
- John T Guthrie 1967–1986
- Alexander J MacPherson, 1987–1996
- G Melvyn Wood, 1997–2004
- Wilma A Johnston, 2006–2008
- John Oswald (Interim Minister) 2009
- Douglas F Stevenson, 2010 – present

== Use ==
Cullen Old Church serves as the parish church for Cullen and Deskford.
