= Sir James Grant, 1st Baronet =

Sir James Grant, 1st Baronet (died 1695) was a Scottish lawyer of the seventeenth century.

Appointed King's Advocate, he was created a baronet, "of Dalvey, Elgin", in the baronetage of Nova Scotia on 10 August 1688, with remainder "to his heirs whatsoever". He died in 1695 and was succeeded in his title and estates by his younger brother Ludovic.

Lodge's Genealogy of the Existing British Peerage and Baronetage states that this family of Grant is "a branch of the ancient family of Grant, of Grant".

== Footnotes ==
- Leigh Rayment's list of baronets

Baronetage of Nova Scotia
New creation	Baronet (of Dalvey); 1688–1695	Succeeded by Ludovic Grant
