= Jim Grant (footballer) =

Scottish footballer

Personal information
- Full name: James Grant
- Place of birth: Scotland
- Position: Right winger

Senior career*
Years	Team	Apps	(Gls)
1946	Brighton	1	(0)
- Eastbourne United
- * Club domestic league appearances and goals

James Grant was a Scottish professional footballer who played as a right winger for Brighton.
