= Patrick Grant, 5th Baron Strathspey =

British peer

Donald Patrick Trevor Grant, 5th Baron Strathspey, CBE, FRICS (18 March 1912 – 27 January 1992) was a British peer, land agent and Chief of Clan Grant. Born in New Zealand, he was the only son of Trevor Ogilvie-Grant, 4th Baron Strathspey and his wife Alice Louisa Johnston.

Educated at Stowe and Wye College, he trained as a land agent and surveyor. Upon the death of his father in 1948, he succeeded to the Barony of Strathspey. He inherited no estate of his own, however.

During World War II he enlisted with the land branch of the War Department and ultimately gained the rank of honorary Lieutenant colonel. He was appointed Commander of the Order of the British Empire and a Fellow of the Institute of Chartered Surveyors.

== See also ==
- Baron Strathspey
- Clan Grant

== Notes ==
=== References ===
Peerage of the United Kingdom
Preceded by Trevor Ogilvie-Grant of Grant	Baron Strathspey; 1948–1992	Succeeded by James Patrick Trevor Grant of Grant
