= Ian Ogilvie-Grant, 13th Earl of Seafield =

Scottish peer (born 1939)

The Right Honourable The Earl of Seafield

Member of the House of Lords Lord Temporal
- In office 30 September 1969 – 11 November 1999

Personal details
- Born: Ian Derek Francis Studley-Herbert; 20 March 1939 (age 87) Chelsea, London, England
- Party: Conservative
- Spouse(s): Mary Illingworth (m. 1960; div. 1971) Leila Refaat (m. 1971)
- Children: 2
- Parent(s): Derek Studley-Herbert; Nina Ogilvie-Grant, 12th Countess of Seafield

Ian Derek Francis Ogilvie-Grant, 13th Earl of Seafield (born 20 March 1939) is a British peer and landowner.

== Background ==
Ian Seafield was born in Chelsea on 20 March 1939. He is the son of Derek Herbert Studley-Herbert (1907–1960) and Nina Caroline Ogilvie-Grant, 12th Countess of Seafield, only child of the 11th Earl of Seafield. He was educated at Eton College. He was styled Viscount Reidhaven by courtesy until 1969 when he succeeded his mother to the earldom of Seafield in the Scottish peerage.

As the head of the Seafield family's 84,500-acre estate, he is one of the principal landowners in Scotland. The family seat is Cullen House, while Castle Grant was sold in 1983.

He was a member of the House of Lords from 1969 until the reforms in 1999 removed most hereditary peers. He was affiliated with the Conservative Party. Seafield was one of the largest donors to the successful 'No' campaign in the run-up to the 2014 Scottish independence referendum.

== Personal life ==
On 5 October 1960, he married Mary Dawn Mackenzie Illingworth (granddaughter of Sir Percy Illingworth) at the Savoy Chapel. They had two sons:

- James Andrew Ogilvie-Grant, Viscount Reidhaven (born 30 November 1963); heir apparent.
- Hon. Alexander Derek Henry Ogilvie-Grant (born 26 January 1966); married Lucy Clare Potts, daughter of Henry Potts, of Eglingham Hall, in 1995, and had issue:
  - John Francis Henry Ogilvie-Grant (born 2000)
  - Ivan James Valentine Ogilvie-Grant (born 2003)
  - (James) Aeneas Ogilvie-Grant (born 2006)

Lord Seafield separated from his wife in August 1969, and the couple were divorced on 24 July 1971. Shortly thereafter he re-married to Leila Refaat (born 1944), daughter of Mahmoud Refaat, of Cairo.

Peerage of Scotland
Preceded by Nina Caroline Ogilvie-Grant	Earl of Seafield; 1969 – present	Incumbent
