= Historic buildings council =

Three separate historic buildings councils were created by the Historic Buildings and Ancient Monuments Act 1953, one for each of England, Scotland, and Wales. Each Historic Buildings Council advised the relevant government minister on the exercise of powers under the 1953 Act relating to the preservation of listed buildings and other buildings of special architectural or historic interest, including applications for grants. Responsibilities for advice in relation to the Planning (Listed Buildings and Conservation Areas) Act 1990 were added later.

All three have now been abolished and replaced by other bodies.

- The Historic Buildings Council for England was abolished by section 39 of the National Heritage Act 1983; its functions, and those of the Ancient Monuments Board for England, were taken up by Historic Buildings and Monuments Commission for England (better known as English Heritage).
- The Historic Buildings Council for Scotland was abolished, along with various other public bodies, including the Ancient Monuments Board for Scotland, by section 4 of the Public Appointments and Public Bodies etc (Scotland) Act 2003 (2003 asp 4) and its functions were taken up by a new advisory body, the Historic Environment Advisory Council for Scotland, which itself was dissolved in 2012.
- The Historic Buildings Council for Wales underwent a quinquennial review in 2002, which concluded that it was effective and provided value for money, and, subject to some changes to enable its future development and structure to be determined in a more flexible way, should continue in existence. However, it was abolished by statutory instrument in 2006, and all of its property was transferred to the National Assembly for Wales. It and the Ancient Monuments Board for Wales were re-established as an advisory council, the Historic Buildings Advisory Council for Wales.

A fourth Historic Buildings Council, for Northern Ireland, was created by the Planning (Northern Ireland) Order 1972. It continues to exist, now regulated by the Planning (Northern Ireland) Order 1991. It retains responsibility for the listing buildings of special architectural or historic interest in Northern Ireland, designating Conservation Areas, and the preservation of listed buildings.
