= Mona Vale, Christchurch =

Historic building and park in New Zealand

Mona Vale
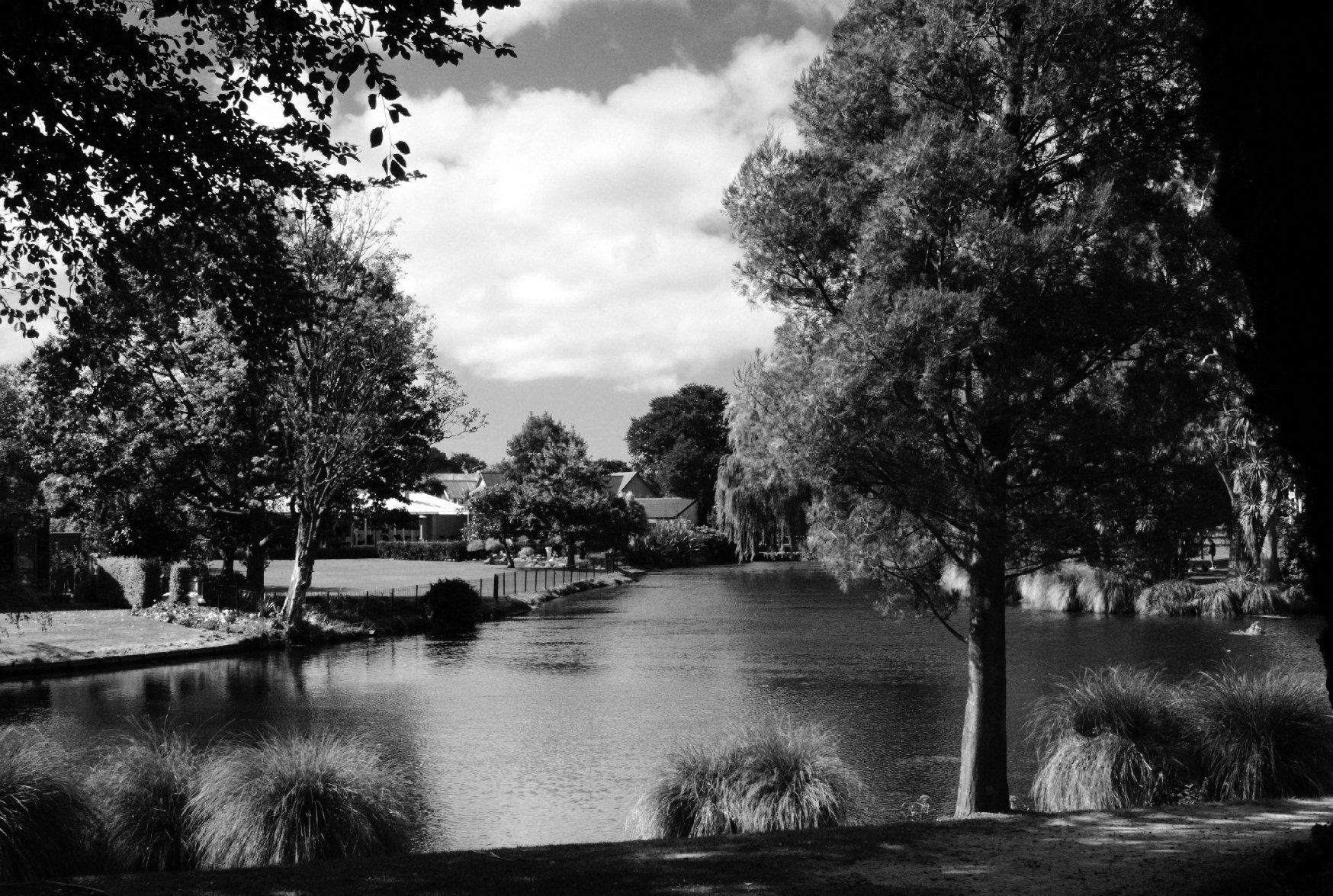
- The Avon River / Ōtākaro at Mona Vale
- Interactive map of Mona Vale
- Type: Public park
- Location: Christchurch, New Zealand
- Coordinates: 43°31′23.89″S 172°36′30.67″E
- Area: 4 hectares (9.9 acres)
- Created: 1899
- Operator: Christchurch City Council
- Status: Open all year

Heritage New Zealand – Category 1
- Official name: Mona Vale
- Designated: 7 April 1983
- Reference no.: 283

Heritage New Zealand – Category 2
- Official name: Mona Vale Gatehouse
- Designated: 7 April 1983
- Reference no.: 1799

Mona Vale, with its homestead formerly known as Karewa, is a public park of 4 ha in the Christchurch, New Zealand, in the suburb of Fendalton. The homestead and gate house are both listed as heritage buildings with Heritage New Zealand (NZHPT). The fernery and the rose garden, and pavilion with the setting of the park along the Avon River / Ōtākaro, add to the attractiveness of the property. It is one of the major tourist attractions of Christchurch.

== Geography ==
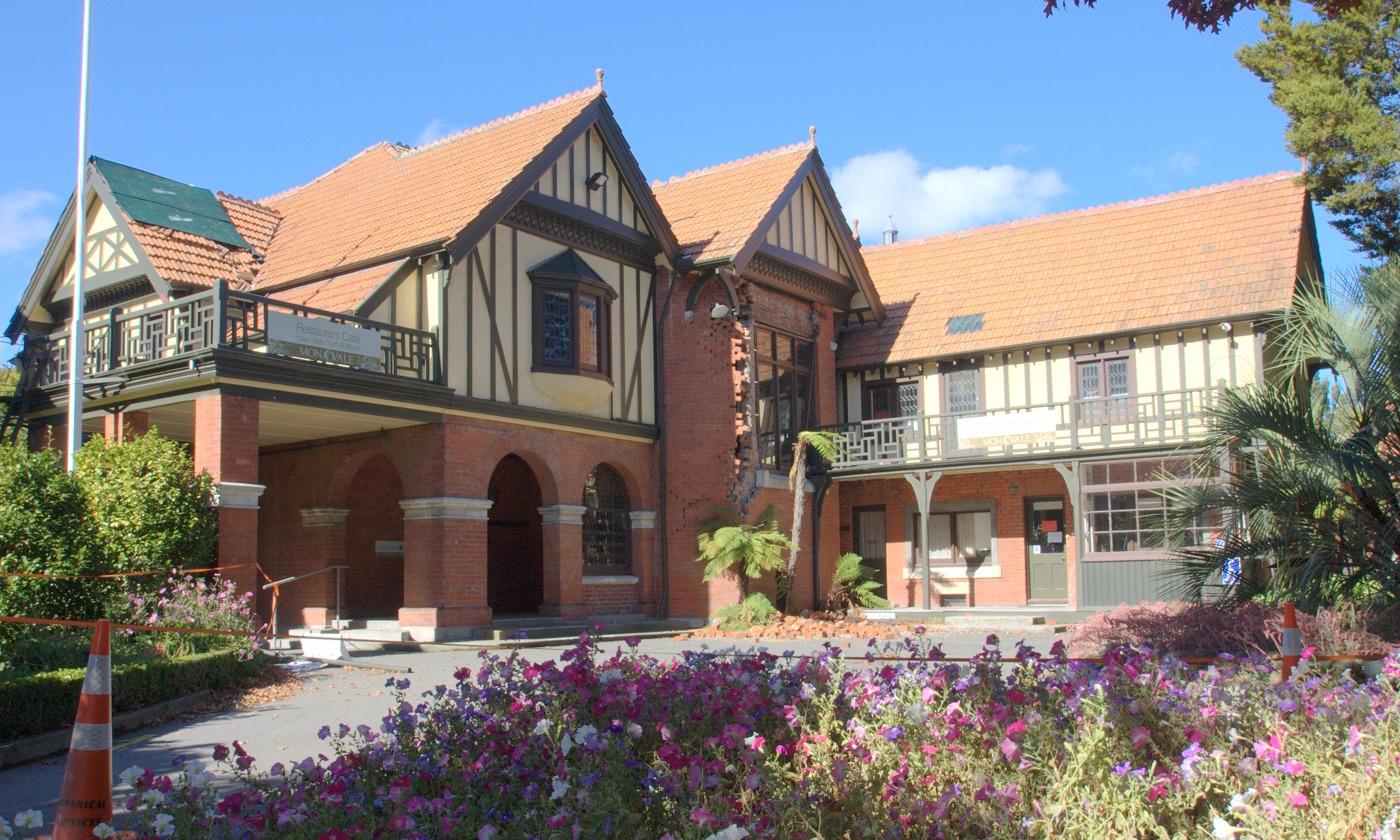
The Mona Vale homestead with earthquake damage from the February 2011 event

The western boundary of Mona Vale is the Main North Railway, and the Avon River forms the eastern border. In the north, the park is very narrow and starts at Fendalton Road. In the south, it extends to Matai Street East and has Christchurch Girls' High School as a neighbour.

The gardens cover four hectares.

== History ==
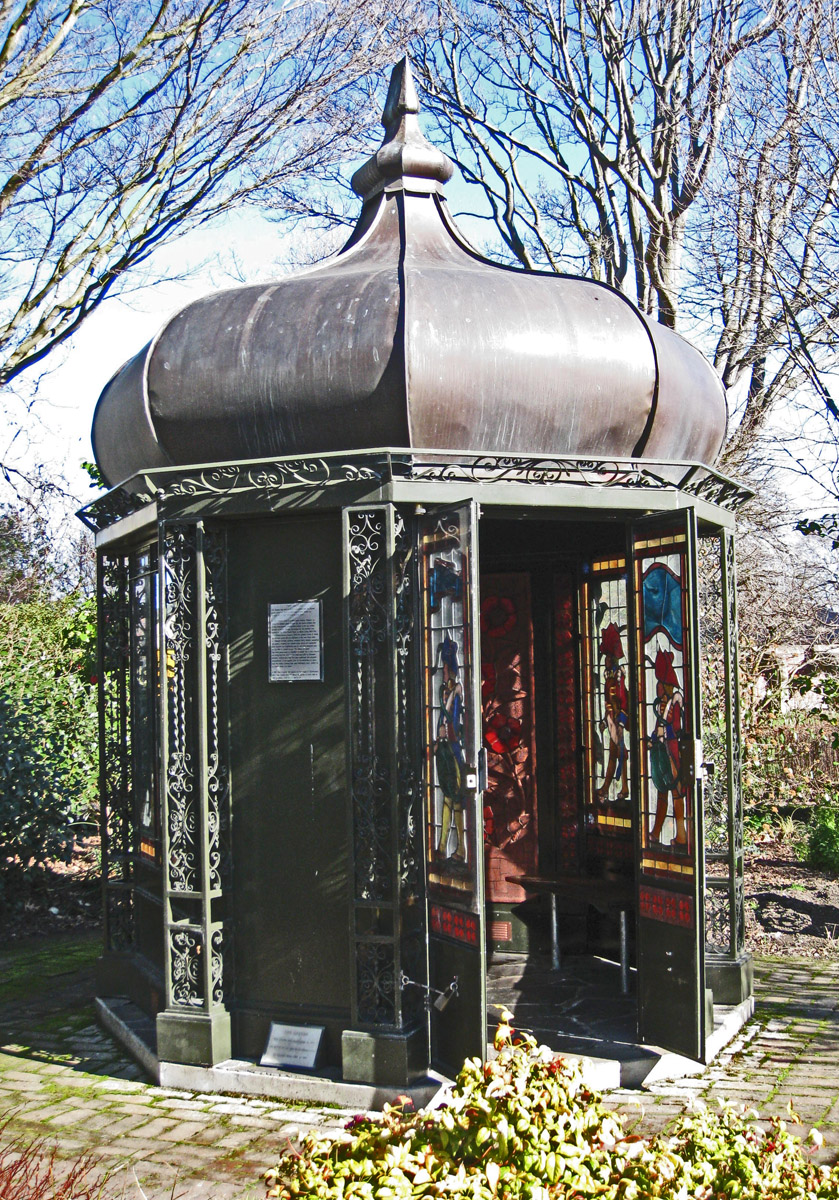
The gazebo at Mona Vale, conserved and restored by Stewart Stained Glass

The land initially belonged to the Deans brothers, whose homestead is Riccarton House in Riccarton. William Derisley Wood leased the land and built what became known as Wood's Mill. The weir in the Avon River was built in the 19th century and forms the Mona Vale mill pond, which still exists today.

Frederick Waymouth and his wife Alice purchased four acres of land, and had a homestead built in 1899–1900, designed by architect Joseph Maddison. Waymouth, who called the homestead Karewa, was the managing director of Canterbury Frozen Meats. Maddison was a well-known Christchurch architect, who amongst other buildings designed the freezing works in the Christchurch suburb of Belfast. It is thought that this connection between Waymouth and Maddison led to this commission.

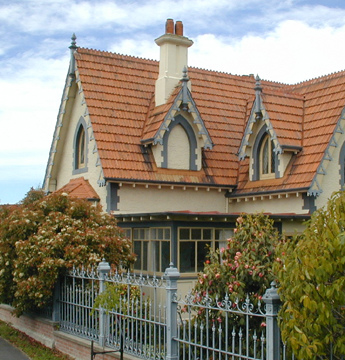
The Mona Vale gate house in 2007

Waymouth sold the property to Annie Quayle Townend in 1905, who renamed it Mona Vale after her mother's house in Tasmania. She was the daughter of a wealthy Canterbury run-holder, George Moore of Glenmark Station. She was his only surviving daughter and he had bequeathed her one million pounds, apparently making her New Zealand's richest woman at the time. Townend added nine acres of land to the property and had a gate house built just off Fendalton Road. After the New Zealand International Exhibition, held in Hagley Park, finished in 1907, she purchased the exhibition's fernery including its plants and had it reassembled at Mona Vale. The present collection of ferns were supplied by Landcare Research in Lincoln, the Christchurch Botanic Gardens and the private collection of the late Arthur Ericson. Townend also added the bathhouse to the property. She died in 1914.

In 1939 it was bought by Tracy Gough, and in 1941 by the firm, Gough, Gough and Hamer. Tracy Gough added to the beauty of the gardens by having a lily pond built and having rhododendrons and azaleas and many more exotic trees planted in the gardens.

The property was sold in 1962 to the Church of Jesus Christ of Latter-day Saints following the death of Gough, Gough and Hamer founder Tracy Gough. When the church wanted to sell Mona Vale to a New Zealand company intending to subdivide the property and to demolish the homestead, a public outcry resulted in community fund-raising. The Christchurch City Council and the Riccarton Borough Council bought Mona Vale in June 1969 for the purpose of turning it into a public park. The purchase of Mona Vale is credited to Christchurch mayor Ron Guthrey.

Until the 2010 Canterbury earthquake, the homestead was operated as a restaurant, café and function centre, often used for weddings. The building closed due to earthquake damage. It was officially reopened by Christchurch City Councillor James Gough, great-grandson of the former owner Tracy Thomas Gough, on 28 November 2016 following a two-year, $3.2 million repair and restoration. The Christchurch Civic Trust awarded a heritage renovation award in 2017 for the earthquake repair works.

== Heritage listings ==
The homestead was registered as a Category 1 heritage building by the NZHPT on 7 April 1983 with registration number 283. The gate house off Fendalton Road has its own heritage listing, and it was registered by NZHPT as Category II on 23 June 1983 with registration number 1799.

Photo gallery

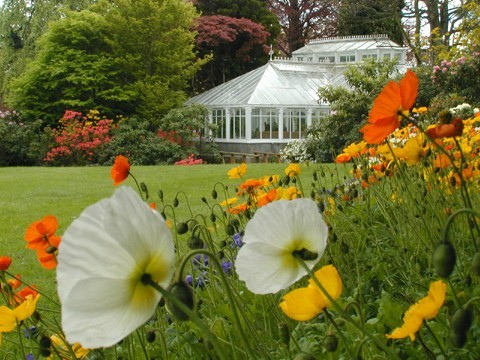
The bathhouse

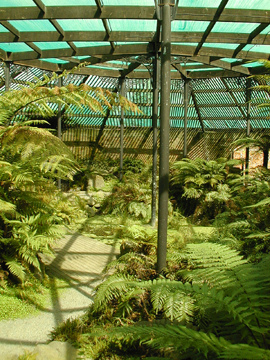
Inside the fernery

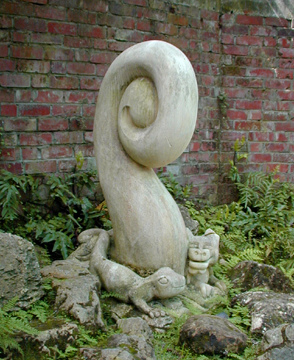
Statue of a fern in the fernery

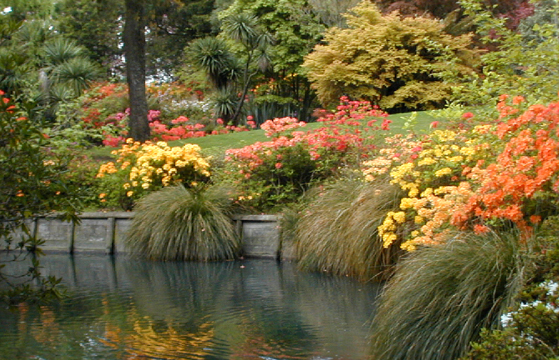
A border of Rhododendrons along the Avon River
