= Save Britain's Heritage =

British conservation group

- Nickname: SAVE
- Founded: 6 June 1975; 51 years ago
- Type: Charity
- Registration no.: England and Wales: 269129
- Location: 70 Cowcross Street, London, EC1M 6EJ
- Region served: England and Wales
- Owner: Marcus Binney CBE
- Revenue: £672,000 (2017)
- Website: www.savebritainsheritage.org

Save Britain's Heritage (styled as SAVE Britain's Heritage and also known as just SAVE) is a British charity, created in 1975 by a group of journalists, historians, architects, and planners to campaign publicly for endangered historic buildings. It is also active on the broader issues of preservation policy. SAVE is a registered charity governed by a board of trustees.

SAVE uses press releases, leaflets, reports, books, and exhibitions to advocate for decaying country houses, redundant churches and chapels, disused mills and warehouses, cottages and town halls, railway stations, hospitals, military buildings, and asylums.

SAVE was the first organisation to campaign for the introduction of the Thirty-Year Rule, which now makes post-war buildings in England and Wales eligible for listing.

== Goals ==
Save Britain's Heritage campaigns to protect British historic buildings from demolition or negligent alterations. SAVE states that they receive no statutory funding, and the organisation is sustained by private donations from individuals and charitable donors.

The charity aims to:

- Awaken public interest in and public appreciation of Britain's architectural heritage.
- To encourage the study of that heritage and related matters and to promote high standards of planning and architecture.
- To save from needless destruction or disfigurement, buildings or groups of buildings and designed landscapes of special historic or architectural interest.
- Where necessary, and with expert advice, take legal action to prevent major and needless losses.

== Achievements ==
SAVE has always placed a particular emphasis on the possibilities of alternative uses for historic buildings and has, on a number of occasions, prepared its own schemes for the re-use of threatened buildings. On repeated occasions, its proposals were instrumental in giving threatened buildings a renewed lease on life.

Many of its campaigns altered the way conservation now protects Britain's built heritage. SAVE's attack on insensitive shop fronts contained guidelines now adopted by many local planning authorities, and SAVE was the first organisation to campaign for the introduction of the Thirty-Year Rule, which now makes outstanding post-war buildings in England and Wales eligible for listing.

SAVE was instrumental in saving buildings such as:

- Calke Abbey in Derbyshire, acquired by the National Trust in 1983.
- The Grange, Northington in Hampshire—the surviving parts were acquired and restored by English Heritage.
- Peninsula Barracks in Winchester—converted to private residential use in 1998.
- Tyntesfield—acquired by the National Trust in 2002.
- Brandon railway station in Suffolk, in 2020.

It also established charitable trusts to restore the following:

- All Souls Church, Halifax, a church by George Gilbert Scott.
- Bank Hall, Bretherton, a Jacobean mansion, built from handmade brick for the Bannastre Family in 1608.
- Barlaston Hall in Staffordshire, a Palladian villa by Sir Robert Taylor.
- 6 Palace Street, the oldest building in Caernarfon outside the castle.

However, campaigns are not always successful. Its campaign in 1977–1978 to save the Baltic Exchange building and its collection for the nation failed as it was unable to stop the demolition of historic buildings in the City of London to make way for the new Baltic Exchange and could not prevent the disposal of the interior of the Baltic Exchange, which had been damaged by a Provisional Irish Republican Army bomb in 1992.

It has previously campaigned to save the General Market Buildings of Smithfield Market on Farringdon Road and the Royal Aircraft Establishment in Farnborough. As of October 2022, it was campaigning to protect Marks & Spencer's Marble Arch store on Oxford Street. SAVE has since taken the case to a public inquiry at Westminster City Hall after being called in by Secretary of State Michael Gove in June 2022.

The group has lobbied against the addition of dense housing in Manchester. The group has argued that the skyscrapers in the city centre of Manchester, which are set to house 100,000 people by 2025, reflect "outdated thinking that regards towers as symbols of success."

== SAVE's Buildings at Risk Register ==
SAVE maintains an electronic register, first created in 1989, of over 1400 "Buildings at Risk" and publishes a print catalogue of the register annually. The BaR, as it is also known, includes information on threatened unlisted and Grade II listed buildings (outside London) throughout England, Scotland, and Wales. Buildings are considered to be at risk if they are under threat from demolition or neglect.

The register is continuously updated: newly identified 'at risk' buildings are added, while others are removed either after restoration or demolition. The register also summarises the development history of each building, detailing the progress of any restoration or other proposals.

== Publications ==
Save Britain's Heritage has published many campaigning books and leaflets, including:

- The Concrete Jerusalem (1976),
- Elysian Gardens (1979),
- Vanishing London: A Catalogue of Decay (1979),
- The Fall of Zion (1980)
- Lost Houses of Scotland (1980)
- The Country House: To Be or Not To Be (1982)
- Estates Villages Who Cares? (1983)
- Crisis at Saltaire (1986)
- Pavilions in Peril (1987)
- Bright Future: The Reuse of Industrial Buildings (1990)
- Stop the Destruction of Bucklesbury (1992)
- Beacons of Learning (1995)
- Mind over Matter (1995)
- Silence in Court (2004)
- The Guildhall Testimonial (2006)
- The Big Saves: Heroic transformations of great landmarks (2016)
- Too good to lose: Historic schools at risk (2018)
- Canterbury Take Care! (2019)
- Departing Stores: Emporia at Risk (2022)

These publications advocate the preservation and reuse of, amongst other things, nonconformist chapels, redundant Anglican churches, Victorian mental hospitals, country houses, gardens and outbuildings, and industrial buildings.

SAVE also publishes an action guide, to assist campaigners with setting up their own groups to advocate the case for particular buildings. An exhibition highlighting the first 30 years of its work was held at the Victoria and Albert Museum in 2005.

== See also ==
- Society for the Protection of Ancient Buildings
