= Trevor Ogilvie-Grant, 4th Baron Strathspey =

The Right Honourable The Lord Strathspey Bt
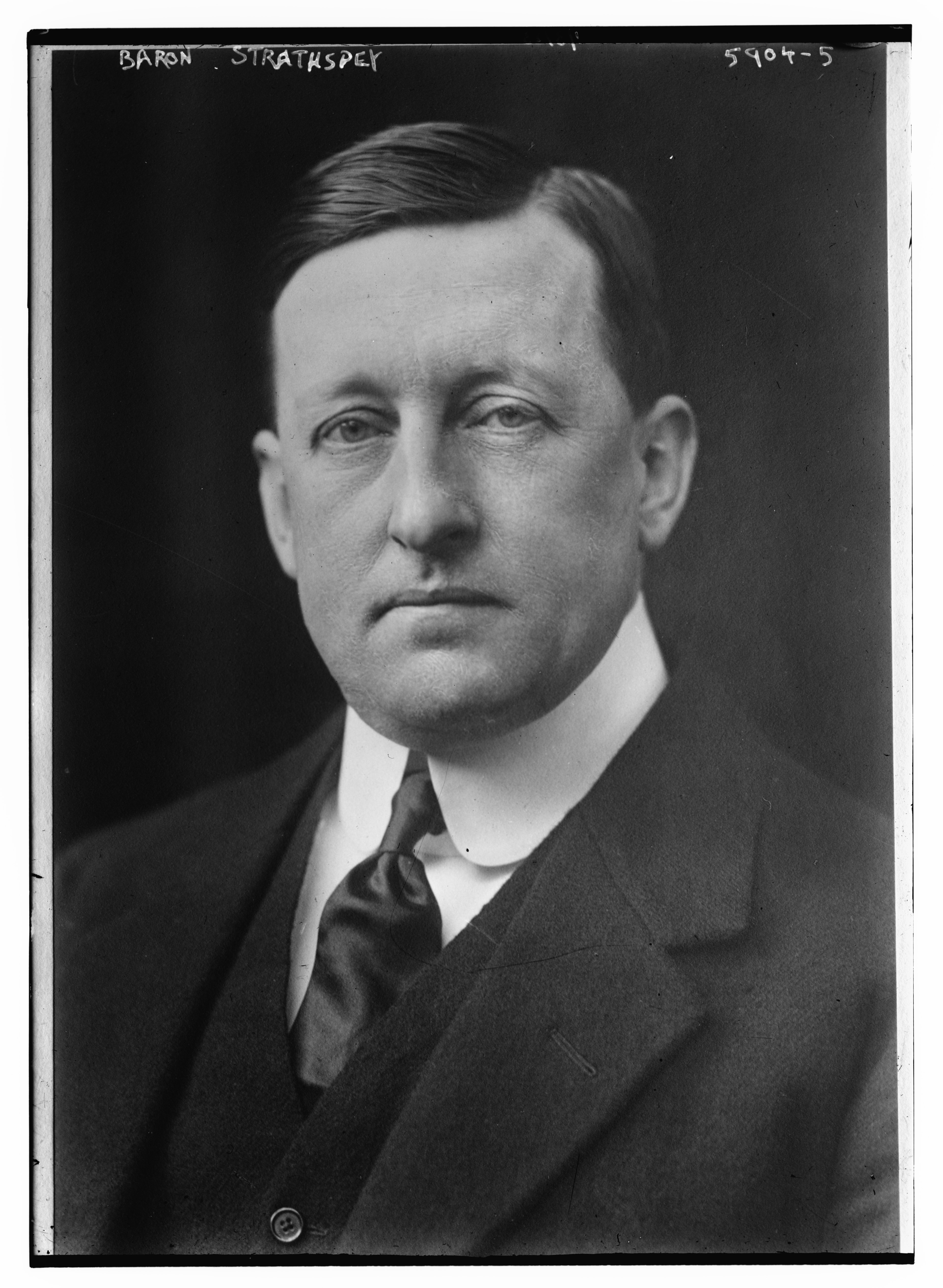

Member of the House of Lords Lord Temporal
- In office 1915–1948
- Preceded by: The 3rd Baron Strathspey
- Succeeded by: The 5th Baron Strathspey

Personal details
- Born: 2 March 1879 Oamaru, New Zealand
- Died: 11 November 1948 (aged 69) Brighton, Sussex, England
- Spouse(s): Alice Hardy-Johnston (m. 1905; died 1945) Elfrida Minnie Fass (m. 1947; died 1948)
- Children: Patrick Grant, 5th Baron Strathspey; Hon. Lena Onslow
- Parent(s): Francis Ogilvie-Grant, 10th Earl of Seafield; Anne Evans

Trevor Ogilvie-Grant, 4th Baron Strathspey (2 March 1879 – 11 November 1948) was a British peer concerned with colonial affairs in the House of Lords. He is numbered as the 31st Chief of Clan Grant.

== Early life ==
Strathspey was born on 2 March 1879 in Oamaru, North Otago, New Zealand. He was the second son of Francis Ogilvie-Grant, 10th Earl of Seafield and Anne Trevor Corry Evans, daughter of Major George Evans, 47th Regiment, a scion of the Barons Carbery. He had six siblings, including his elder brother, James Ogilvie-Grant, 11th Earl of Seafield.

He was educated at Warwick House preparatory school in Christchurch (where his elder brother James had also attended), Waitaki Boys' High School and St John's College. For many years, he was the President of the English branch of the Waitaki Old Boys' Association.

== Career ==
Ogilvie-Grant was employed by the New Zealand Civil Service. He was also worked as a postmaster.

Upon the death of his elder brother, James Ogilvie-Grant, 11th Earl of Seafield, in 1915, he succeeded to the barony of Strathspey in the Peerage of the United Kingdom and emigrated to Britain and took his seat in the House of Lords. He also succeeded in the baronetcy of Colquhoun. The earldom of Seafield, however, was inherited by his brother's only child, Lady Nina Ogilvie-Grant, who became the 12th Countess of Seafield.

== Personal life ==
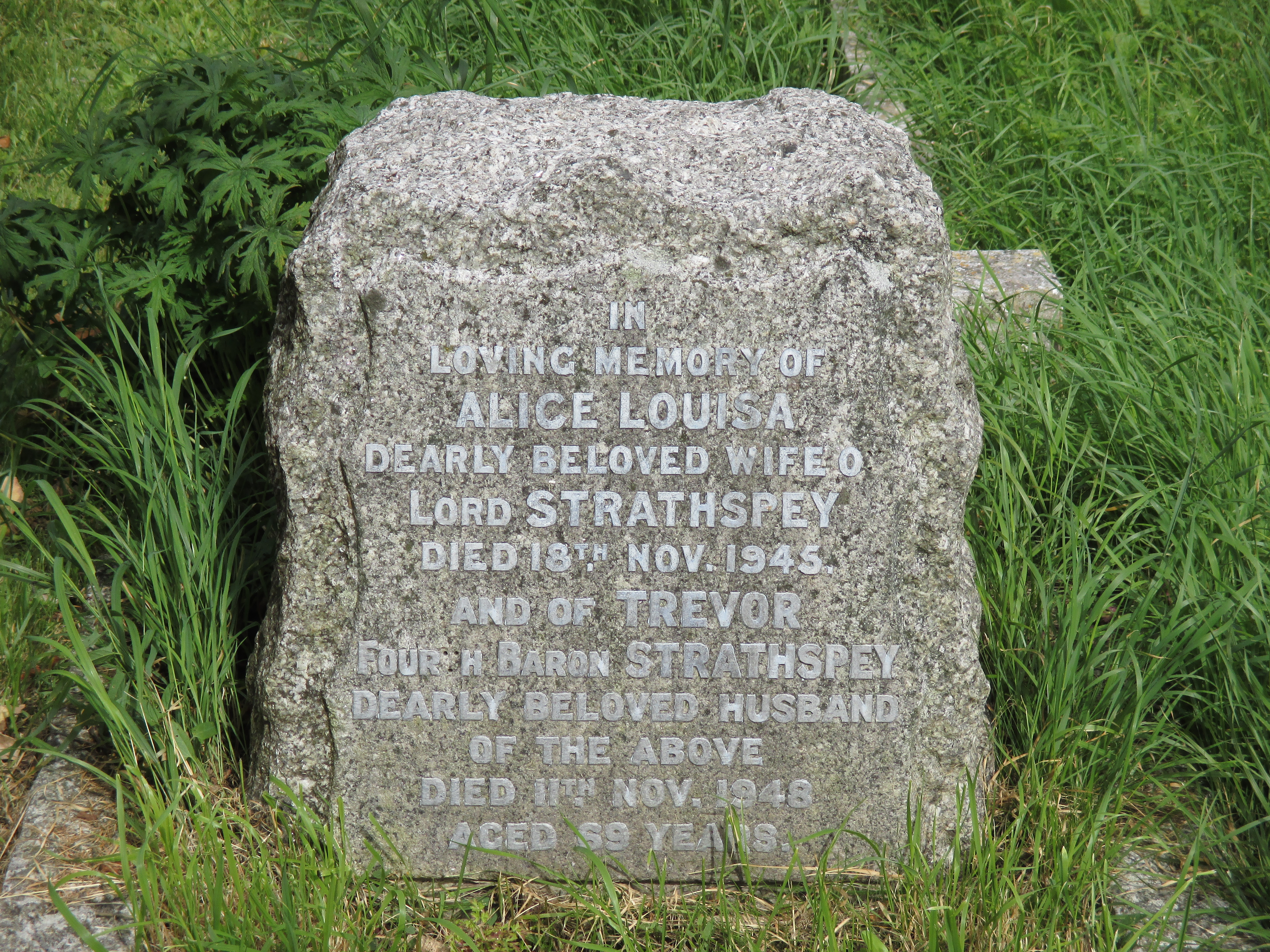
The gravestone of the 4th Baron Strathspey, Trevor Ogilvie-Grant, and his first wife in Brighton, Sussex

He married Alice Louisa Hardy-Johnston, daughter of Thomas Masterman Hardy-Johnston of Christchurch, on 19 December 1905 in Tauranga. After his father's death, his mother and her family had lived in Tauranga for some time. Strathspey and his wife made Wellington their home after the wedding. Before her death on 18 November 1945, they had two children in New Zealand:

- Hon. Lena Barbara Joan Ogilvie-Grant (1907–1981), who married Herbert Frank Onslow, son of Rev. Matthew Richard Septimus Onslow (a scion of the Onslow baronets), in 1934.
- (Donald) Patrick Trevor Grant, 5th Baron Strathspey (1912–1992), who married Alice Bowe, daughter of Francis Bowe, in 1938. They divorced in 1951 and he married Olive Amy Grant, daughter of Wallace Henry Grant, in 1951.

His second marriage was in March 1947 to Elfrida Minnie Fass, daughter of Gordon Cloete of Cape Town in South Africa, and widow of Colonel Capron, York and Lancaster Regiment.

Lord Strathspey died at Brighton on 11 November 1948. His second wife died on 19 July 1949.

Peerage of the United Kingdom
Preceded by James Ogilvie-Grant	Baron Strathspey; 1915–1948	Succeeded by Donald Patrick Trevor Grant of Grant
