= James Ogilvie-Grant, 11th Earl of Seafield =

Scottish noble (1876–1915)

The Right Honourable The Earl of Seafield Bt JP DL
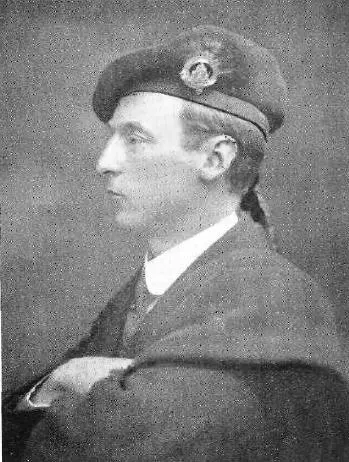

Personal details
- Born: 18 April 1876 Oamaru, New Zealand
- Died: 12 November 1915 (aged 39) Flanders, France
- Cause of death: Died of wounds
- Resting place: Lijssenthoek Military Cemetery
- Spouse: Mary Townend (m. 1898)
- Children: Nina Ogilvie-Grant, 12th Countess of Seafield
- Parent(s): Francis Ogilvie-Grant, 10th Earl of Seafield; Anne Evans

Military service
- Rank: Captain
- Unit: Queen's Own Cameron Highlanders
- Battles/wars: World War I

Captain James Ogilvie-Grant, 11th Earl of Seafield, JP, DL (18 April 1876 – 12 November 1915), styled Viscount Reidhaven in 1888, was a Scottish peer and soldier. He is numbered as the 30th Chief of Clan Grant.

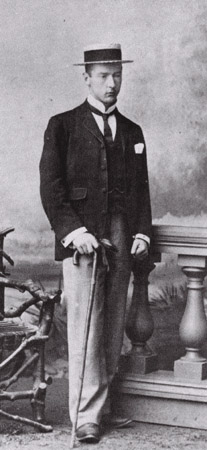
The 11th Earl of Seafield

== Early life ==
Seafield was born on 18 April 1876 in Oamaru, North Otago, New Zealand. He was the eldest son of Francis Ogilvie-Grant, 10th Earl of Seafield and Anne Trevor Corry Evans, daughter of Major George Evans. He had six siblings, including his brother, Trevor Ogilvie-Grant.

He started his education at Warwick House preparatory school in Christchurch. He then attended Christ's College and Lincoln College. He succeeded to the earldom of Seafield and as 30th Chief of Clan Grant on his father's death in 1888. He lived in Auckland for a time before his marriage in 1898.

== Career ==
Seafield served as a Justice of the Peace for Banffshire, Morayshire, and Inverness-shire. He was a Deputy Lieutenant for the County of Elgin.

Seafield served as a lieutenant in the Canterbury Yeomanry Cavalry, New Zealand Forces. He was commissioned as a second lieutenant in the 3rd (Militia) Battalion, the Bedfordshire Regiment, on 21 June 1902. He fought in World War I as a captain in the 3rd Battalion, Queen's Own Cameron Highlanders, and was then attached to the 5th Battalion. The Cameron Highlanders' regimental commander was Sir Donald Cameron of Lochiel who described Seafield as "brave as a lion". In November 1915, he was supposed to be on leave from action, but his leave was cancelled and he died on 12 November 1915, aged 39, from wounds received in action.

== Personal life ==
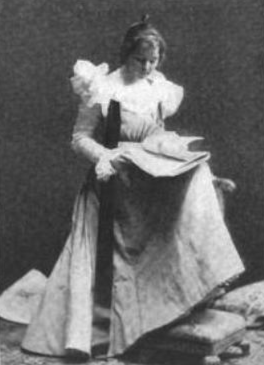
Photograph of his wife, Mary Elizabeth Nina Townend, from The Sketch, 1898

On 22 June 1898 at Christchurch, Seafield married Mary Elizabeth Nina Townend, daughter of Dr. Joseph Henry Townend (1847–1902), JP and heiress of Annie Quayle Townend. They had one daughter:

- Lady Nina Caroline Ogilvie-Grant (1906–1969), who married Derek Herbert Studley-Herbert in 1930.

Lord Seafield died on 12 November 1915, aged 39, from wounds received at Flanders in Belgium. He is buried at Lijssenthoek Military Cemetery. Seafield was succeeded in the barony of Strathspey, the baronetcy of Colquhoun and as Chief of Clan Grant by his younger brother Hon. Trevor Ogilvie-Grant. The earldom and the other subsidiary Scottish peerage titles could be passed on to female heirs and, along with the vast estates, were inherited by his daughter. He was the grandfather of Ian Ogilvie-Grant, 13th Earl of Seafield.

Peerage of Scotland
Preceded by Francis William Ogilvie-Grant	Earl of Seafield; 1888–1915	Succeeded by Nina Caroline Ogilvie-Grant
Peerage of the United Kingdom
Preceded by Francis William Ogilvie-Grant	Baron Strathspey; 1888–1915	Succeeded by Trevor Ogilvie-Grant
