= James Ogilvie-Grant, 9th Earl of Seafield =

Scottish peer

The Right Honourable The Earl of Seafield Bt MP DL
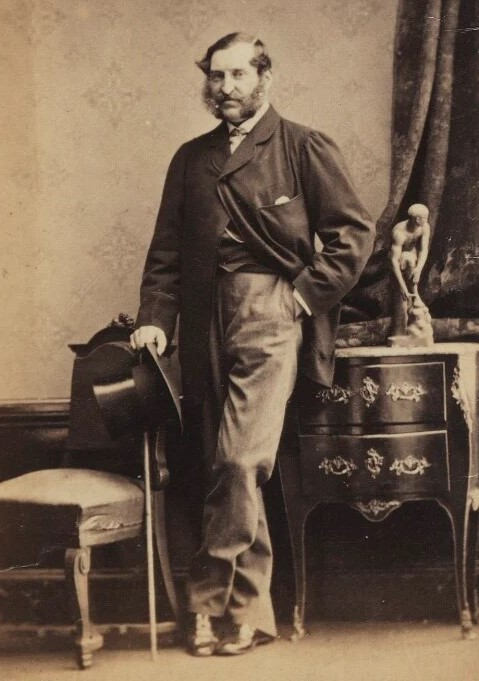

Member of Parliament for Elginshire and Nairnshire
- In office 1868–1874
- Preceded by: Charles Cumming-Bruce
- Succeeded by: The Viscount Macduff

Personal details
- Born: 27 December 1817 Cullen, Banffshire, Scotland
- Died: 5 June 1888 (aged 70) Kensington, London, England
- Spouse(s): Caroline Evans (m. 1841; died 1850) Constance Abercromby (m. 1853; died 1872)
- Parent(s): Francis Ogilvie-Grant, 6th Earl of Seafield; Mary Anne Dunn

Lieutenant Colonel James Ogilvie-Grant, 9th Earl of Seafield, DL (27 December 1817 – 5 June 1888), known as The Hon. James Ogilvie-Grant from 1840 to 1884, was a Scottish peer, Conservative politician and soldier.

Seafield was the fourth son of Francis Ogilvie-Grant, 6th Earl of Seafield, and Mary Ann Dunn. He was educated at Harrow. He achieved the rank of lieutenant colonel in the British Army, serving with the Elginshire Volunteers. At the 1868 general election he was elected to the House of Commons as MP for Elginshire and Nairnshire as a Conservative, a seat he held until his defeat at the 1874 general election. In 1884, he succeeded his nephew, Ian Charles Ogilvie-Grant, 8th Earl of Seafield, as ninth Earl of Seafield. A few months later he was created Baron Strathspey, of Strathspey in the Counties of Inverness and Moray, in the Peerage of the United Kingdom. This title, a revival of the barony created for his elder brother in 1858, gave him an automatic seat in the House of Lords.

Lord Seafield was married three times. He married firstly Caroline Louisa Evans (1820–1850), daughter of Eyre Evans, of Kilmallock, County Limerick. He married secondly Constance Helena Abercromby (1829–1873), daughter of Sir Robert Abercromby, 5th Baronet, in 1853. She died in 1872 and Seafield married thirdly Georgina Adelaide, daughter of General Frederick Nathaniel Walker and sister of General Edward Forestier-Walker.

Lord Seafield died in June 1888, aged 70, and was succeeded by his eldest son from his first marriage, Francis William Ogilvie-Grant. His second son, Lt.-Col. The Hon. Robert Abercromby Ogilvie-Grant (1855–1925), was an officer in the Gordon Highlanders.

He is buried at the mausoleum at Duthil Old Parish Church and Churchyard, just outside the village of Duthil, Inverness-shire.

Parliament of the United Kingdom
Preceded by Charles Lennox Cumming Bruce	Member of Parliament for Elginshire & Nairnshire; 1868–1874	Succeeded by The Viscount Macduff
Peerage of Scotland
Preceded by Ian Charles Ogilvie-Grant	Earl of Seafield; 1884–1888	Succeeded by Francis William Ogilvie-Grant
Peerage of the United Kingdom
New creation	Baron Strathspey; 1884–1888	Succeeded by Francis William Ogilvie-Grant
