= Francis Ogilvie-Grant, 10th Earl of Seafield =

Scottish peer

The Right Honourable The Earl of Seafield
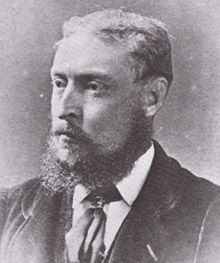

Personal details
- Born: 9 March 1847 Kilmallock, County Limerick, Ireland
- Died: 3 December 1888 (aged 41) Oamaru, New Zealand
- Resting place: Oamaru Old Cemetery
- Spouse: Anne Evans (m. 1874)
- Children: James Ogilvie-Grant, 11th Earl of Seafield; Trevor Ogilvie-Grant, 4th Baron Strathspey
- Parent(s): James Ogilvie-Grant, 9th Earl of Seafield; Caroline Evans
- Education: Harrow School

Francis William Ogilvie-Grant, 10th Earl of Seafield (9 March 1847 – 3 December 1888), styled Viscount Reidhaven from 1884 to 1888, was a Scottish peer who emigrated to New Zealand.

== Early life ==
Seafield was born on 9 March 1847 in Kilmallock, County Limerick, Ireland. He was the eldest son of The Hon. James Ogilvie-Grant, by his first wife, Caroline Louisa Evans (1820–1850), daughter of Eyre Evans, Esq. of Ash Hill, and Anna Maunsell. After his education at Harrow, he served as a midshipman in the Royal Navy and then joined the merchant navy.

== Career ==
Seafield (then known as Frank Grant) arrived in New Zealand in 1870. He bought a farm in the Waiareka Valley in a locality known as Te Aneraki to the west of Oamaru in North Otago. He lost his money through his farming pursuits, and in the late 1870s the impoverished family moved to Oamaru town.

He stood twice for election in the Oamaru electorate to the New Zealand House of Representatives. The first time, he contested the 1884 election against the incumbent, Samuel Shrimski. When Shrimski was appointed to the Legislative Council in 1885, Grant contested the resulting 1885 by-election, but lost against Thomas Hislop.

In 1884 following the death of his cousin, Ian Ogilvie-Grant, 8th Earl of Seafield, the title devolved to the former's uncle (Frank's father). As the heir apparent to the earldom, Grant unexpectedly became Viscount Reidhaven. When his father died on 5 June 1888, he became the Earl of Seafield in the Peerage of Scotland. A subsidiary title was Baron Strathspey in the Peerage of the United Kingdom.

Seafield died on 3 December 1888 from a heart condition. He is buried at the Oamaru Old Cemetery. He was succeeded by his oldest son in the earldom, James Ogilvie-Grant, 11th Earl of Seafield, who at the time was twelve years old. He was fatally wounded in World War I in 1915, and was succeeded in the barony of Strathspey, the baronetcy of Colquhoun and as Chief of Clan Grant by his younger brother Hon. Trevor Ogilvie-Grant. The earldom and the other subsidiary Scottish peerages could be passed on to female heirs, and were inherited by Nina Ogilvie-Grant, 12th Countess of Seafield.

After Lord Seafield died, his wife lived for some time in Auckland and Tauranga before moving to England. She died at Brighton on 16 October 1935.

== Personal life ==
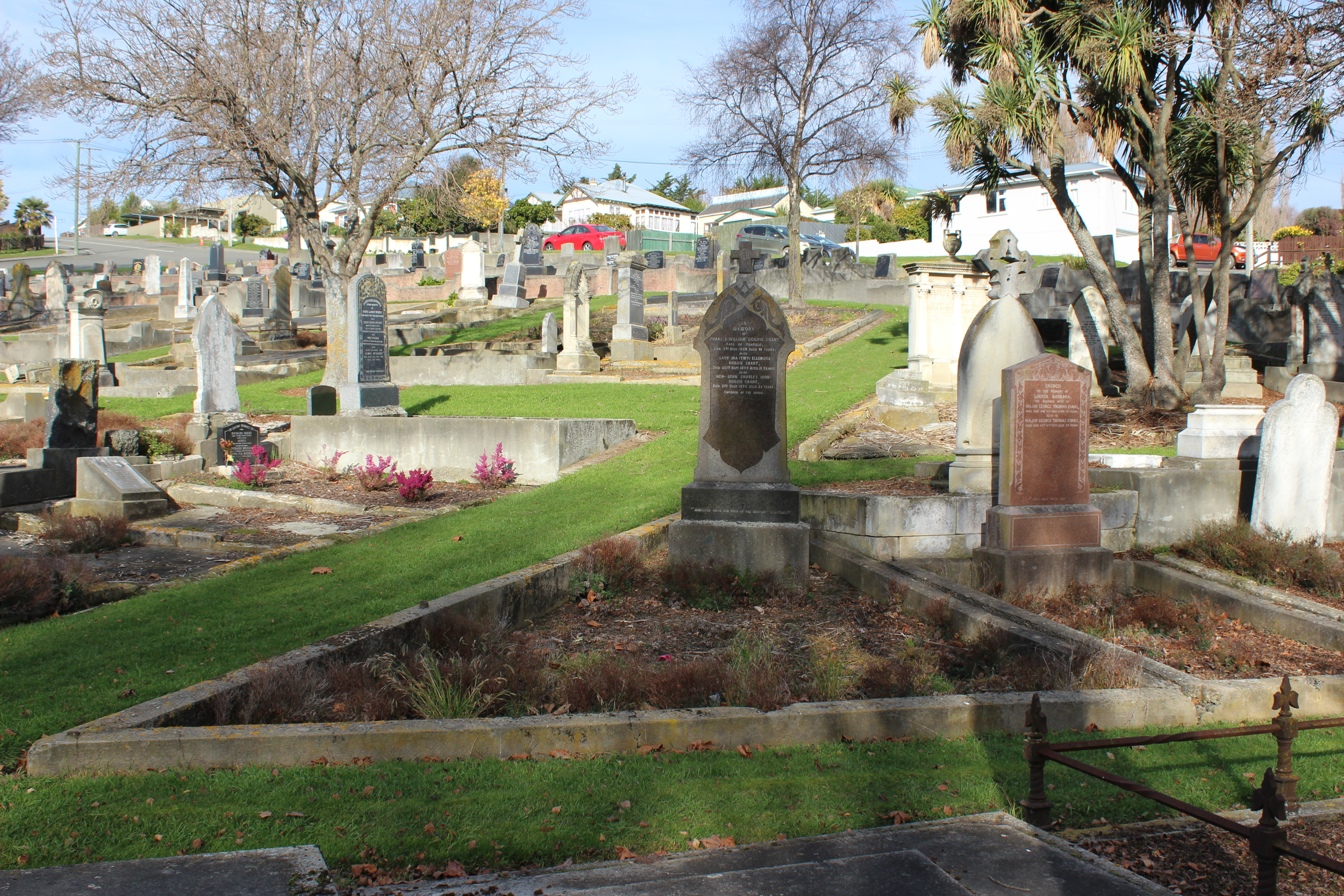
Grave of Francis William Ogilvie Grant at the Old Oamaru Cemetery, New Zealand

On 24 November 1874, Grant married his first cousin Anne Trevor Corry ("Nina") Evans, daughter of Major George Thomas Evans and Louisa Barbara Corry. They had seven children:

- James Ogilvie-Grant, 11th Earl of Seafield (1876–1915), married the heiress Mary Elizabeth Nina Townend, daughter of Dr. Joseph Henry Townend, JP of Christchurch, in 1898.
- Lady Caroline Louisa Ogilvie-Grant (1877–1945), died unmarried.
- Trevor Ogilvie-Grant, 4th Baron Strathspey (1879–1948), married Alice Louisa Hardy-Johnston, daughter of Thomas Masterman Hardy-Johnston, in 1905.
- Lady Sydney Montagu Ogilvie-Grant (1882–1944), married Rev. William Spring Rice in 1912.
- Lady Ina Eleanora Ogilvie-Grant (1882–1893), who died young.
- Lady Nina Geraldine Ogilvie-Grant (1884–1951), married Sir Lees Knowles, 1st Baronet in 1915.
- Hon. John Charles Ogilvie-Grant (1887–1893).

Peerage of Scotland
| Preceded by James Ogilvie-Grant | Earl of Seafield; 1888 | Succeeded by James Ogilvie-Grant |
Peerage of the United Kingdom
| Preceded by James Ogilvie-Grant | Baron Strathspey; 1888 | Succeeded by James Ogilvie-Grant |
