= James Bain (minister) =

Scottish minister

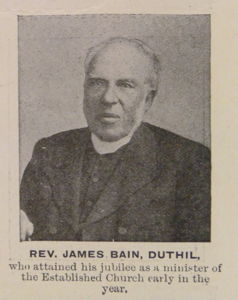
- Photograph of the Rev. James Bain, minister of Duthil, as published in 'The Northern Scot' to celebrate his jubilee in the ministry of the Church of Scotland.
- Title: Moderator of the Presbytery of Abernethy (1897)

Personal life
- Born: 24 September 1828
- Died: 13 November 1911 (aged 83) Duthil, Inverness-shire, Scotland
- Home town: Dingwall, Highland
- Spouse: Janet (Jessie) W. Paterson
- Education: Edinburgh University

Religious life
- Religion: Christian
- Denomination: Church of Scotland (The Established Church)
- Church: Cross, Lewis (1859); Kilfinan (1860–1875); Lochalsh (1875–1877); Duthil (1877–1911)

Rev. James Bain (1828–1911) was a minister of the established Church of Scotland and a noted controversialist who, though conservative in theology, sought to oppose a culture of deference to landlords in the Scottish Highlands and especially the influence of the Seafield Estates. In general, he defended the cause of the poor and of the 'masses' against the 'classes', utilising a slogan popularised by William Ewart Gladstone.

== Biography ==
Bain was born in 1828, son of John Bain, a carrier contractor of Dingwall, and Isabella Macdonald. Fluent in both Scottish Gaelic and English, he was educated at the University of Edinburgh, and served in the following Highland parishes:

- Cross, Lewis; ordained 27 September 1859
- Kilfinan, Argyll, inducted 24 November 1860
- Lochalsh, inducted 24 November 1875
- Duthil, Strathspey, Scotland, inducted 30 August 1877 and died still in office there 13 November 1911.

On 20 February 1866, James Bain married Janet (Jessie) Wood Watson Paterson, daughter of James Paterson M.D. of Glasgow. They had four children. (The dates of death of the two sons are unknown.)

- James Paterson (born 1866)
- Isabella (Ella) Macdonald (born 1868 died 1890)
- Alexander Thomas Niven (born 1872)
- Jessie Watson (born 1874, died 1956)

James Bain is buried in St Clement's Churchyard, Dingwall, with his father and mother, his daughter Ella and his wife Jessie.

== Controversies ==
=== Duthil Manse, Churchyard and Mausolea ===
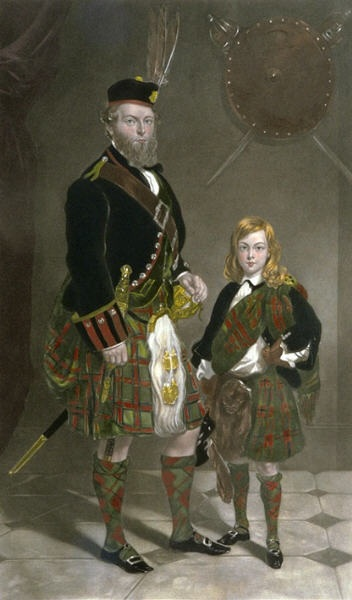
The 7th Earl of Seafield.

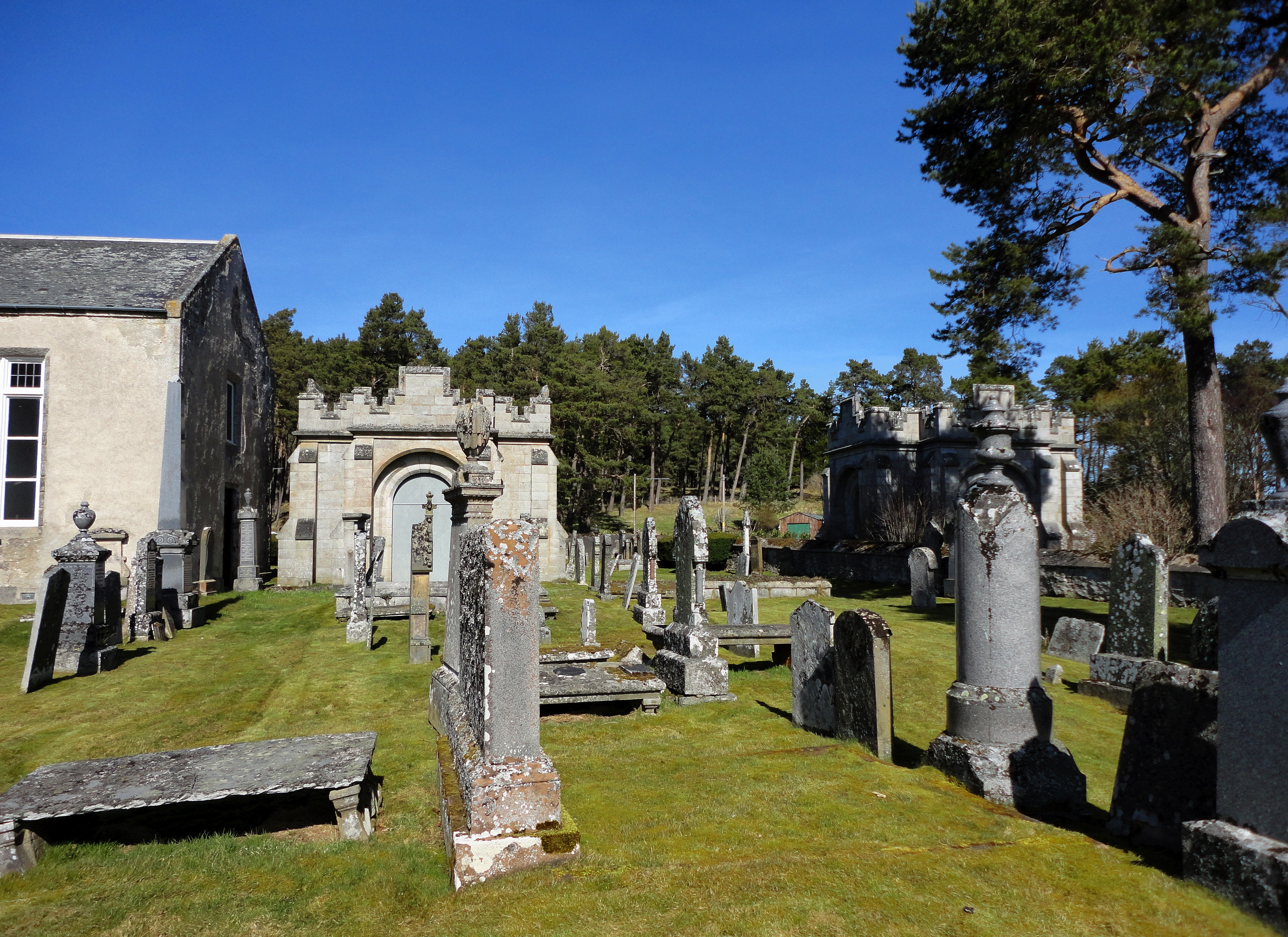
Churchyard and mausolea adjacent to the church (left) and outside the churchyard (right)

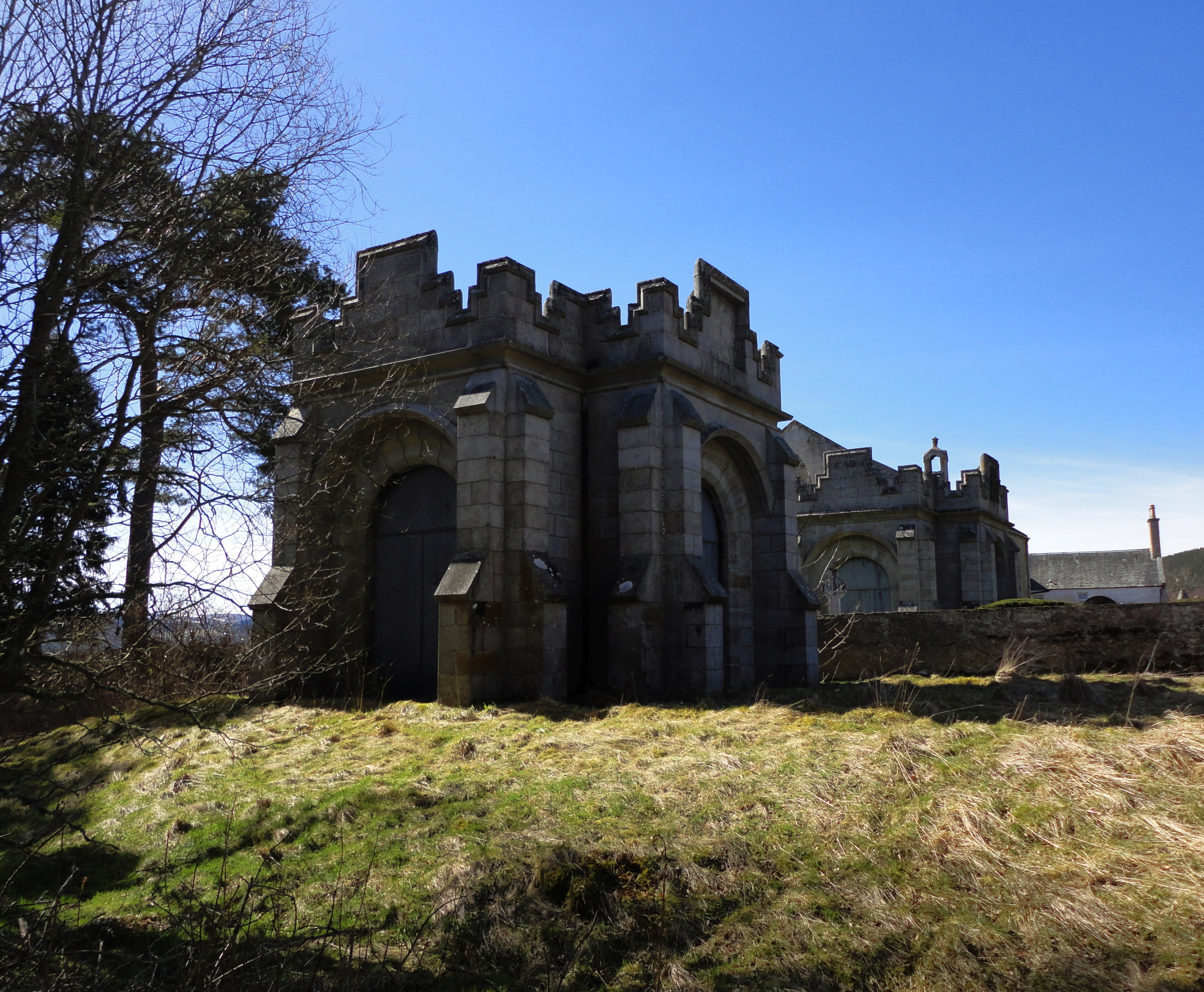
Mausolea outside the churchyard (left) and adjacent to the church (right)

Bain became well known for his campaigns against the proprietor of the Seafield Estates (1884–1911), Rt. Hon. Caroline, Countess Dowager of Seafield, widow of John Ogilvy-Grant, 7th Earl of Seafield; and more generally against the predominating influence of the Estate in public affairs in Strathspey. In 1885 he sued Lady Seafield, attempting to prevent her from building the second Grant Mausoleum in Duthil Old Parish Church and Churchyard, but lost the case.

In 1887 he again sued Lady Seafield, seeking—again unsuccessfully—to cancel or reduce the contract by which the Estate gained from the Church the land on which the second mausoleum was sited.

Throughout his ministry in Duthil, he challenged the Estate to bring the Manse of the established Church into a habitable condition for himself and his family, eventually winning this case in the Court of Session in 1894. Bain held that the Manse was insanitary because of its proximity to an insanitary churchyard; he said the churchyard was insanitary because it was too shallow and too full and because it hosted an insanitary Mausoleum; and the mausolea were insanitary because they held coffins unburied, retained above ground. Only with regard to the Manse did he find official support.

James Cameron, Balnacruie, Tullochgribban, known as 'The Duthil Author' and a supporter of the Estate, was publicly critical of Rev. James Bain. Cameron published a pamphlet, 'A challenge to prove the True Historic Church of Scotland' which contained the following accusations against James Bain:

Need it be observed here what were the circumstances that more immediately led to the shipwreck, so to speak, of this congregation? This at the time had been fully known over all the north, yea, over the whole kingdom. The great strife, quarrels and litigations in connection with the glebe, the new Mausoleum, the Manse, the churchyard, the porch, the fighting at its door, the rotten smells, above all, the hole-ing of the graves with a crowbar, which made many men and women run wild, the coffins which were in the graves holed and broken through. … What or who caused all this is not a question with any person. The whole affair had been so very wild and heathenish in its nature that any detailed account thereof cannot be given. … Strife and contention is the work of the “evil spirit”, whoever is guilty of it. I feel altogether compelled from a conscientious point of view to ask what respect or sympathy did Mr Bain show to the Countess Dowager of Seafield in her sad and heavy bereavement - lost her only dear husband and her only dear son, noblemen who were famous as good and noble proprietors, and representatives of a most famous clan, as well as unspeakable loss to their estates and people?'

=== Napier Commission ===
The Napier Commission, officially the Royal Commission of Inquiry into the Condition of Crofters and Cottars in the Highlands and Islands, was a royal commission and public inquiry into the condition of crofters and cottars in the Highlands and Islands of Scotland. At its hearings at Kingussie, October 1883, James Bain gave evidence attacking the policies of the Seafield Estates as oppressive of the tenantry.

=== Cromdale ===
In 1887 James Bain intervened in the proceedings of the parish of Cromdale, where the congregation were divided as to which candidate they should elect as their new minister. Stating his case in the Presbytery of Abernethy, the Synod of Moray and to the civil Court of Session, he successfully defended the right of the majority of ordinary members to elect the minister they choose. In his speech at one hearing, reported in the 'Elgin Courant and Courier', he took up the language of 'the masses; and 'the classes' then popularised by the Liberal Prime Minister, William Ewart Gladstone M.P.:

The Cromdale case had been all along one of the classes against the masses - a way of carrying on matters still too prevalent in Strathspey, where the classes had their parasites to back and support them. ... It is not for any selfish or aggressive object that I am moving in these matters. It is to bring the mighty and the powerful to repentance and to get them to do justice. I think it is far more my duty to attack the high and mighty than to attack the poor and the simple. If you get the high and the mighty to do what is right, they will be setting a good example. ... Some people would yet boldly act on the principle that might was right. So long as it was the poor that suffered it did not matter, ... while the classes well knew that the parasites were at their back to do as the classes would wish it done. ... Be that as it may, the people of Cromdale were ready to prove that ... the Presbytery of Abernethy - were the very parties who, if they had not robbed, had “jockeyed” them out of their legal rights in connection with a matter more precious far to them than gold, namely, the sacred right secured to them by law of electing and settling among them the minister of their choice. But the Presbytery of Abernethy thought proper to be actors art and part with the classes, ... to defeat the pious aims and wishes of these poor suffering people.

=== Duthil and Cromdale school boards ===
Elected for a number of terms to the Duthil School Board and also to the neighbouring Cromdale School Board, on the Duthil Board James Bain attempted to widen access to primary education by advocating support for side-schools additional to the Parish Schools of Duthil and Deshar. On the Cromdale Board, he supported moves to develop secondary education at Grantown Grammar School to allow students from Grantown-on-Spey and area to obtain university entrance qualifications.

== Assessments by contemporaries ==
In 1899 James Cameron, 'The Duthil Author', considered that Mr Bain had wholly wrecked the Duthil congregation of the Church of Scotland:

When Mr. Bain came to Duthil he had been, as he ought to be, at the head and helm of affairs in the parish. Did he steer the ship as he ought to have done? This is the all-important question. He did nothing of the kind. A storm and a black cloud, accompanied with a dark thick mist, had come over the horizon, which endangered both ship and cargo, and the man at the helm, being not a great navigator, not a great expert at the compass, lost his track and steered the vessel upon rocks ahead and became a total shipwreck, and the cargo, intended for "Immanuel's Land," had been all lost.

In 1909 an article in the 'Dundee Courier' celebrated the jubilee of Bain's ordination to the ministry.

It requires a strong man to minister for a long period amid the petty strifes of a Highland parish. Such a one is the Rev. James Bain ... Perhaps no living minister has preached to larger Gaelic congregations than Mr Bain. He was a power in the land in his young days, and would often have congregations of from 5000 to 7000. The services were held outside the church, and lasted sometimes from midday to six or seven in the evening. To conduct a service of such length required a physically strong man, but Mr Bain in his youth was a splendid specimen of manhood. The people came in carts from Abernethy, Grantown, and as far distant as Cromdale. ... Mr Bain's conservatism in matters of Church worship is widely known. He believe the introduction of instrumental worship and hymns is contrary to the Act of 1707 and that to permit this innovation would be perjury. At the same time, he has no objection to organs and hymns in themselves Mr Bain is in sympathy with the movement for emancipation of women. He favour votes for women on the terms enjoyed by men, and is inclined to be in favour of women in the pulpit.

In 1910 the Rev. Donald Macleod published a comment on Rev. James Bain, saying he was: 'An able and ardent evangelical preacher, a conservative theologian, and an opponent of all innovations in the manner or mode of worship’.

In 1911 the Kirk Session of Duthil, seeking to comfort the bereaved Mrs Bain and her daughter, put on record their assessment of their deceased minister:

The Kirk Session recall with gratitude the long term of service which he was permitted by God to render to the Church in the Parish of Duthil. It is now 34 years since he was called by the free choice of the people to the parochial charge of the Parish, and through all those years he has preached the word of God with the earnestness of deep conviction. Encouraging the good, fearless in rebuking vice and exhorting all to faith and good works, for more than a generation he went out and in among his people, caring for the poor, ministering to the sick, bringing hope to the dying and the consolation of the gospel to those who were sorrowing. The Session recall the robustness of his faith and the fervour of his expositions, which in the earlier days of his ministry drew great crowds to listen to his preaching. Mr Bain loved the old paths and the ancient ways and walked along them with consistent fidelity from first to last. The Session record their sense of his keen intellectual acumen, his great dialectical skill, his rare ability in defending positions which he deemed it his duty to hold, his indomitable courage and the straightforwardness and courtesy and absence of rancour from his nature. In the course of his long career Mr Bain engaged in many and bitter controversies but the Session regard it as a testimony to his integrity of purpose and sincerity of character that he kept at the end the respect and esteem of all, and the love of those who knew him best.

== Publication ==
James Bain self-published the following pamphlet: 'The Seafield Mausoleums and Duthil Churchyard case. A specimen of how officials tamper with the law in Scotland when they want to serve the great. Correspondence between J. Bain, Henry D. Littlejohn and Sir William Harcourt.' Elgin, 1885.
