= Ian Ogilvie-Grant, 8th Earl of Seafield =

Scottish nobleman

The Right Honourable Ian Ogilvie-Grant
- Earl of Seafield and Baron Strathspey
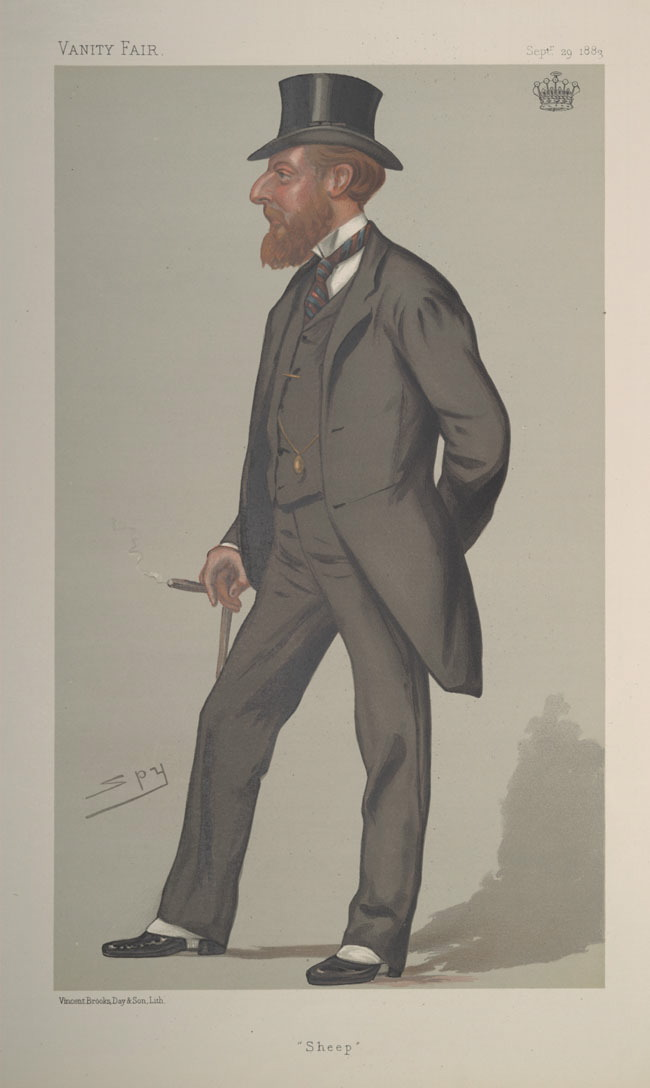
- "Sheep". Caricature by Spy published in Vanity Fair in 1883.

- Coat of arms
- Tenure: 1881–1884
- Predecessor: John Ogilvie-Grant, 7th Earl of Seafield
- Successor: James Ogilvie-Grant, 9th Earl of Seafield
- Born: 7 October 1851; Moray Place, Edinburgh
- Died: 31 March 1884 (aged 32)
- Buried: Seafield Mauseoleum
- Father: John Ogilvie-Grant, 7th Earl of Seafield
- Mother: Hon. Caroline Stuart

Ian Charles Ogilvie-Grant, 8th Earl of Seafield (7 October 1851 – 31 March 1884), styled Viscount Reidhaven from 1853 until 1881, was a Scottish nobleman. He is numbered as the 27th Chief of Clan Grant.

== Biography ==
=== Early life ===
Ian Charles Ogilvie-Grant was born at Moray Place, Edinburgh, the only child of John Charles Ogilvie-Grant, 7th Earl of Seafield and his wife the Hon. Caroline Stuart, daughter of Lord Blantyre. He was educated at Eton College. During his minority, he was titled Lord Reidhaven and the Master of Grant. The main residence for Ian growing up, as for his father and mother, was Cullen House in Cullen; Castle Grant, the traditional seat of the Clan Grant, was also occupied when his Strathspey estates were visited. Ian and his mother were very close, with her obituary stating that the "bond of affection which united him and his mother was of a strength and tenderness almost passing belief".

=== Public life ===
On 8 December 1869, Lord Reidhaven was commissioned as a cornet and sub-lieutenant into the 1st Regiment of Life Guards; he was promoted lieutenant in October 1871 and retired from the army in 1877. He held the office of Deputy lieutenant (DL) of Inverness-shire. He succeeded his father as Earl of Seafield and Chief of Clan Grant in 1881.

On succeeding to his father's seat in the House of Lords, Seafield adhered to the Conservatives. In the pamphlet published 'In Memoriam' on his death, the editors wrote:

Though a constitutionalist, he was by no means a Tory of the old school. From his earliest years he took a most active part, in every political movement. He knew we live in a progressive age, and that as the nation advances in intelligence, by means of education, certain reforms become necessary, and when the proper time arrives, ought to be carried out. What he did most strenuously object to was hasty legislation, and especially legislation which might lead to the disintegration of the Empire, and to lowering of the National prestige abroad. The attempt to admit an avowed Atheist to the House of Commons was utterly repugnant to his whole nature, and no one rejoiced more than he did at the exclusion of that Atheist.

Like his father, Lord Seafield was ordained as an elder of the Church of Scotland for the Parish of Inverallan and in the Presbytery of Abernethy. He was due to attend the General Assembly of 1884 as a Commissioner for Abernethy when he died. 'In Memoriam' covered this area of his life:

On many public occasions he avowed his adherence to the principle involved in a National recognition of Religion. His regard for the Church of Scotland was profound. It was evidenced by his becoming one of her active Office-bearers, and, had his life been spared, he would during the past Session of the General Assembly, have taken his seat therein, as a member of that Venerable House.

=== Death and succession ===
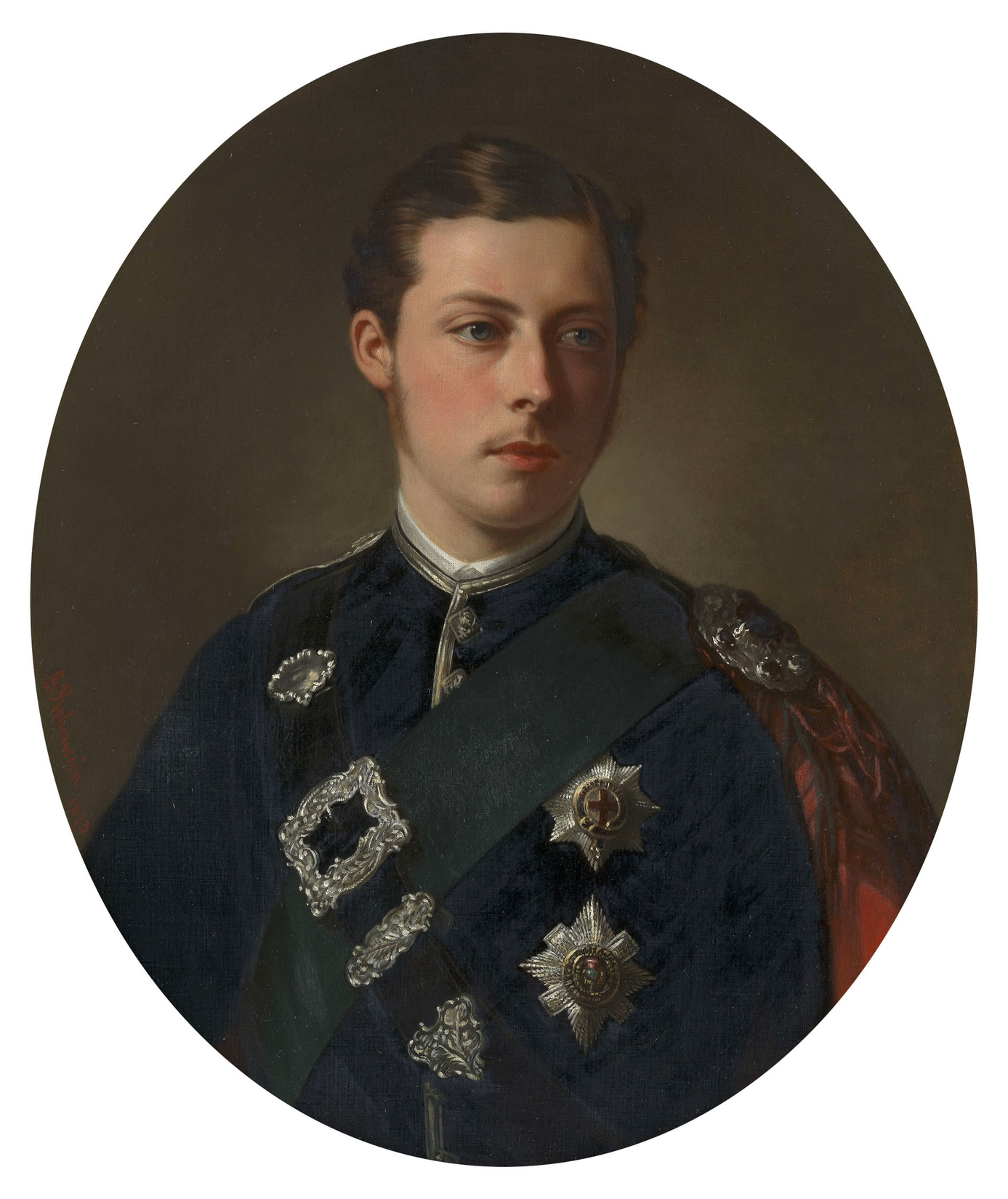
Prince Leopold, Duke of Albany and Lord Seafield spent their last Sunday of 1883 together at Claremont.

On 31 March 1884, Lord Seafield died in London following an operation for aneurysm. His unexpected death occurred several days after the equally unexpected death of Seafield's good friend, Prince Leopold, Duke of Albany.

As Ian was unmarried and had no children, by a will made in 1882 Ian left his mother as the heir to his estates: Caroline, the Countess Dowager, therefore was proprietor of the Seafield and Grant Estates until her death in 1911. Meanwhile, the 8th Earl's titles of honour were inherited by his uncle, James Ogilvie-Grant, who was otherwise the nearest male heir. The Seafield title was thus for some generations separated from the lands and properties that had maintained it. This situation had been made possible because the 7th Earl had completed the legal procedure of disentailing the estate.

== Memorials ==
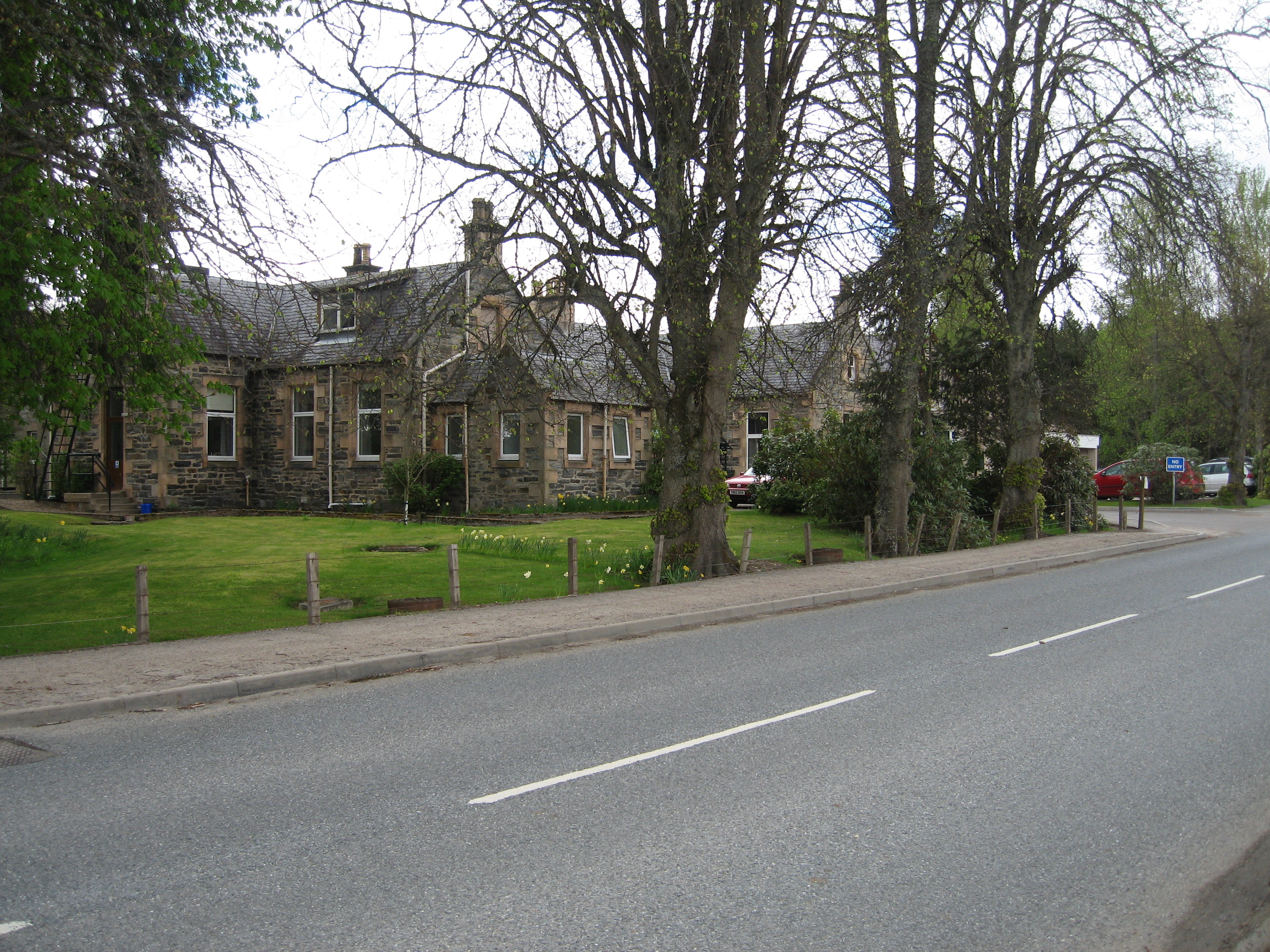
Ian Charles Community Hospital, Grantown-on-Spey

After the death of her son, Lady Seafield's priorities as Countess Dowager, besides overseeing the management of her estates, were to 'take steps for the perpetuation of (her son's) memory and that of her husband in schemes of enduring utility'. The first of these was a public hospital in Grantown-on-Spey, named the Ian Charles Hospital in his memory:

Thus, fifteen months after his death, in May 1885 there was opened at Grantown-on-Spey the Ian Charles Hospital. The erection and endowment of such a hospital had been arranged by the Countess Dowager and her son. It had been little more than founded when the Earl died, and his sorrowing mother brought the undertaking to a completion. All who know the capital of Strathspey know the place well.... The hospital was and is fitted with all necessary conveniences and comforts for the treatment and care of the sick, and has been of untold benefit to the Speyside district of the Seafield estates.

The Church of Scotland parish church in Grantown-on-Spey is named 'The Seafield Memorial Church', having been erected (on the site of predecessors) at a cost of £7000 by Caroline Stuart, Countess of Seafield, in memory of both her husband John Charles and her son, Ian Charles; it opened on 1 May 1886.

Lord Seafield is buried at the Seafield Mausoleum at Duthil Old Parish Church and Churchyard, just outside the village of Duthil, Inverness-shire.

== Sources ==
- Anonymous (1911). The Right Honourable Caroline Countess of Seafield. A tribute volume, 'Mostly reprinted from Banffshire Journals of October 10 and 17'.

Peerage of Scotland
Preceded by John Charles Ogilvie-Grant	Earl of Seafield; 1881–1884	Succeeded by James Ogilvie-Grant
Peerage of the United Kingdom
Preceded by John Charles Ogilvie-Grant	Baron Strathspey; 1881–1884	Extinct
