= Patrick Grant (Indian Army officer) =

Indian Army officer

Field Marshal Sir Patrick Grant GCB GCMG
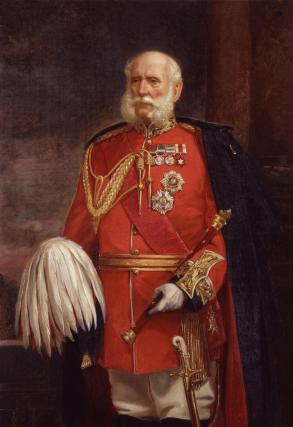
- Born: 11 September 1804; Carrbridge, Inverness-shire, Scotland
- Died: 28 March 1895 (aged 90); Chelsea, London, England
- Military career
- Allegiance: United Kingdom
- Branch: Indian Army
- Service years: 1820–1877
- Rank: Field Marshal
- Commands: Madras Army; Bengal Army
- Conflicts: Gwalior campaign; First Anglo-Sikh War; Second Anglo-Sikh War; Indian Mutiny
- Awards: Knight Grand Cross of the Order of the Bath; Knight Grand Cross of the Order of St Michael and St George

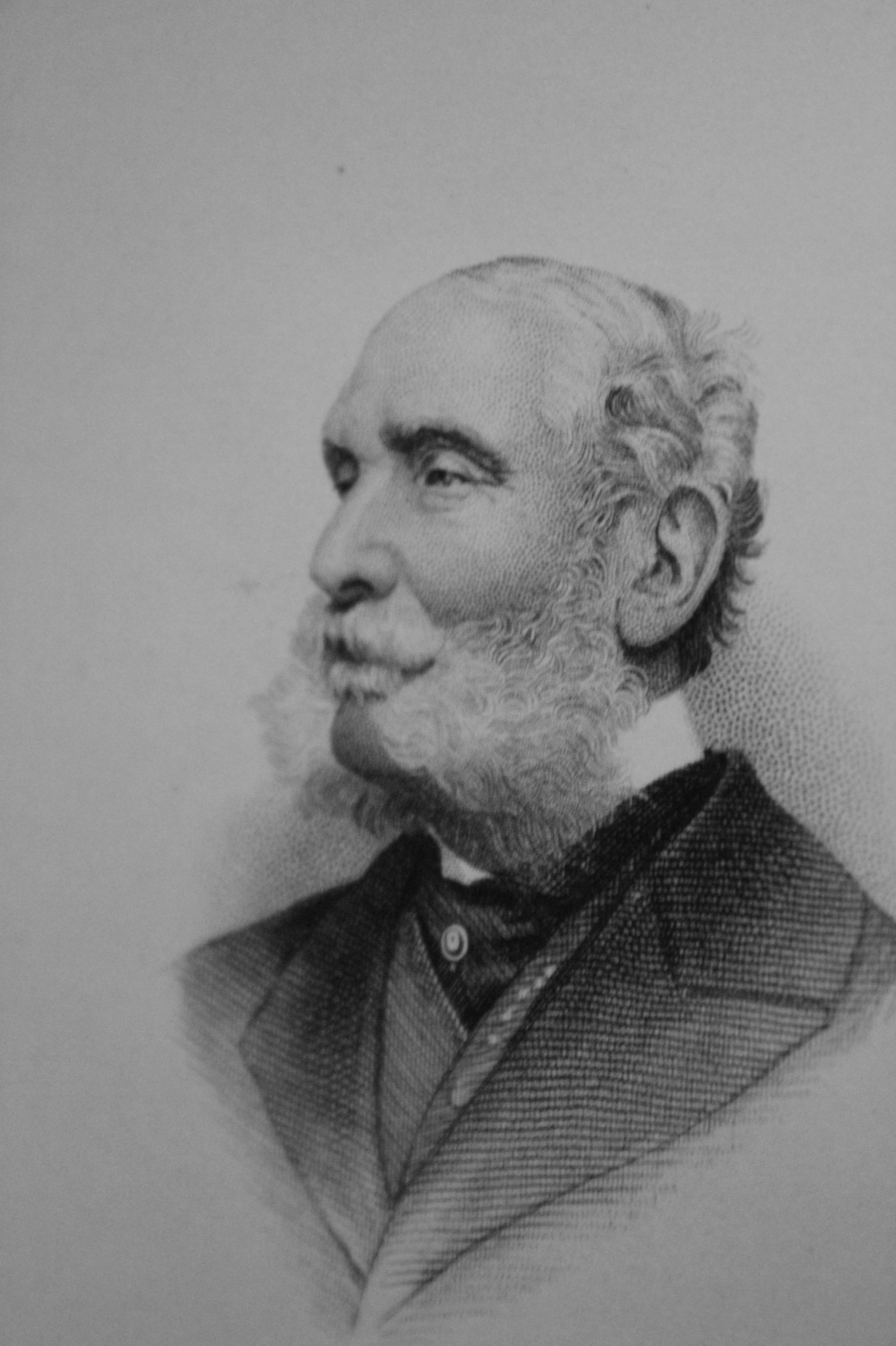
Sir Patrick Grant

Field Marshal Sir Patrick Grant, GCB, GCMG (11 September 1804 – 28 March 1895) was a senior British Army officer who served in India. He fought at the Battle of Maharajpore during the Gwalior campaign, at the Battle of Mudki, the Battle of Ferozeshah and the Battle of Sobraon during the First Anglo-Sikh War and at the Battle of Chillianwala and the Battle of Gujrat during the Second Anglo-Sikh War. During the Indian Mutiny, as acting Commander-in-Chief, India, he directed the operations against the mutineers, sending forces under Henry Havelock and James Outram for the relief of Cawnpore and Lucknow. He later became Governor of Malta.

== Military career ==
Born at Auchterblair, near Carrbridge, Inverness-shire, Grant was the second son of Major John Grant of the 97th Regiment of Foot and Anna Trapaud Grant. He joined the Bengal Native Infantry as an ensign on 16 July 1820 and was promoted to lieutenant on 11 July 1823 and to captain on 14 May 1832. He became a brigade major in Oudh in 1834 and, having raised the Hariana Light Infantry in 1836, he became second assistant in the adjutant-general's department of the Bengal Presidency in 1838.

Grant served under Sir Hugh Gough as deputy assistant adjutant-general at the Battle of Maharajpore in December 1843 during the Gwalior campaign. Promoted to brevet major on 30 April 1844, he served as acting adjutant-general of the army at the Battle of Mudki in December 1845 (where he was twice wounded), at the Battle of Ferozeshah also in December 1845 and at the Battle of Sobraon in February 1846 during the First Anglo-Sikh War. He became deputy adjutant-general of the Bengal Army in March 1846 and was promoted to brevet lieutenant colonel on 3 April 1846.

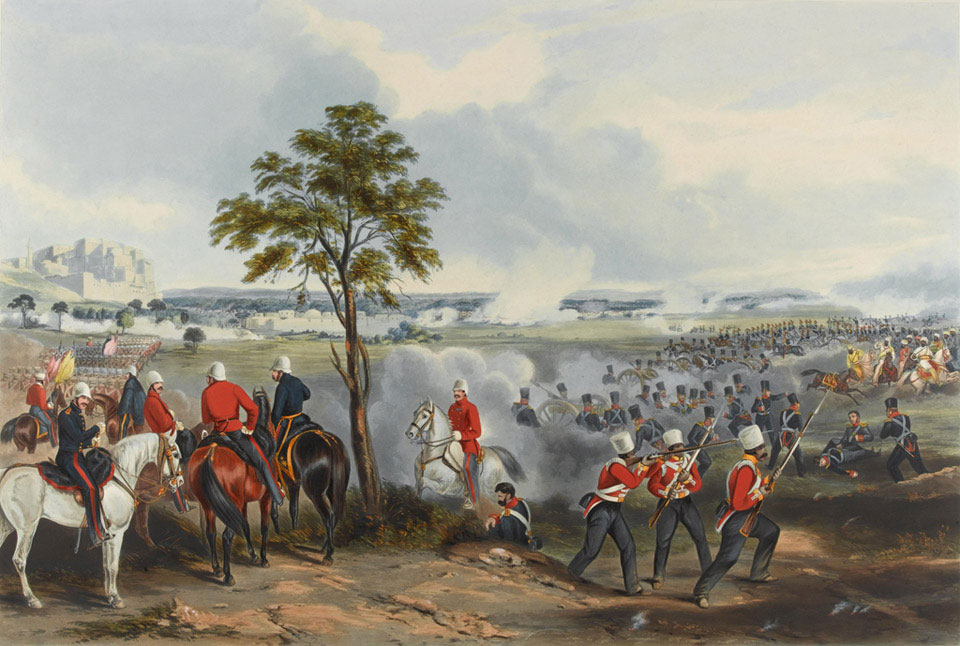
The Battle of Gujrat, at which Grant saw action, during the Second Anglo-Sikh War

Grant also took part in the Battle of Chillianwala in January 1849 and the Battle of Gujrat in February 1849 during the Second Anglo-Sikh War. He later served under Sir Charles Napier in operations against the Pathan tribes in Kohat in 1850. Appointed aide-de-camp to the Queen and promoted to brevet colonel on 2 August 1850, he was further promoted to brevet major-general on 28 November 1854 before becoming commander-in-chief of the Madras Army with the local rank of lieutenant-general on 25 January 1856.

When General George Anson died of cholera on his march against the mutineers in May 1857, Grant, as senior commander in India, was summoned to Calcutta to become acting Commander-in-Chief, India. From Calcutta he directed the operations against the mutineers, sending forces under Henry Havelock and James Outram for the relief of Cawnpore and Lucknow. Although the Viceroy of India, Lord Canning, had recommended that Grant be confirmed in the role of commander-in-chief, Sir Colin Campbell had already been nominated as Anson's successor. So on the arrival of Campbell from England in August 1857, Grant returned to command the Madras Army again.

Grant returned to England in January 1861 and was promoted to the substantive rank of colonel on 14 November 1861 and to lieutenant-general on 24 October 1862. In February 1864 he was appointed to a Royal Commission formed to inquire into the best mode of realizing the value of booty of war. He became Governor of Malta in 1867 and was promoted to full general on 19 November 1870.

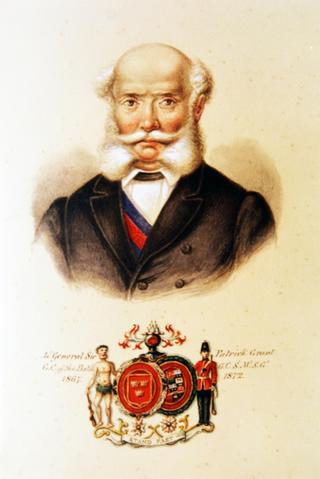
Sir Patrick Grant, Governor of Malta (1867–1872)

Grant was also colonel of the 104th Regiment of Foot, of the 78th (Highlanders) Regiment of Foot and then of the Royal Horse Guards. He was placed on the retired list on 1 October 1877 and promoted to field marshal on 24 June 1883.

Grant also served as governor of the Royal Hospital Chelsea from February 1874 until his death there on 28 March 1895. He is buried in Brompton Cemetery, London. A memorial plaque to Grant can be found in Duthil Old Parish Church and Churchyard, just outside the village of Duthil, Inverness-shire, which now also serves as a Clan Grant Centre.

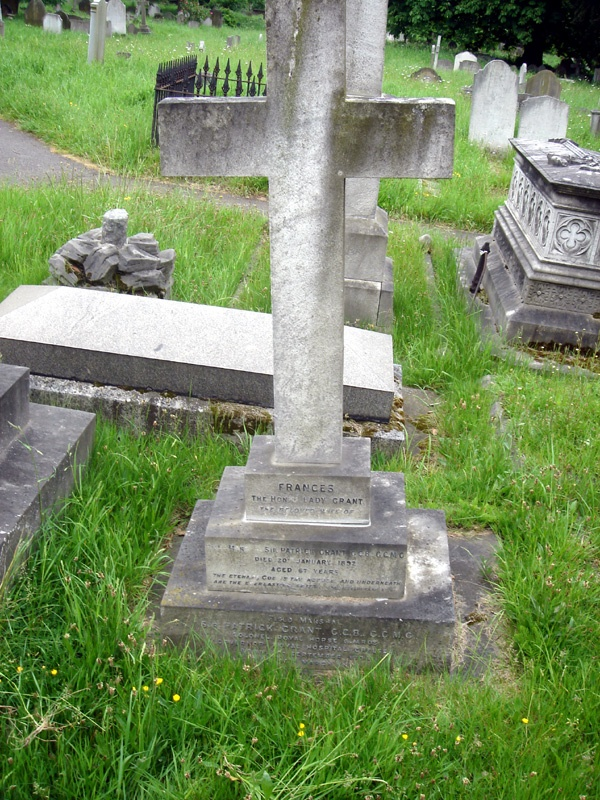
Grant's grave at Brompton Cemetery, London

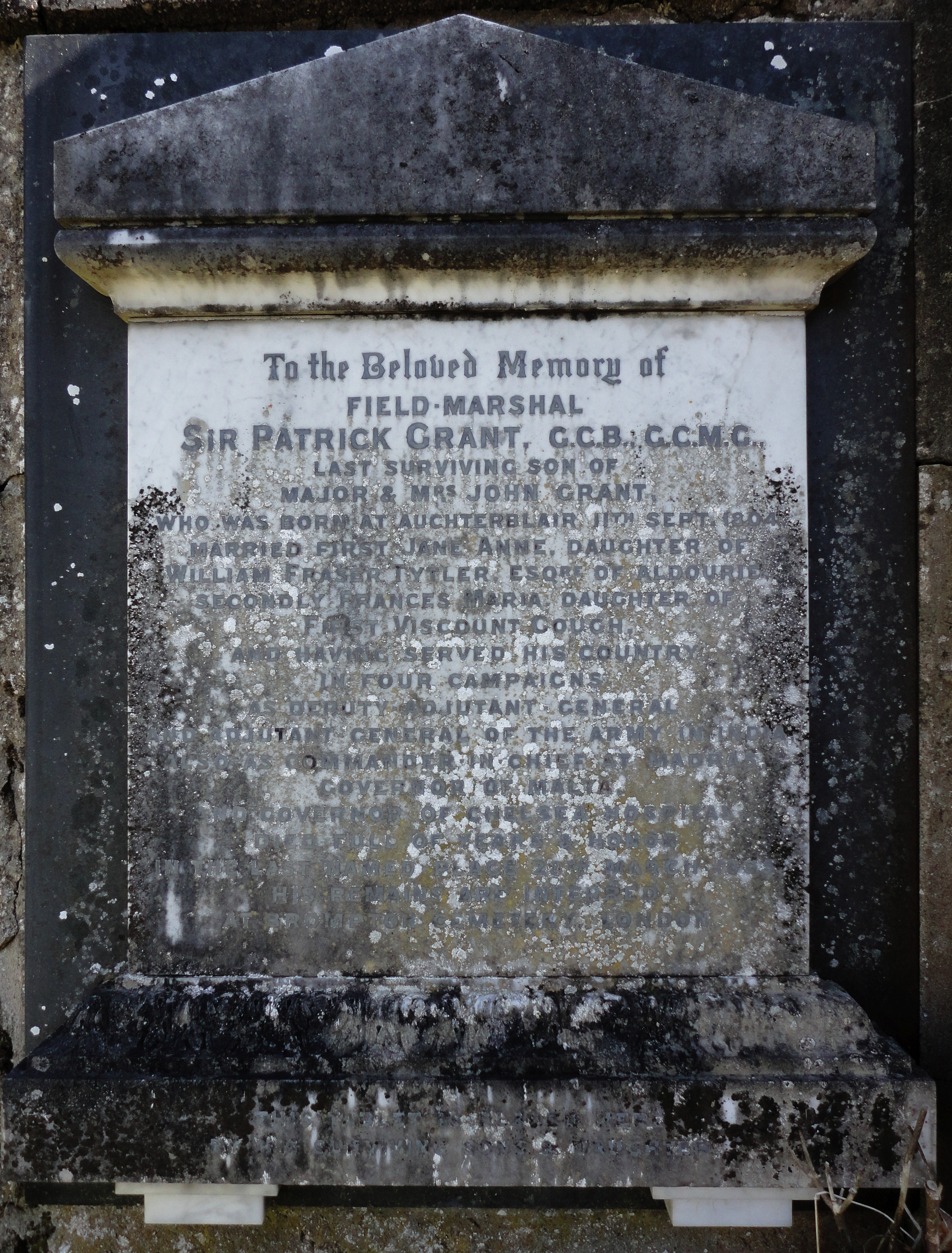
Memorial to Grant at Duthil Old Parish Church and Churchyard

== Honours ==
Grant's honours included:

- Knight Grand Cross of the Order of the Bath (GCB) – 1 March 1861 (KCB – 2 January 1857; CB – 3 April 1846)
- Knight Grand Cross of the Order of St Michael and St George (GCMG) – January 1868

== Family ==
In 1832, Grant married Jane Anne Fraser-Tytler, daughter of William Fraser-Tytler; they had two sons. Following the death of his first wife, he married secondly the Hon. Frances Maria Gough, daughter of Field Marshal Hugh Gough, 1st Viscount Gough, in 1844; they had five children (four sons, including Sir Henry, and a daughter Frances).

His granddaughter Isabel Frances Grant was a notable historian and collector.

== Sources ==
- Heathcote, Tony (1999). The British Field Marshals, 1736–1997: A Biographical Dictionary. Barnsley: Leo Cooper. ISBN 0-85052-696-5.

Military offices
Preceded by George Anson	Commander-in-Chief, Madras Army; 1856–1861	Succeeded by Sir James Grant
Preceded by George Anson	Commander-in-Chief, India; 1856–1857	Succeeded by The Lord Clyde
Preceded by The Lord Strathnairn	Colonel of the Royal Horse Guards; 1885–1895	Succeeded by The Viscount Wolseley
Preceded by New regiment	Colonel of the 2nd Battalion, Seaforth Highlanders; 1881–1885	Succeeded by Sir William Parke
Preceded by Roderick Macneil	Colonel of the 78th (Highlanders) Regiment of Foot; 1863–1881	Succeeded by Regiment amalgamated to form the Seaforth Highlanders
Preceded by New regiment	Colonel of the 104th Regiment of Foot (Bengal Fusiliers); 1862–1863	Succeeded by Sir George Bell
Political offices
Preceded by Sir Henry Storks	Governor of Malta; 1867–1872	Succeeded by Sir Charles van Straubenzee
Honorary titles
Preceded by Sir Sydney Cotton	Governor, Royal Hospital Chelsea; 1874–1895	Succeeded by Sir Donald Stewart
