= Henry Grant (British Army officer) =

British Army officer

General Sir Henry Grant GCB GCVO
- Born: 13 December 1848
- Died: 22 April 1919 (aged 70)
- Relatives: General Sir Patrick Grant (father)
- Military career
- Allegiance: United Kingdom
- Branch: British Army
- Service years: 1868–1909
- Rank: General
- Commands: 5th Infantry Division
- Conflicts: Nile Expedition
- Awards: Knight Grand Cross of the Order of the Bath; Knight Grand Cross of the Royal Victorian Order
- Other work: Governor of Malta (1907–1909)

General Sir Henry Fane Grant, GCB, GCVO (13 December 1848 – 22 April 1919) was a British Army officer who commanded the 5th Division from 1903 to 1906. He was Governor of Malta from 1907 to 1909.

== Military career ==
Born the son of General Sir Patrick Grant, Grant was commissioned into the 4th Queen's Own Hussars in 1868 and took part in the Nile Expedition in 1884. He became Assistant Adjutant-General in Bengal in 1891, Inspector-General of Cavalry in India in 1893, and Inspector of Cavalry in the United Kingdom in 1898.

He went on to be a major general on the staff and was Major General Leslie Rundle's successor as general officer commanding (GOC) of the 5th Division, part of the 2nd Army Corps, on 10 November 1903. He was later governor of Malta in 1907 before he retired from the army in 1909.

In retirement Grant, promoted on 4 September 1912 to general, became lieutenant of the Tower of London. In April 1919, he was killed while out rabbit-shooting in Scotland, and is commemorated by a memorial tablet at Duthil Church near Carrbridge.

Military offices
Preceded by Leslie Rundle	General Officer Commanding 5th Division; 1903–1906	Succeeded by Herbert Plumer
Government offices
Preceded by Sir Charles Clarke	Governor of Malta; 1907–1909	Succeeded by Sir Leslie Rundle
