= John Ogilvie-Grant, 7th Earl of Seafield =

Scottish nobleman

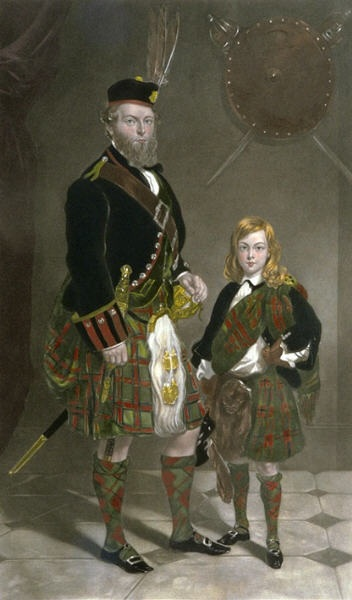
The 7th Earl of Seafield and his son

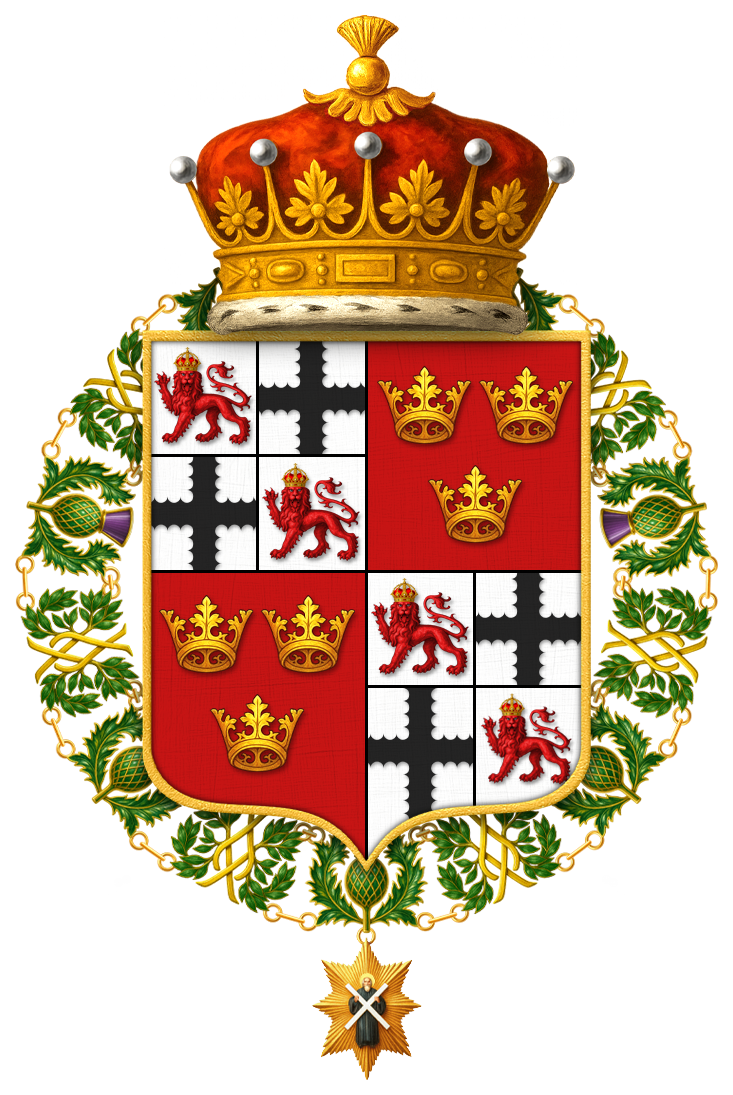
Shield of Arms of John Charles Ogilvie-Grant, 7th Earl of Seafield, KT

John Charles Ogilvie-Grant, 7th Earl of Seafield, KT (4 September 1815 – 18 February 1881), styled Viscount Reidhaven from 1840 to 1853, was a Scottish nobleman. He is numbered as the 26th Chief of Clan Grant.

== Biography ==
=== Early life and family ===
John Charles Grant was born on 4 September 1815, the third son of Francis Ogilvie-Grant, 6th Earl of Seafield, and Mary Ann Dunn, daughter of John Charles Dunn. As a young man, he entered the Royal Navy as a midshipman. His older brothers having predeceased, he succeeded his father as Earl of Seafield in 1853. Lord Seafield married the Hon. Caroline Stuart, daughter of Lord Blantyre, on 12 August 1850. They had one son, Ian Ogilvie-Grant, 8th Earl of Seafield (1851–1884)

=== Political career ===
Unsuccessful in standing for election to the House of Commons in 1841, from 1853 until 1858 Lord Seafield sat in the House of Lords as a Scottish representative peer. The latter year he was created Baron Strathspey, of Strathspey in the Counties of Inverness and Moray, in the Peerage of the United Kingdom. This title gave Seafield an automatic seat in the House of Lords.

He was further honoured by Queen Victoria in 1879 when he was made a Knight of the Thistle.

His friend Sir William Fraser recorded that In Parliament Lord Seafield took no very prominent part, his natural disposition not inclining him to the active turmoil of political life, and the website Historic Hansard shows an appearance but no speeches made in the House of Lords.

Yet he could be described as a red-hot Conservative and one of the chief supporters of his party in the north of Scotland. An ordained elder of the established Church of Scotland, Lord Seafield was nominated by the Prime Minister Lord Derby to represent the monarch as Lord High Commissioner at the General Assembly of the denomination, but he declined the honour.

Fraser recorded that:

When Lord Seafield was not in London attending Parliament, he resided at one or other of the three mansions which he maintained on his extensive estates. Cullen House was the largest of these mansions, and it received from his Lordship a wealth of improvement which gives it quite a palatial splendour and appearance. Castle Grant was his residence in Strathspey, and Balmacaan is the family residence in Glen Urquhart.

Perhaps because of differences of political views or from disputes about family and estate finances, Lord Seafield followed the then legal forms needed to disentail his estates, so that the property might be inherited not necessarily by the nearest male heir but as laid down in a last will and testament. He thus disinherited his brothers, the eldest of whom would otherwise have succeeded on the death of Ian Charles, 8th Earl while unmarried and without children. From this followed a separation, that lasted from 1884 to 1946, between those inheriting the family titles of honour and those in possession of the traditional lands and properties of the Earldom.

=== Proprietary ===
Looking back from 1911, Lord Cassilis summarised Lord Seafield's objective for his estates:

He continued the work of his father in effecting extensive improvements on the estates, both in the way of new houses, steadings, roads, the reclamation of waste land, and in enlarging the extensive plantations the late earl had made.

Particularly noted by his contemporaries was Lord Seafield's development of pine woods of Scotch firs around Grantown and in the parishes of Abernethy and Duthil, extending to some 40,000 acres by 1884. A fir-nursery at Abernethy was said to contain three million young trees. Patron of the Strathspey Farmers Society, Lord Seafield exhibited cattle at the annual Show at Grantown but, it was said, not for prizes, as the tenantry complained that otherwise it was of no use competing. Lord Seafield commissioned the Hon. Thomas Charles Bruce M.P. to oversee a plan to improvement the profitability of the heavily indebted estates he had inherited. Carried into effect 1864–66, the scheme involved redistributing remaining common land between a network of small arable farms whose farm houses and offices would be let with the land; developing upper hill land for game sports; and further professional development of commercial forestry. Together with sponsorship of better communications via the developing railway system and the leasing of house sites in small villages, the scheme resulted in estate income being substantially increased. At the 1883 hearings in Kingussie of the Napier Commission (the Royal Commission of Inquiry into the Condition of Crofters and Cottars in the Highlands and Islands) Bruce represented the Seafield Estates and claimed that It was the express wish of the late Lord Seafield that none of his tenants should be removed in carrying out [the improvements]. Sir William Fraser also stated, in 1884, that:

Lord Seafield, like his father, took a warm interest in the prosperity and happiness of his tenantry ... He did not like changes on his estates.

The Seafield Estates during the 7th Earl's time therefore continued the tradition of not enforcing any major programme of clearance or eviction from their lands, though this was disputed by the Church of Scotland minister of Duthil, the Rev. James Bain.

Both Lord Seafield and his Commissioner, T.C. Bruce, were directors of the Inverness and Perth Junction Railway, a predecessor of The Highland Railway.

=== Clan chiefship ===
During the 1877 visit to Scotland of Ulysses S. Grant, the former president was hosted by Lord Seafield at Castle Grant, and was received as a returning member of Clan Grant.

Lord Seafield took personal interest in sponsoring and attending an annual Highland Games held at Castle Grant. He and his family made a point of attending in full Highland dress.

As illustrative of his love for Highland institutions, down even to the garb of old Gaul, at these gatherings Lord Seafield seldom failed to remind his countrymen how much he disliked their appearance in modern Lowland dress instead of the full Highland costume. His Lordship and the young chief invariably set the Clan an example in that respect.

=== Death and memorial ===
Lord Seafield died in February 1881, aged 65, and was buried next to his father at the Seafield mausoleum at Duthil Old Parish Church and Churchyard, at the centre of the parish of Duthil, Inverness-shire. He was succeeded in his titles by his son Ian Charles Ogilvie-Grant. The Dowager Countess of Seafield died in 1911.

His funeral, culminating at the Seafield Mausoleum in Duthil Churchyard, was accompanied by pipers: a sorrowing clan mourning for their lost chief.

As Laird o' Grant, Chief of the Clan, Grandly himself bore he - A leal true-hearted Highlandman of noblest ancestry.

Lord Strathspey suggested in 1983 that with the death of the 7th Earl of Seafield the era when the Laird's ruling hand had been ready to help and guide his family and clan came to an end. The more impartial Sir Robert Bruce Lockhart, however, wrote that Lord Seafield's widow, the Countess Dowager was The last of the great feudal chiefs.

Peerage of Scotland
Preceded by Francis William Ogilvie-Grant	Earl of Seafield; 1853–1881	Succeeded by Ian Charles Ogilvie-Grant
Peerage of the United Kingdom
New creation	Baron Strathspey; 1858–1881	Succeeded by Ian Charles Ogilvy-Grant
