= Duthil Old Parish Church and Churchyard =

Church in Inverness-shire, Scotland

Coordinates: 57°17′49″N 3°46′06″W

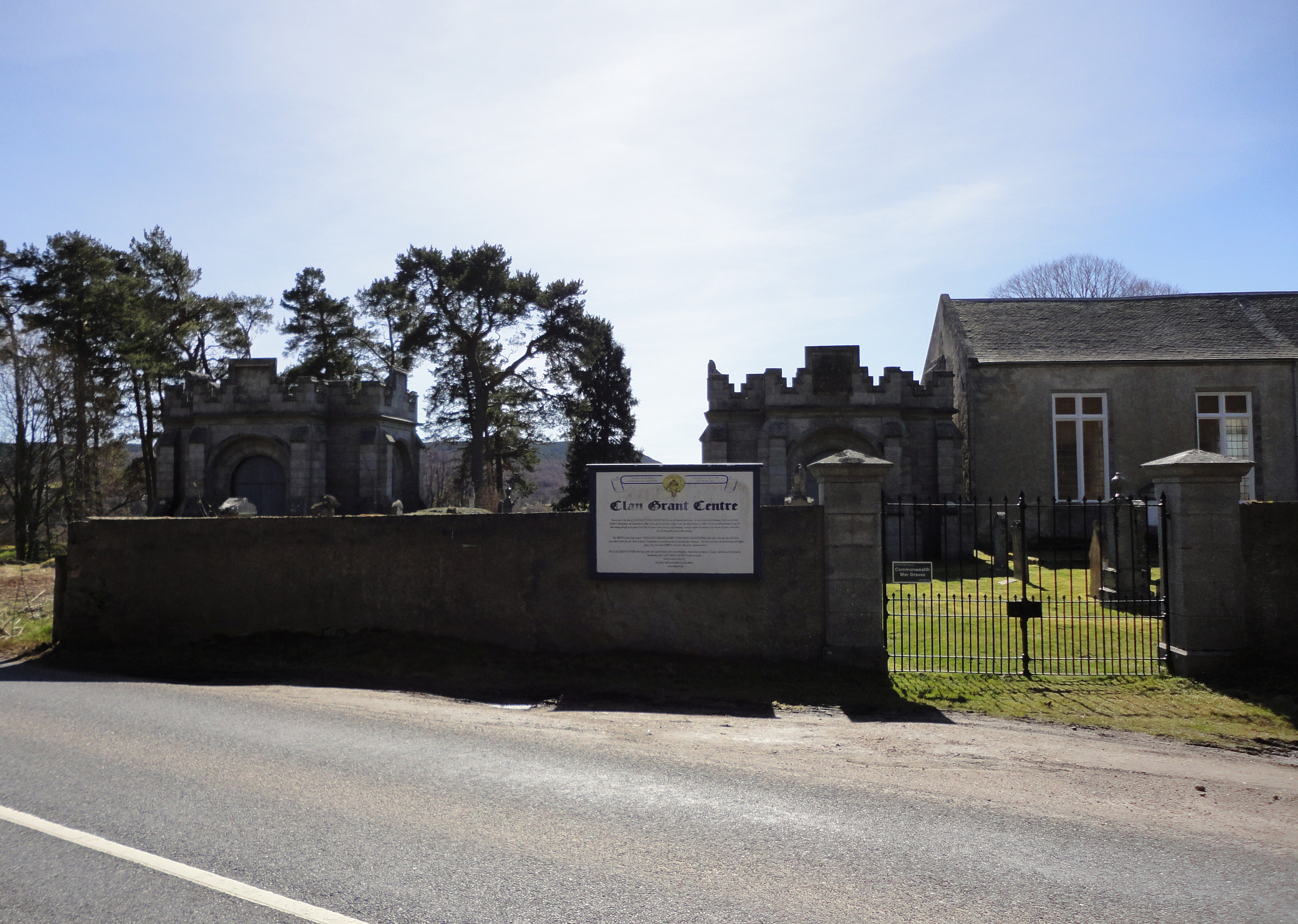
Duthil Old Parish Church and Churchyard with two mausolea

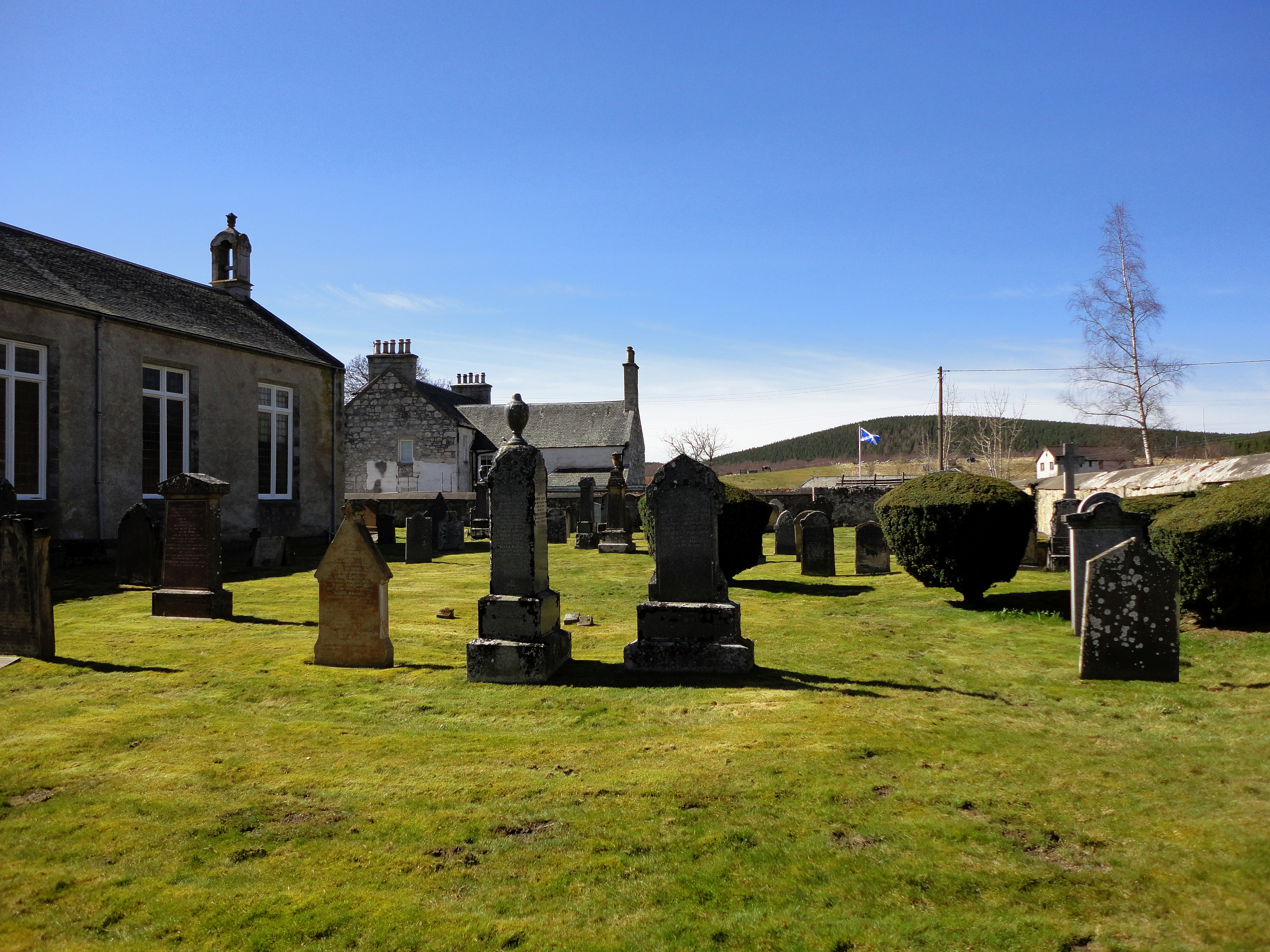
Duthil Old Parish Church and Churchyard

Duthil Old Parish Church and Churchyard is a historic site at the centre of the historical parish of Duthil (Scottish Gaelic: Daothal), near Carrbridge, Inverness-shire. It is presently maintained as a Clan Grant heritage centre.

== Old Parish Church ==
The first recorded church at Duthil, dedicated to St Peter, was built about 1400, probably on the site of an earlier building. The church has been rebuilt on several occasions. The New Statistical Account reports the pre-Reformation building was 'taken down in 1826' and a new, 'excellent edifice' built the same year. Plans held by the National Records of Scotland show the 19th century interior was focussed on a raised pulpit on the long south wall. Three galleries, off both the east and west walls, and off the north wall, sloped down towards the pulpit, and the ground floor seating was also arranged facing the pulpit and to each side. At the same time the Seafield burial vault under the previous church was replaced by the self-standing first Mausoleum. The church was again renovated just before World War I by the Glasgow architect Peter MacGregor Chalmers, when the intention was to provide space for an organ and choir. Old Duthil Church closed for services in 1967.

When Old Duthil Church was closed and sold, its pulpit, communion table and chair were removed and reinstalled in the former Carrbridge United Free Church, still (2017) used for worship by the Church of Scotland congregation. Additionally, a number of memorial plaques were removed from the walls and rehung in the vestry of the Carrbridge Church, where they remain: these include one to Field Marshal Sir Patrick Grant.

== Churchyard ==
The churchyard, which surrounds the Old Parish Church, includes many memorials to members of Clan Grant. There is a memorial tablet to Field Marshal Sir Patrick Grant, GCB GCMG (1804–1895), who is buried in Brompton Cemetery, London.

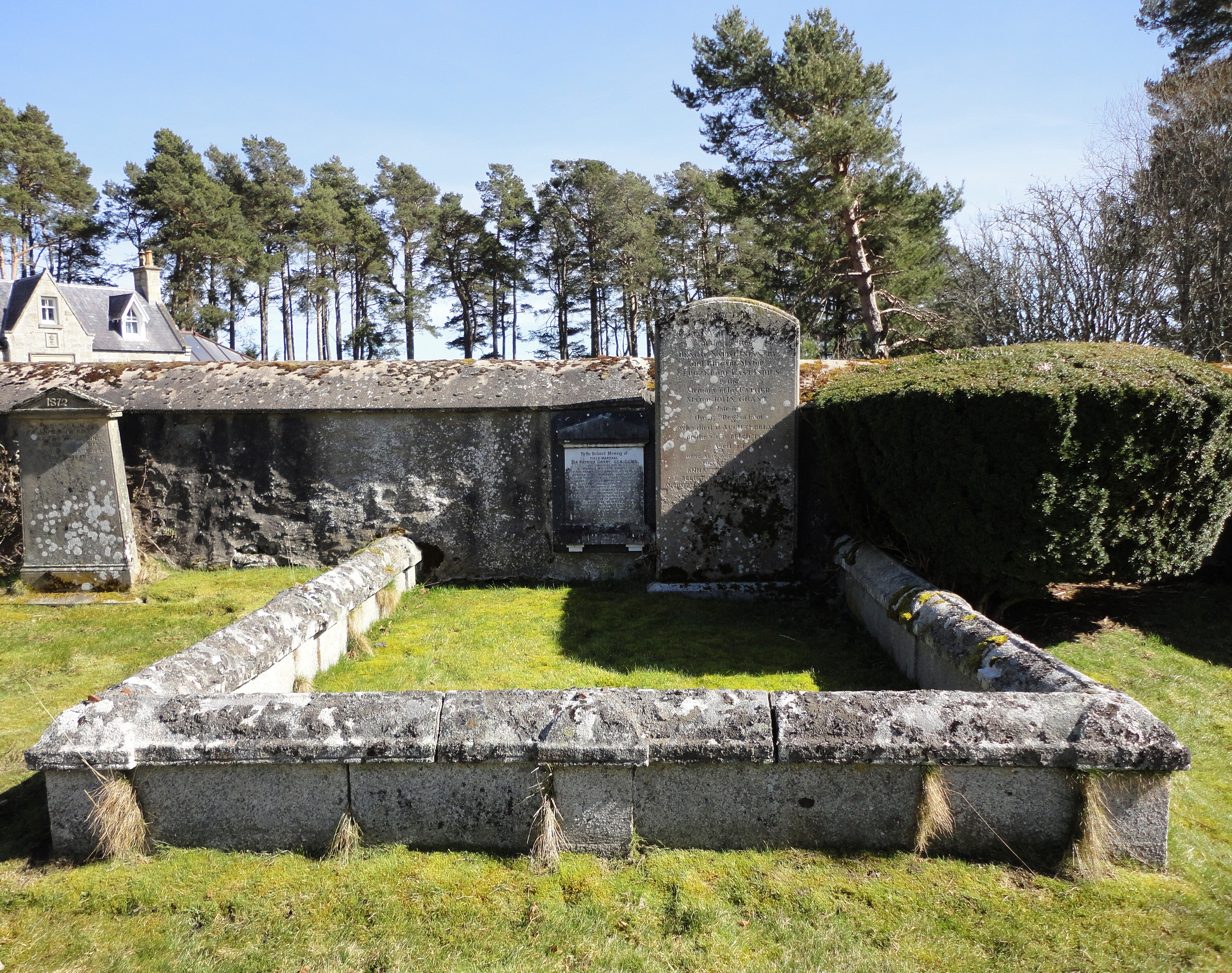
Grave of the family of Field Marshal Sir Patrick Grant

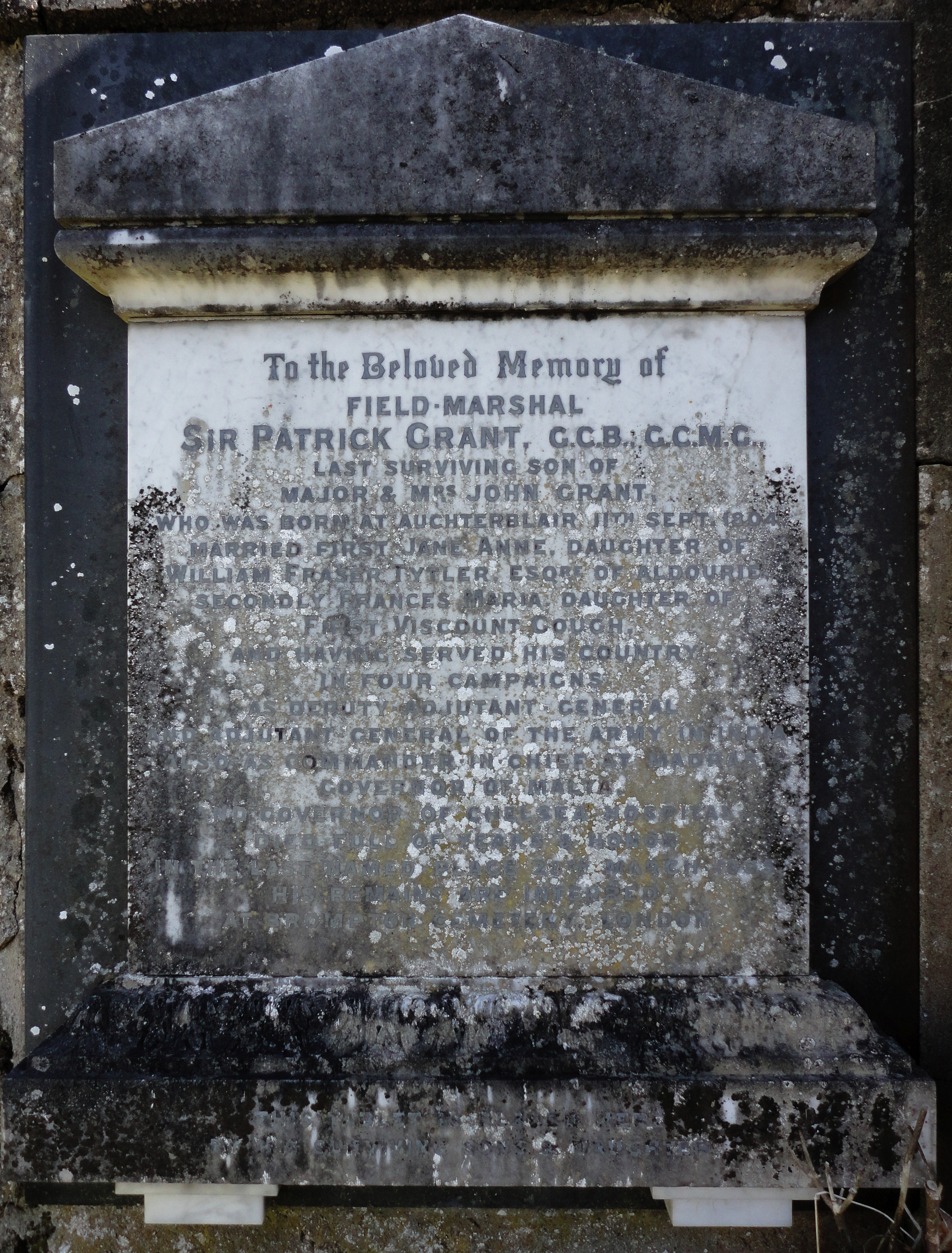
Memorial to Field Marshal Sir Patrick Grant

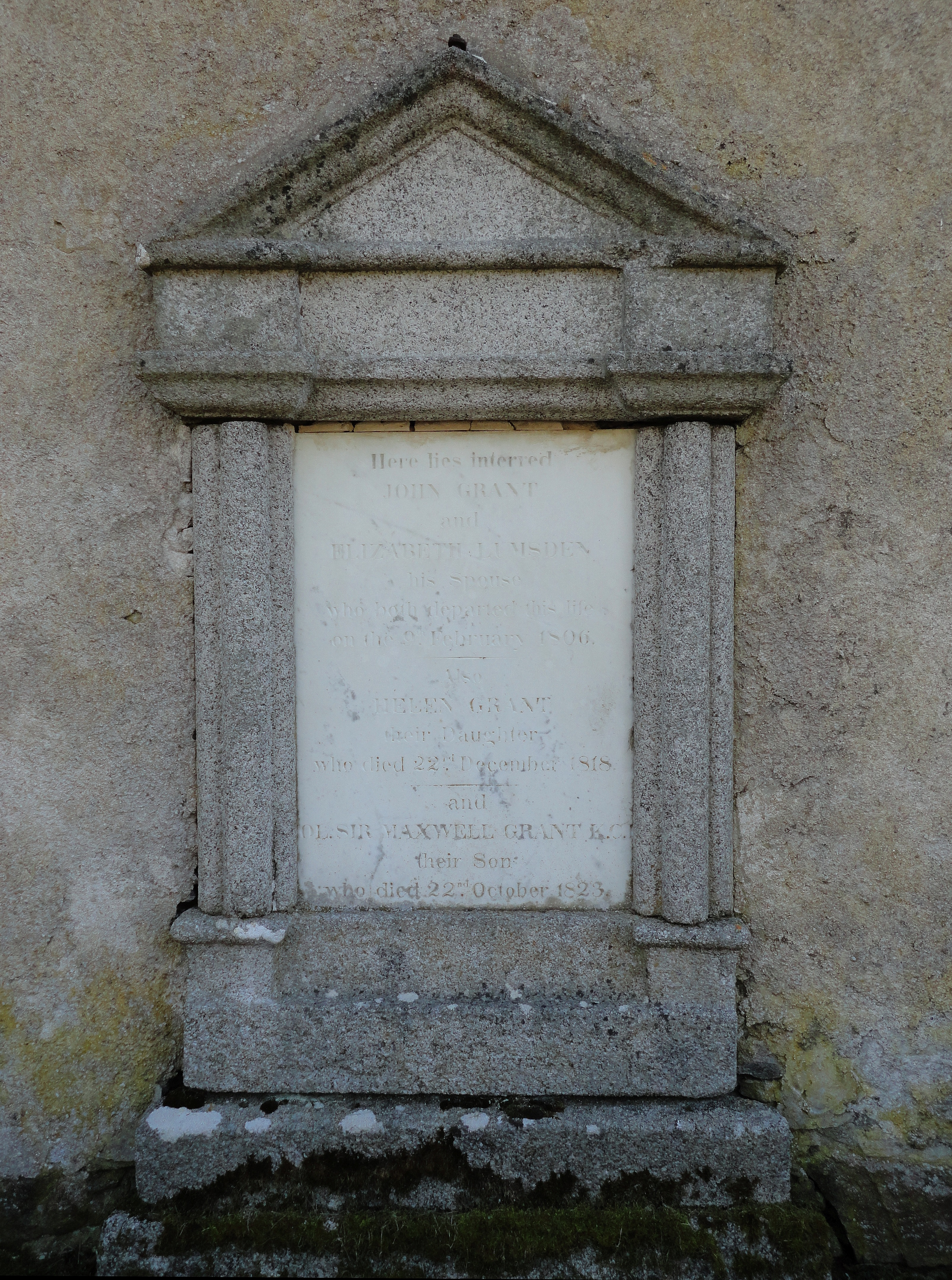
Grave of the family of Colonel Sir Maxwell Grant (died 1823)

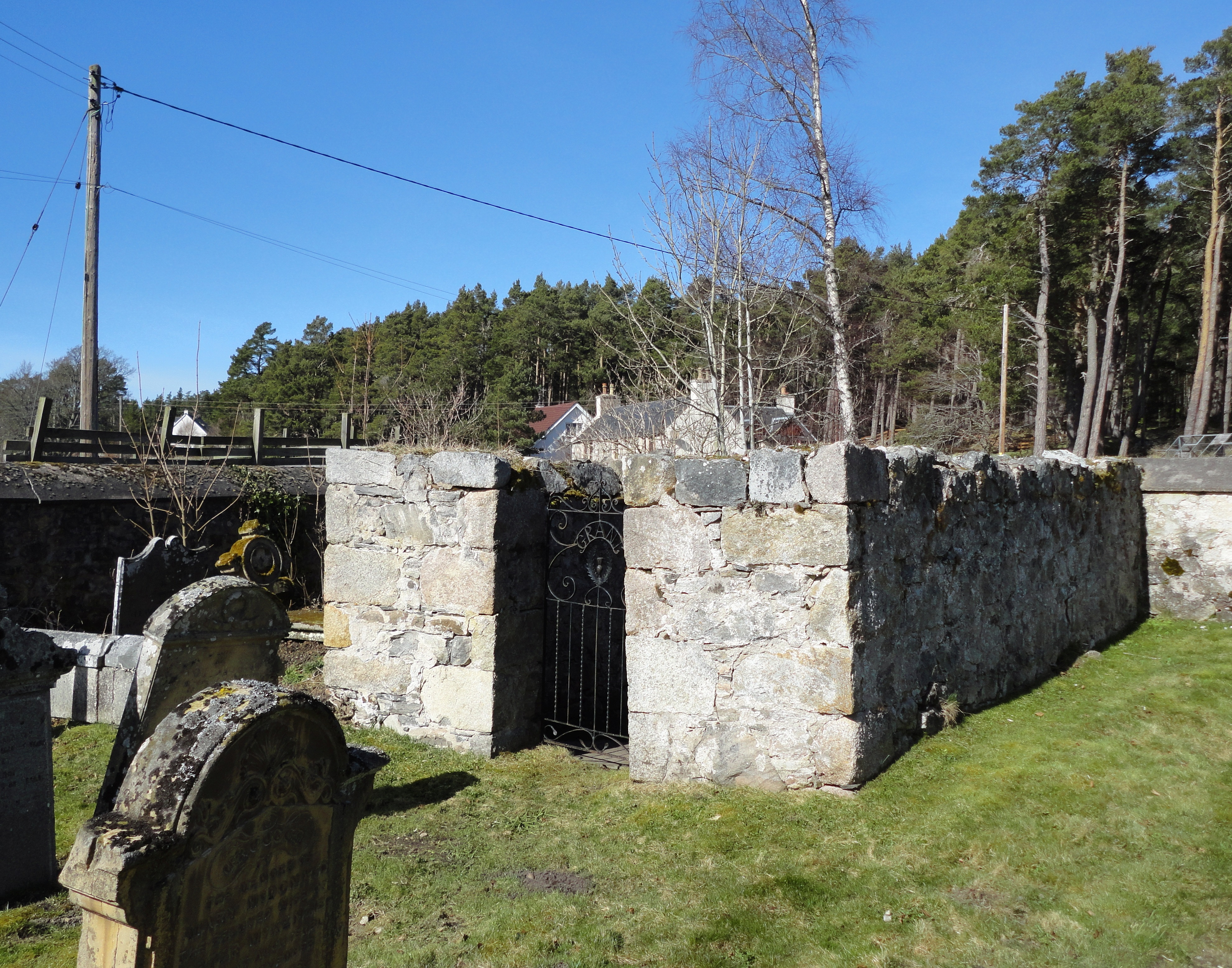
Walled Grant tomb

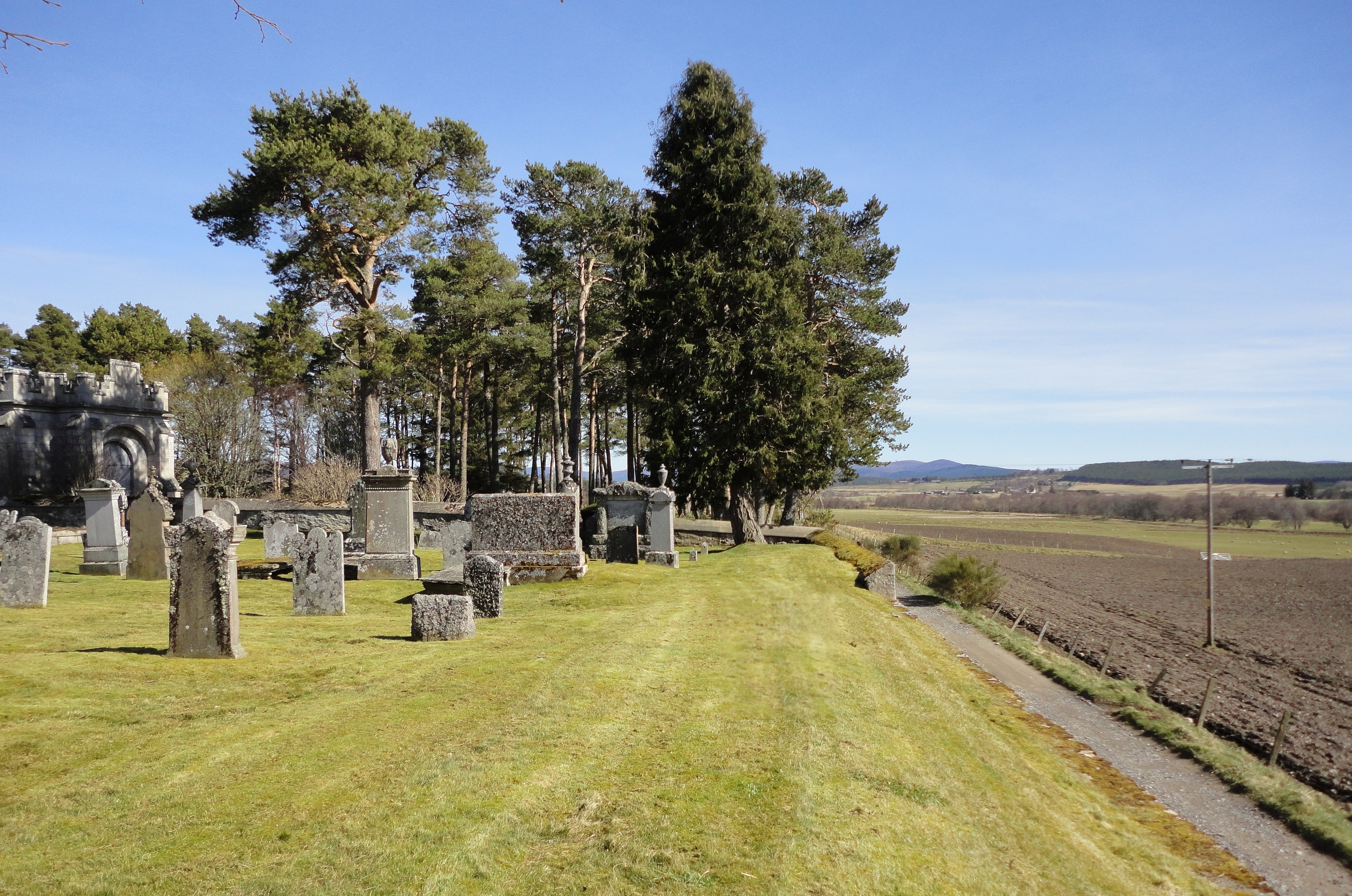
View from the churchyard

== Grant Mausolea ==
There are two mausolea for the Grant of Grant family, one immediately adjacent to the Old Parish Church in the east, and another further to the east just outside the walled churchyard. The first of these mausolea was built in 1837-9. The mausoleum adjacent to the church serves as resting place of the Earls of Seafield. Members of the family who were buried here until the mausoleum was sealed up in 1913 include:

- Ludovick Alexander Ogilvy-Grant, 5th Earl of Seafield (1767–1840)
- Francis William Ogilvy-Grant, 6th Earl of Seafield (1778–1853)
- John Charles Ogilvy-Grant, 7th Earl of Seafield (1815–1881)
- Ian Charles Ogilvy-Grant, 8th Earl of Seafield (1851–1884)
- Caroline Stuart, Countess Dowager of Seafield (1830–1911)

The Grants of Castle Grant have had their burial place at Duthil since the late 16th century. The first Chief to be interred here was James Grant, 3rd of Freuchie, whose last will and testament, dated 1553, ordered that he be buried in the parish church of Duthil. His grandson John Grant of Freuchie interred here in 1585.

The first use of the Seafield Mausoleum was for the joint funeral of Mary Anne Dunn, wife of Francis William, the 6th Earl of Seafield, and of their son, Francis William Ogilvy-Grant M.P., the Master of Grant. An account of the ceremony was first published in ‘The Inverness Courier’, 1 April 1840:

The scene was one which will be indelibly engraved on the memories of those who witnessed it, and will form the subject of a tale, that will be told with feelings of deep interest, by sire to son, for generations yet to come. Over a wide tract of country, extending to many miles, and comprehending several parishes, all operations were suspended; and a mournful gloom, like a heavy cloud, hung over the district. Groups of people, of all ages, decently attired, were seen in different directions, wending their way towards the line of procession: while the tolling, at intervals, of the bells of the churches and public seminaries [schools], rendered the event more striking and impressive. At two o'clock the procession emerged from the policies of Castle Grant - the people on foot, assembled at this point, being in advance of the funeral, in marching order. The remains of the beloved lady, the hearse and horses decked out with black plumes, the driver, etc, wearing black crepes and weepers, followed the pedestrians; and the remains of the Master, the hearse and horses decked with white plumes, and the servants wearing scarves of white crepe, immediately followed the remains of his mother. While the immediate relations, followed by the factor and gentlemen in the employment of the family, the clergymen, gentlemen, and principal tenantry connected with the estate in a line of vehicles, formed a procession extending, at some points, to about a mile in length. The effect produced on the feelings of the community who beheld this procession may be more easily conceived than described. From the chief mourner to the humblest of his dependents, a mystic chord of affection, formed by acts of benevolence on the part of the family, and feelings of gratitude on the part of the clan, like an electric chain, touched and affected all, in a greater or less degree, along the line of procession. … After the tenantry assembled on the spot were permitted to take the last look of the remains, the gates of the splendid Mausoleum (finished only last year) were closed on the mother and son, there to repose “in the sure and certain hope of a joyful resurrection”.'

The last use of the original Seafield Mausoleum was on 12 October 1911 for the funeral of Lady Caroline Stuart, Countess Dowager of Seafield, then the proprietor of the Seafield Estates. She was the widow of John Charles, 7th Earl and mother and heir of Ian Charles, 8th Earl. Having earlier had the second Mausoleum built, by her will Lady Seafield closed the first. A plaque bolted across its door reads: "In terms of the Testamentary Writings of Caroline Stuart, Countess Dowager of Seafield, this Mausoleum has been closed and is not to be used for further interments. February 1913." A tribute volume to Lady Seafield, published 1911, contained an account of proceedings at the Mausoleum at the end of her funeral.

The procession moved slowly into the churchyard, and when the dirge of the pipes had died away, there was heard the voice of the noble clergyman reciting the solemn committal service - “I am the Resurrection and the Life.” The pallbearers followed the coffin into the darkened interior, from which the voice of the officiating clergyman came to the throng outside. When the obsequies were over, once more there was heard over the calm and peaceful scene the tender, expressive music of the Highlanders. The piper of The Mackintosh of Mackintosh, Mr Duncan Macdonald, at the bidding of his chief, played as few could so well that fine setting - “The Lament for the Only Son”. It came as the climax and the end to a series of ceremonies that will have an abiding place in the memory of all who witnessed them. There are two mausoleums in the churchyard which have been the burying place of the family. In the one that was opened on Thursday was placed the body of the seventh Earl of Seafield, husband of the Countess, who died in 1881. Here also were brought the remains of their only son, Ian Charles, who died in 1884. The last vacant niche will be filled by the coffin of the late Countess. In the mausoleum on Thursday the coffins of husband and son were to be seen, lying side by side. That of the Countess, now rejoining in the silence of the tomb those whose early deaths threw a shadow over the greater portion of her life, was placed temporarily at right angles to the others. The latter were still covered with wreaths, the Countess, up to a comparatively recent date, having regularly visited the mausoleum. The three coffins will now be placed together in a common recess, and the mausoleum will then be permanently closed. After the chief mourners had left the mausoleum, after the office for the death had been fully recited, when all had been done for the honoured dead that devoted mourners could do, an opportunity was given to the company of filing past the coffin and of seeing where three members of the great family are sleeping their last long sleep.

The Rev. James Bain, minister of the Church of Scotland parish of Duthil 1877-1911 sought to prevent the building of the second Mausoleum, claiming the first was insanitary as the coffins it held were stored above ground, unburied. After considerable controversy, his claims were shown to be wholly unfounded. His pamphlet, 'The Seafield Mausoleums and Duthil Churchyard case. A specimen of how officials tamper with the law in Scotland when they want to serve the great. Correspondence between J. Bain, Henry D. Littlejohn and Sir William Harcourt,' (Elgin, 1885) contained his objections.

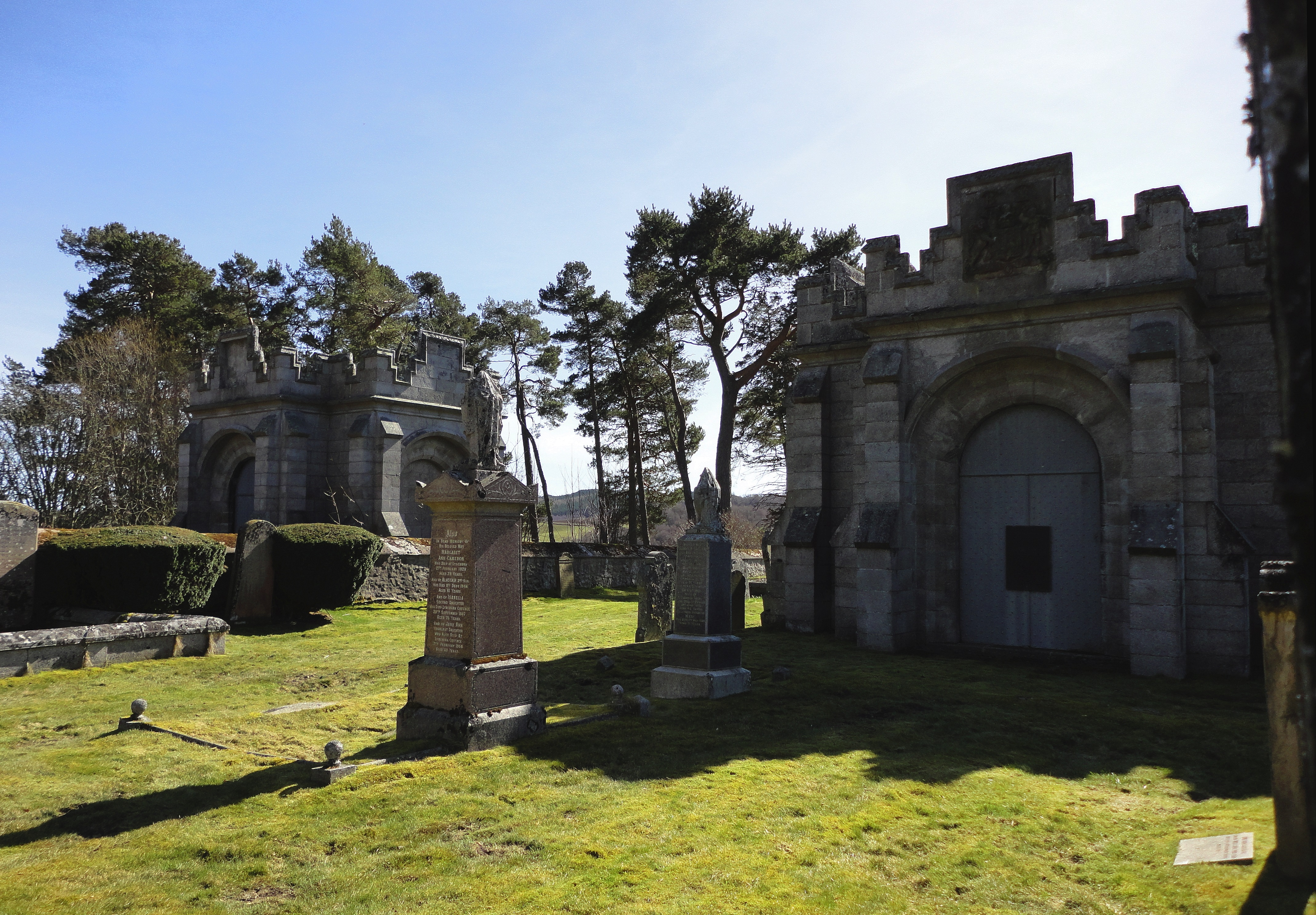
Mausoleum adjacent to the church (right) and second Mausoleum outside the churchyard (left)

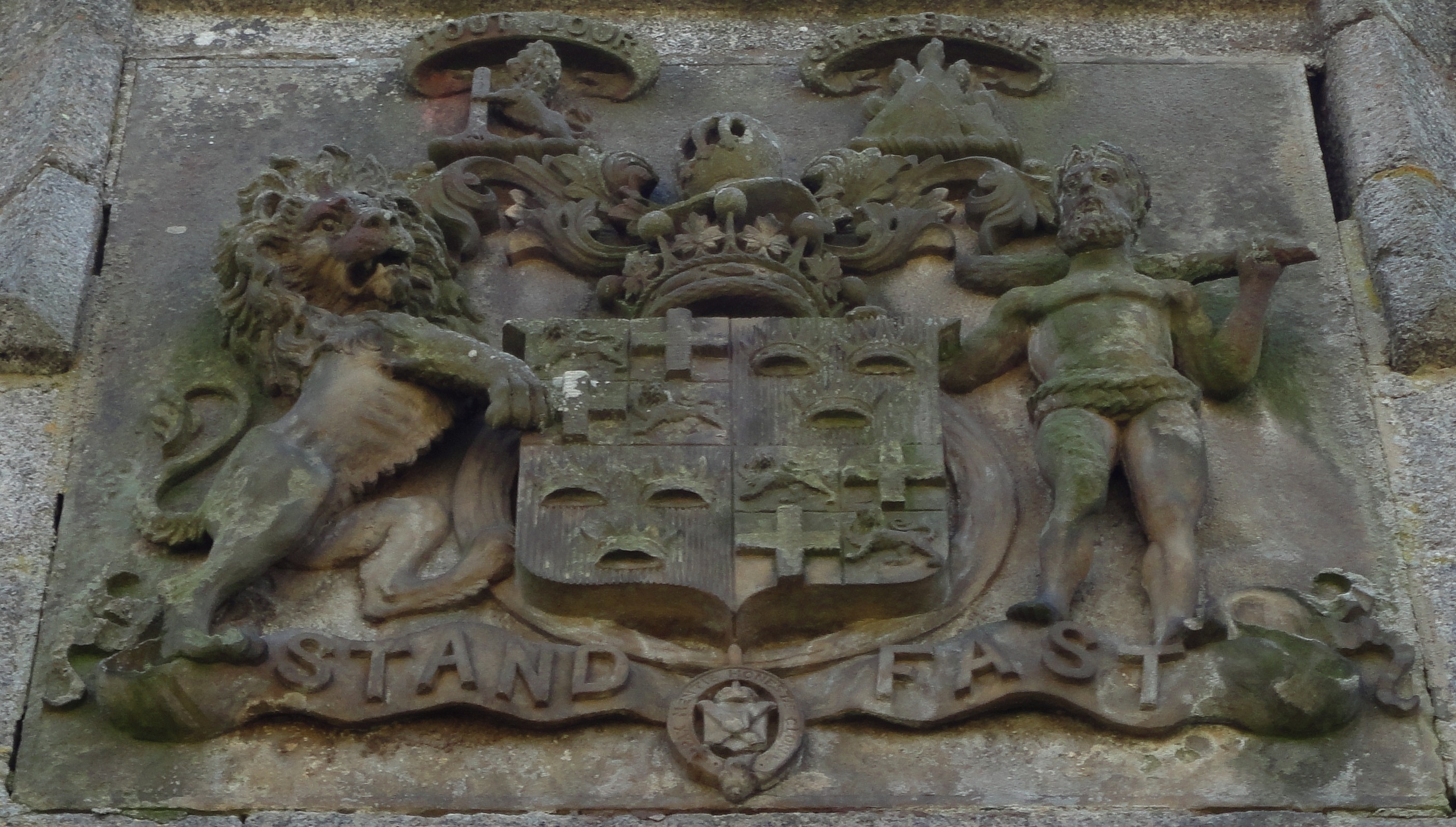
Mausoleum adjacent to the church - Seafield arms

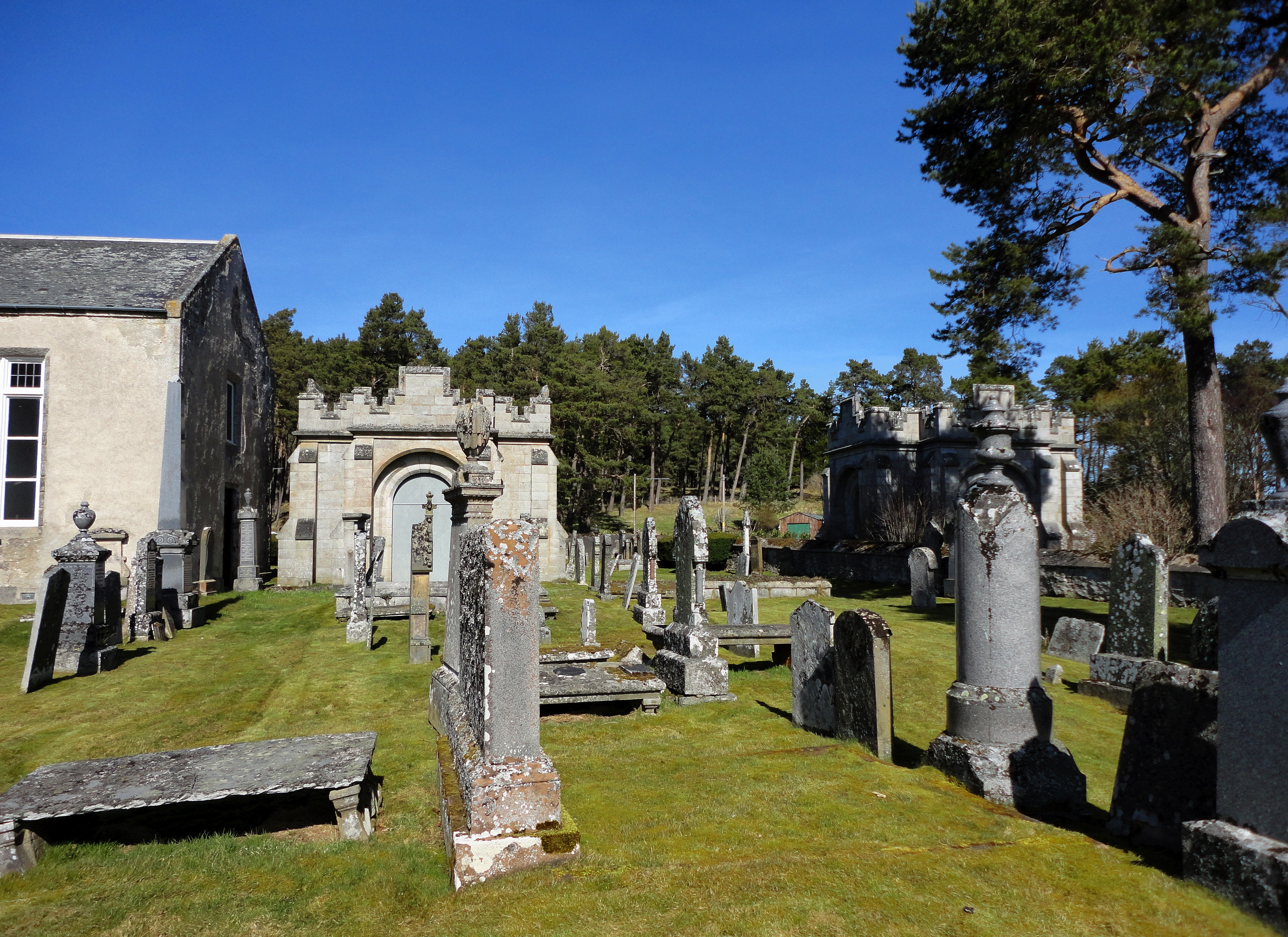
Churchyard and mausolea adjacent to the church (left) and outside the churchyard (right)

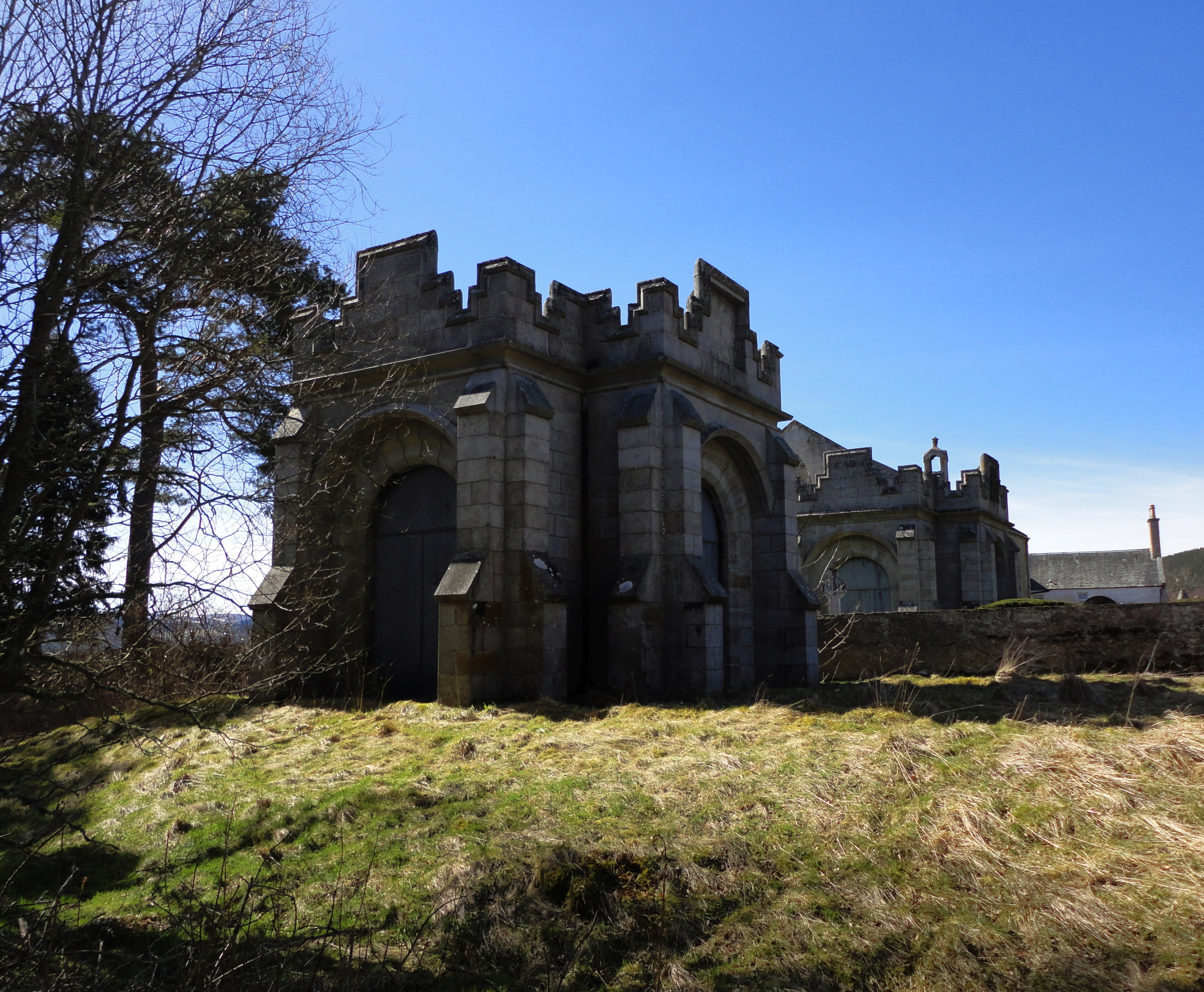
Mausolea outside the churchyard (left) and adjacent to the church (right)

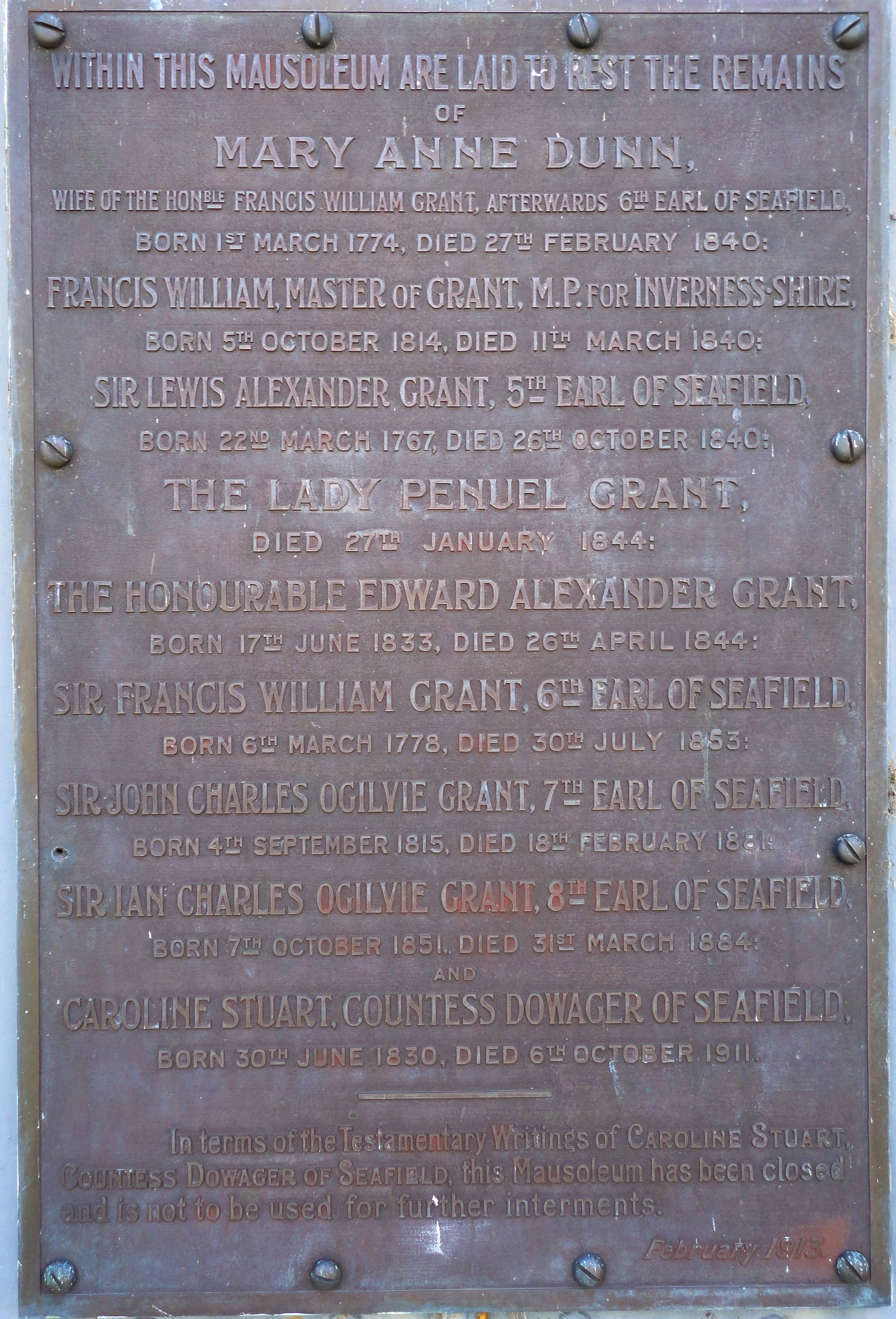
Tablet listing those interred in the Mausoleum
