= Ian Charles Community Hospital =

- NHS Highland
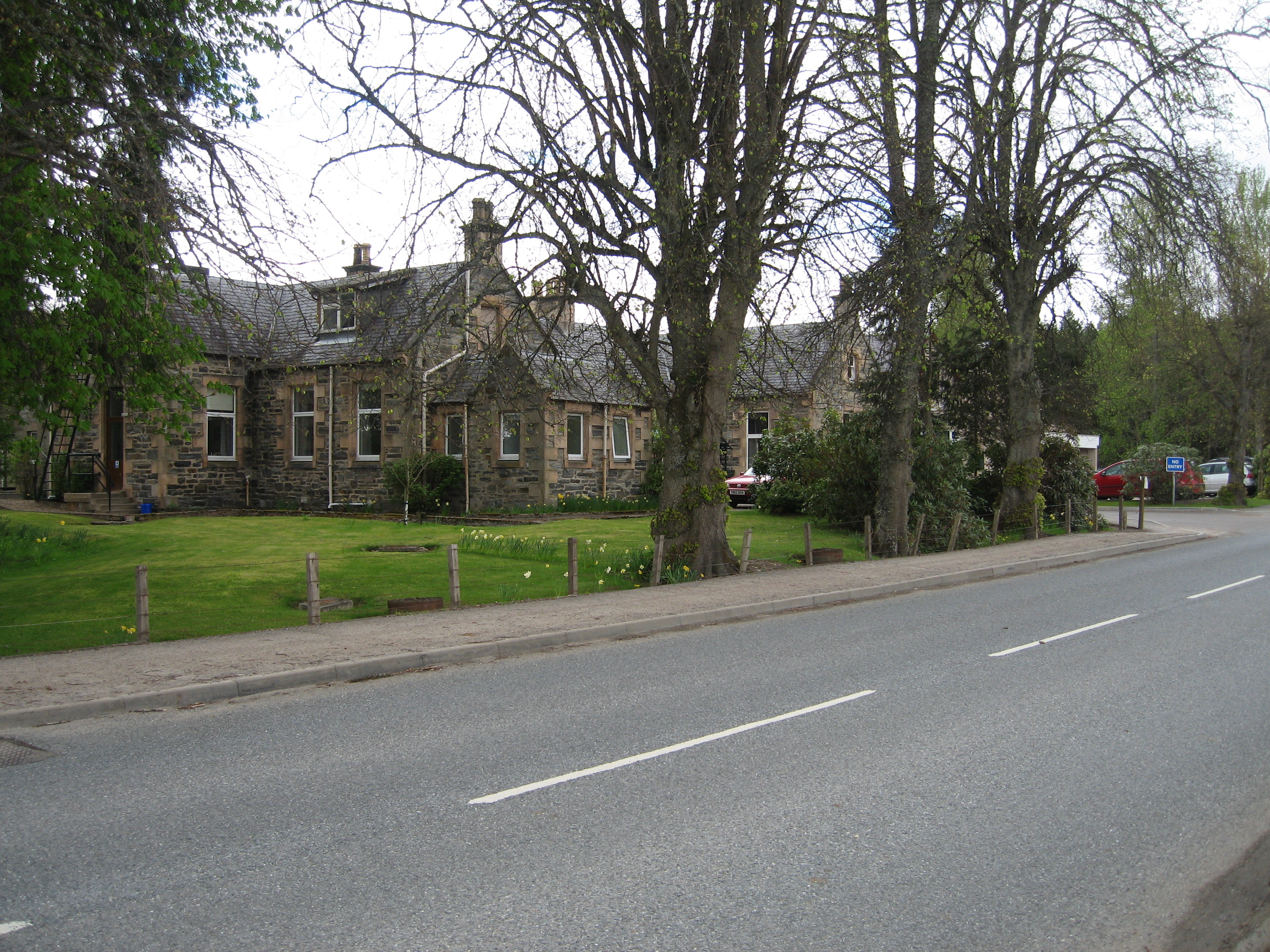
- Ian Charles Community Hospital

- Location within Badenoch and Strathspey

Geography
- Location: Castle Road East, Grantown-on-Spey, Scotland
- Coordinates: 57.3369°N 3.6043°W

Organisation
- Care system: NHS Scotland
- Type: General

Services
- Emergency department: No

History
- Founded: 1885

Links
- Lists: Hospitals in Scotland

Ian Charles Community Hospital is a health facility in Castle Road East, Grantown-on-Spey, Scotland. It is managed by NHS Highland.

== History ==
The facility, which was founded by the Countess of Seafield in memory of her son, Ian Charles Ogilvy-Grant, opened in 1885. A maternity wing was completed in 1923, and, after joining the National Health Service in 1948, it was further expanded in the 1950s. In February 2015, it was announced that the hospital would close once a new health centre in Aviemore had been completed.
