= Caroline Stuart, Countess of Seafield =

Scottish noblewoman (1830–1911)

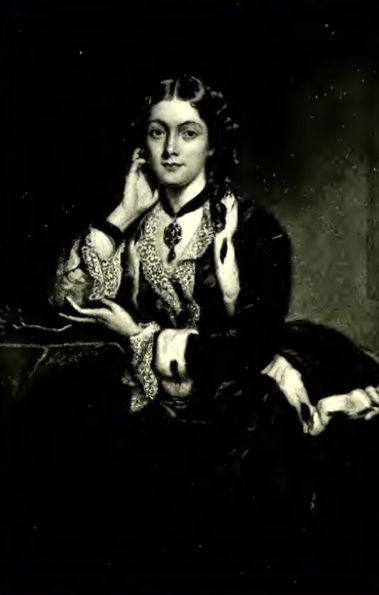
The Rt. Hon. Caroline, Countess of Seafield

Caroline Stuart, Countess of Seafield (30 June 1830 – 6 October 1911), styled as the Countess Dowager from 1884 to 1911, was a member of the Scottish aristocracy. She was suo jure proprietor of the Seafield estates following the death of her son in 1884, and thus was de facto Chieftainess of Clan Grant. She has been described as the "last of the great feudal chiefs."

== Biography ==
=== Early life ===
The Honourable Caroline Stuart was the youngest surviving child of Maj.-Gen. Robert Walter Stuart, 11th Lord Blantyre and his wife Frances Mary Rodney, a granddaughter of Admiral Lord Rodney. Her family was descended from the Stewarts of Minto, a branch of the Stewarts of Galloway, who were ennobled by James VI in 1606 (for further history, see Lord Blantyre). Caroline's father was killed several months after she was born; her twin brother, Henry, died in 1842, aged 12. The future Countess' life was to be fraught with tragedy.

=== Marriage to Lord Reidhaven ===
On 12 August 1850, aged 20, Caroline married John Charles Ogilvy-Grant, Viscount Reidhaven, Master of Grant, who was heir to the Seafield estates. Their only child, Ian Charles was born on 7 October 1851. On 30 July 1853, John succeeded his father as Earl of Seafield and Chief of the Clan Grant. Her husband and son were to die within a few years of each other: John on 18 February 1881 and Ian on 31 March 1884.

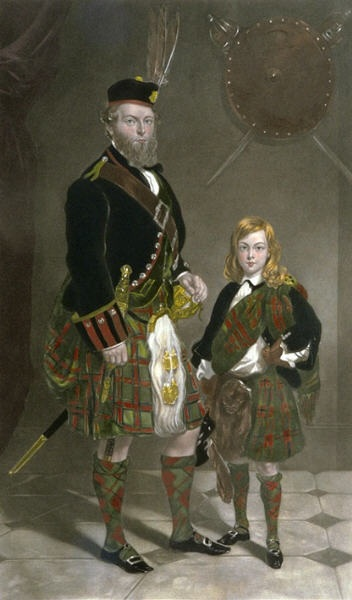
John and Ian Ogilvy-Grant.

=== Countess of Seafield ===
In the section 'Public and Social Work' in the tribute volume published after her death, the editors highlighted Lady Seafield's support for her husband's management of his estates. They mentioned her interest in his patronage of individuals through appointments in the established church and educational bursaries, his program of afforestation, and "in general improvements effected throughout the estate, his lordship had always the affectionate advice and warm interest of the Countess." Primarily, she was a social hostess.

The Earl and Countess usually spent a portion of every spring in London, while the rest of the year was passed between Cullen House, Castle Grant, and Balmacaan in Glen Urquhart. They had a special affection for Balmacaan, the place where they had spent the early years of their married life, and every return brought them renewed pleasure. At each of their residences, they entertained select parties of guests, and nowhere did the Countess of Seafield more winningly display her gracious gifts of manner than as the bright, polished, and vivacious hostess of guests under the roof-tree of the Chieftain of the Clan Grant.

=== Countess Dowager of Seafield ===
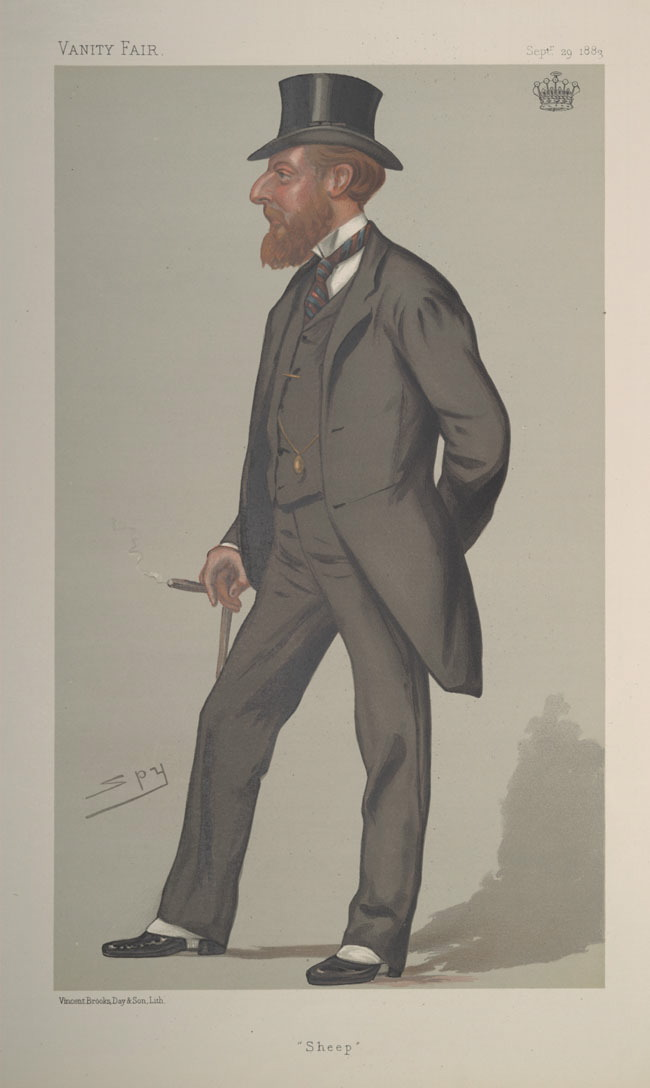
Ian Charles Ogilvy-Grant, 9th Earl of Seafield

As Lord Seafield was unmarried and had no children, by a will made c. 1882 Ian left his mother as the heir to his estates. Taking the style of Countess Dowager, Lady Seafield was proprietor of the Seafield and Grant Estates until her death. Meanwhile her son's titles of honour were inherited by his uncle, James Ogilvy-Grant, who was otherwise the nearest male heir. The Seafield title was thus for some generations separated from the lands and properties that had maintained it. This situation had been made possible because the 7th Earl, John, had completed the legal procedure of disentailing the estate.

After the deaths of her husband and son, Lady Seafield's priorities as Countess Dowager, besides overseeing the management of her estates, were to 'take steps for the perpetuation of (her son's) memory and that of her husband in schemes of enduring utility'. The first of these was a public hospital for Strathspey, named the Ian Charles Hospital in his memory:

Thus, fifteen months after his death, in May 1885 there was opened at Grantown-on-Spey the Ian Charles Hospital. The erection and endowment of such a hospital had been arranged by the Countess Dowager and her son. It had been little more than founded when the Earl died, and his sorrowing mother brought the undertaking to a completion. All who know the capital of Strathspey know the place well.... The hospital was and is fitted with all necessary conveniences and comforts for the treatment and care of the sick, and has been of untold benefit to the Speyside district of the Seafield estates.

In addition the Dowager Countess had the Church of Scotland parish church of Inverallan, located in Grantown-on-Spey, rebuilt by her architect: she laid the memorial stone on 1 May 1886 on the occasion of the dedication of the building for worship. Memorial tablets to her husband and son were presented to this and all the other parishes churches within the estate.

=== Death and funeral ===
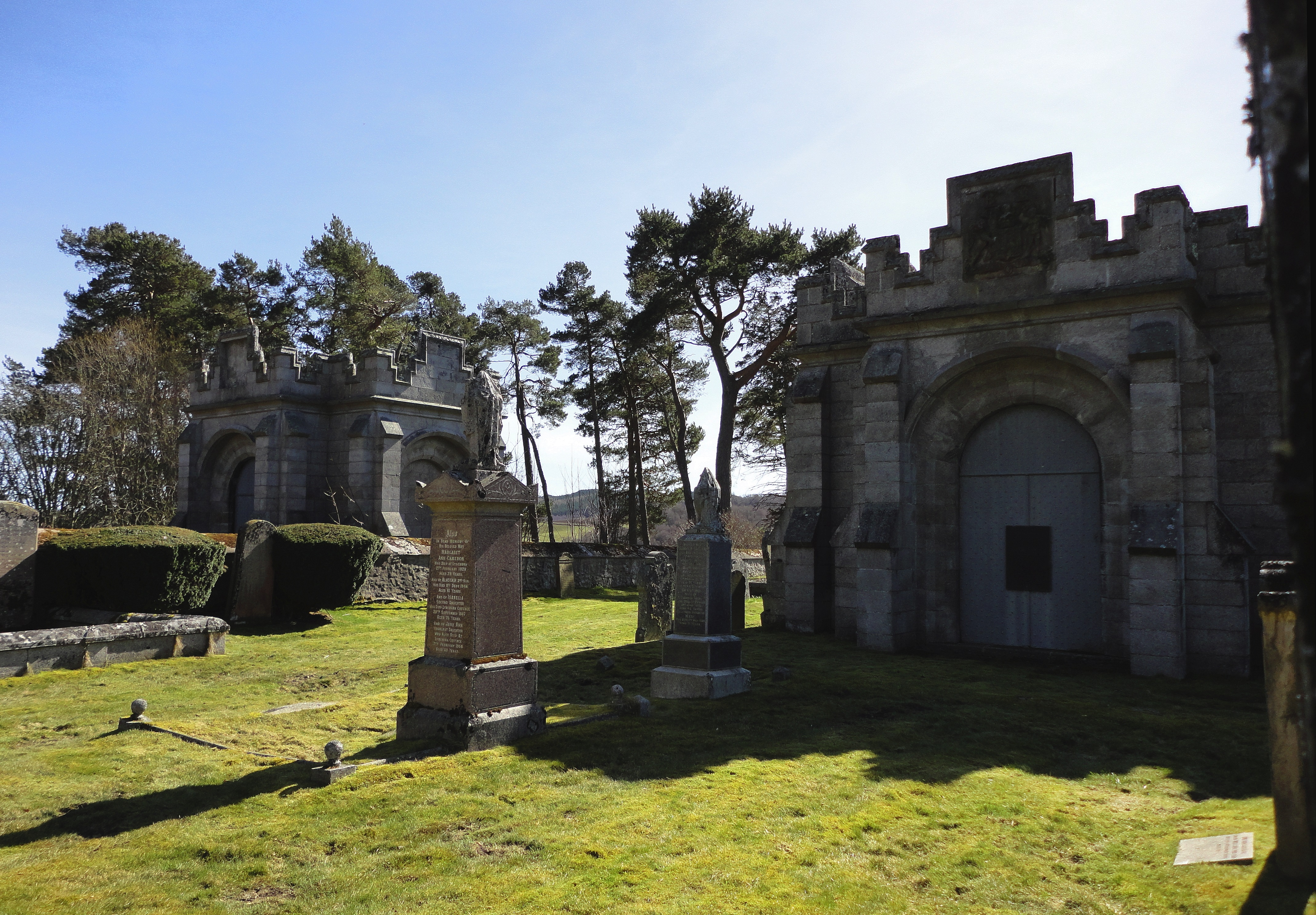
The Seafield Mausoleum at Duthil Old Parish Church

Lady Seafield died on 6 October 1911. Her funeral was held on 12 October. Her coffin rests, with those of her husband and son, in the Seafield Mausoleum in the Duthil Old Parish Church and Churchyard, which was built by the 6th Earl of Seafield in the 1830s. The funeral of the Rt. Hon. Caroline, Countess Dowager of Seafield was held on 12 October 1911. This was the last use of the original Seafield Mausoleum. Having earlier had the second Mausoleum built, by her will Lady Seafield closed the first. A plaque bolted across its door reads: "In terms of the Testamentary Writings of Caroline Stuart, Countess Dowager of Seafield, this Mausoleum has been closed and is not to be used for further interments. February 1913." The Tribute volume of 1911 contained an account of proceedings at the Mausoleum at the end of her funeral:

The procession moved slowly into the churchyard, and when the dirge of the pipes had died away, there was heard the voice of the noble clergyman reciting the solemn committal service – “I am the Resurrection and the Life.” The pallbearers followed the coffin into the darkened interior, from which the voice of the officiating clergyman came to the throng outside. When the obsequies were over, once more there was heard over the calm and peaceful scene the tender, expressive music of the Highlanders. The piper of The Mackintosh of Mackintosh, Mr Duncan Macdonald, at the bidding of his chief, played as few could so well that fine setting – “The Lament for the Only Son”. It came as the climax and the end to a series of ceremonies that will have an abiding place in the memory of all who witnessed them. There are two mausoleums in the churchyard which have been the burying place of the family. In the one that was opened on Thursday was placed the body of the seventh Earl of Seafield, husband of the Countess, who died in 1881. Here also were brought the remains of their only son, Ian Charles, who died in 1884. The last vacant niche will be filled by the coffin of the late Countess. In the mausoleum on Thursday the coffins of husband and son were to be seen, lying side by side. That of the Countess, now rejoining in the silence of the tomb those whose early deaths threw a shadow over the greater portion of her life, was placed temporarily at right angles to the others. The latter were still covered with wreaths, the Countess, up to a comparatively recent date, having regularly visited the mausoleum. The three coffins will now be placed together in a common recess, and the mausoleum will then be permanently closed. After the chief mourners had left the mausoleum, after the office for the death had been fully recited, when all had been done for the honoured dead that devoted mourners could do, an opportunity was given to the company of filing past the coffin and of seeing where three members of the great family are sleeping their last long sleep.

== Assessment ==
- James Cameron, the Duthil author, writing in 1899:
  Lady Seafield has the credit of being one of the most exemplary, the most liberal, the most charitable and generous, both as an individual and as a proprietrix north side of the Grampians, if not in a wider circle. In this respect she stands in the first rank of women.
- Sir Robert Bruce Lockhart, remembering his childhood holidays in Strathspey in My Scottish Youth:
  She settled down at Castle Grant and Cullen to devote the rest of her life to good works. She carried out her duties as a great landowner and as chieftain of Clan Grant with scrupulous attention to detail. She visited all her tenants regularly, and, by patting their children on the head and listening to their troubles, identified herself with their lives. ... Undoubtedly she was imperious, regarding her wishes as law throughout her domains. (And yet) By the vast majority of tenants she was loved with much the same veneration and pride that the British public lavished on Queen Victoria. She was the last of the great feudal chiefs.
- Lord Strathspey, in his A History of Clan Grant (1983) asserted that, while 'she had enormous power in her lifetime', by the time she died 'very few of the inhabitants actually knew her at all, since she did not go round much.' He did give credit, however, to her management of the estates: 'during her life she kept the estates intact and tried to pay off the debt, which, in fact, she nearly succeeding in doing – an achievement much to her credit.' Lord Strathspey was particularly critical of the Countess Dowager's policy of keeping at a long distance those who inherited her son's titles of honour: the Earl of Seafield, the 10th Earl of Seafield and the 11th Earl of Seafield. 'All family contacts with her ... were through her law agent. Through him she sent various members of the family periodic small remittances ... and they were, it would thus appear, paid to keep away.'
