= Presbytery of Abernethy =

The Presbytery of Abernethy was one of the presbyteries of the Church of Scotland, being the local presbytery for the area of Abernethy. The last clerk was the Rev. Catherine Buchan, who is minister of Kingussie linked with Newtonmore & Laggan Churches. The presbytery represented and supervised twelve Church of Scotland congregations within the area. It was one of the smallest presbyteries, having had only five charges within it. It was abolished on 1 January 2024 uniting with other presbyteries to form a single presbytery covering the Highlands and Hebrides.(https://www.churchofscotland.org.uk/contact/presbytery-list)

== Parishes ==
Church of Scotland Parish	Buildings	Link	Minister	Population Served
Abernethy	Abernethy Parish Church, Nethy Bridge (MED)		Vacant	1,069
Boat of Garten, Carrbridge and Kincardine	St Columba's, Boat of Garten (1900); Carrbridge Church; Kincardine Church (MED)		Vacant	1,339
Alvie and Insh	Insh Church, Kincraig		Charles. J Finnie	715
Rothiemurchus and Aviemore	St Andrew's, Aviemore (1902)		Charles. J Finnie	3,711
Kingussie	Kingussie Parish Church (MED); Insh Village Church		Catherine A. Buchan	1,855
Laggan & Newtonmore	Laggan Parish Church (MED); St Bride's, Newtonmore (MED)		Catherine A. Buchan	266
Laggan & Newtonmore	Laggan Parish Church (MED); St Bride's, Newtonmore (MED)		Catherine A. Buchan	1,094
Cromdale and Advie	Cromdale		Gordon I. Strang	635
Dulnain Bridge	Dulnain Bridge		Gordon I. Strang	486
Grantown-on-Spey (Inverallan)	Inverallan Parish Church, Grantown-on-Spey (MED)		Gordon I. Strang	2,506
Tomintoul, Glenlivet and Inveravon	Tomintoul; Inveravon		Vacant In Guardianship	1,519

=== External links ===
- https://abernethypresbytery.com/

=== See also ===
- Church of Scotland
- List of Church of Scotland synods and presbyteries
