= Duthil =

Coordinates: 57.297°N 3.770°W

Duthil: Scottish Gaelic: Daothal
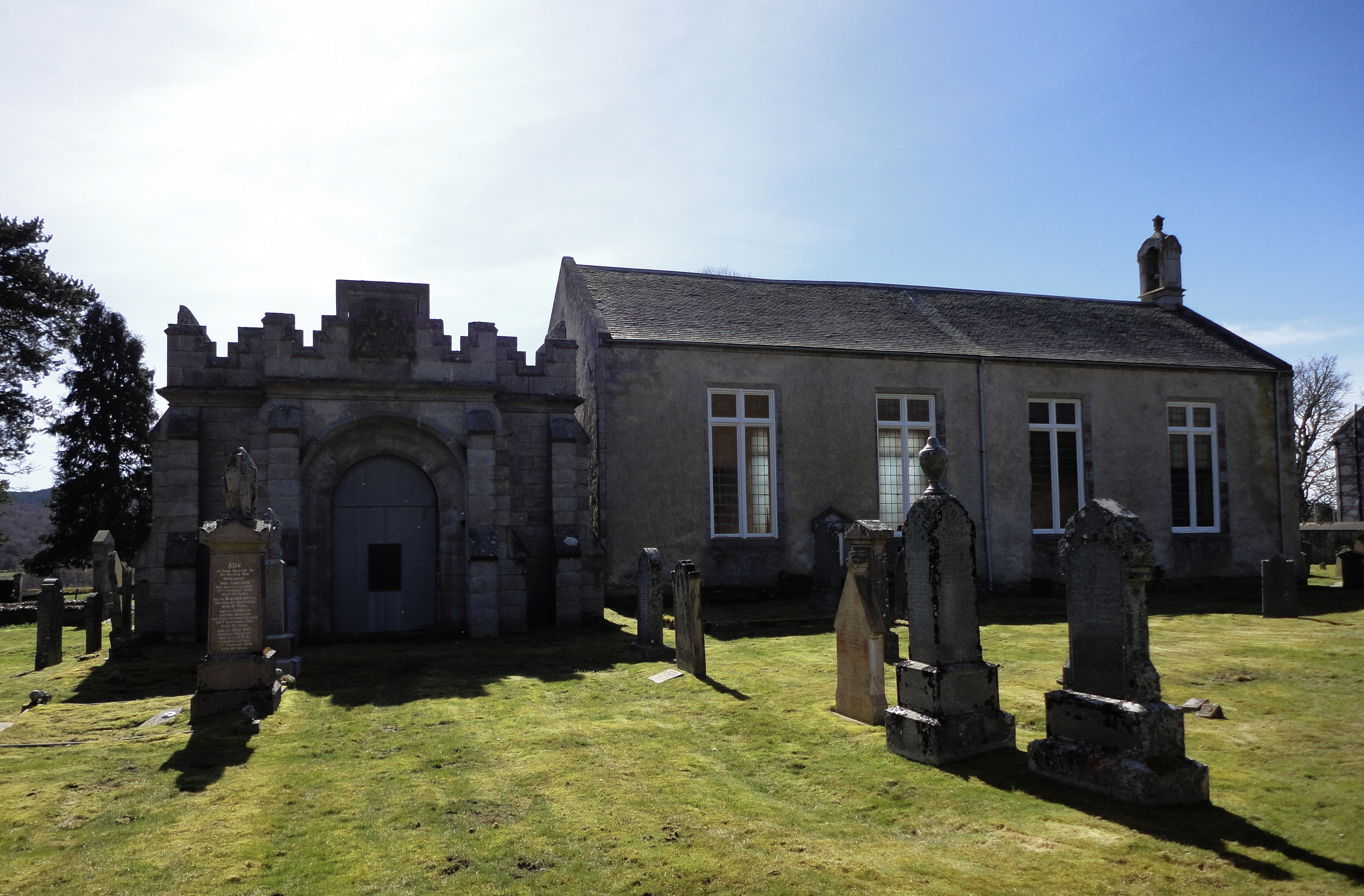
- Duthil Old Parish Church and Churchyard.

- Location within the Badenoch and Strathspey area
- OS grid reference: NH935241
- Council area: Highland
- Country: Scotland
- Sovereign state: United Kingdom
- Post town: Carrbridge
- Postcode district: PH23 3
- Police: Scotland
- Fire: Scottish
- Ambulance: Scottish

Duthil (Scottish Gaelic: Daothal) is a small village, bypassed by the A938 road, at the junction with the road B9007, near Carrbridge in Inverness-shire, Scottish Highlands and is in the Scottish council area of Highland.

Just outside the village lies Duthil Old Parish Church and Burial Ground, which includes many memorials to members of Clan Grant and two mausolea of the Earls of Seafield.

== Notable people ==
- Rev Ewan Macleod (1847-1928) minister of Duthil Free Church 1876 to 1895, Moderator of the General Assembly of the Free Church of Scotland 1905/06
