= Colquhoun baronets of Colquhoun (1625) =

Escutcheon of the Colquhoun baronets of Colquhoun

The Colquhoun baronetcy, of Colquhoun in the County of Dumbarton, was created in the Baronetage of Nova Scotia on 30 August 1625 for John Colquhoun, of Luss and Tilliquhoun. He was Member for Dumbartonshire in the Parliament of Scotland in 1620. He married that year Lilian, daughter of John Graham, 4th Earl of Montrose, and in 1632 lost his estates as a result of a legal case over the seduction of her sister.

On 30 March 1704 the 5th Baronet resigned his baronetcy to the Crown and on 29 April of the same year was granted a new patent, with the old precedence, but with remainder to his son-in-law James Grant and the heirs male of his marriage with his daughter. The 6th Baronet assumed the surname of Colquhoun, but in 1719 he resumed the surname of Grant; on 24 June 1721 he was created Lord Grant in the Jacobite peerage. He sat as Member of Parliament for Inverness-shire and Elgin Burghs. The 7th and 8th Baronets also sat as Members of Parliament.

In 1811 the 9th Baronet succeeded as 5th Earl of Seafield through his grandmother Lady Margaret Ogilvy, the daughter of James Ogilvy, 4th Earl of Findlater and 1st Earl of Seafield. On his succession to the earldom of Seafield, he assumed the additional surname of Ogilvy, styling himself Grant-Ogilvy.

== Colquhoun baronets, of Colquhoun (1625) ==
- Sir John Colquhoun, 1st Baronet (died c. 1650)
- Sir John Colquhoun, 2nd Baronet (c. 1622–1676)
- Sir James Colquhoun, 3rd Baronet (died c.1680)
- Sir James Colquhoun, 4th Baronet (died c.1688)
- Sir Humphrey Colquhoun, 5th Baronet (died c.1718)
- Sir James Grant, 6th Baronet (1679–1747)
- Sir Ludovick Grant, 7th Baronet (1707–1773)
- Sir James Grant, 8th Baronet (1738–1811)
- Sir Ludovick Alexander Grant, 9th Baronet (1767–1840), who succeeded as Earl of Seafield in 1811.

Coat of arms of Lord Strathspey with the badge of a Baronet of Nova Scotia as heir of the Colquhoun baronetcy of 1625.

See Earl of Seafield and Baron Strathspey for further succession.
