= James Ogilvy (disambiguation) =

James Ogilvy (born 1964) is a British landscape designer and relative of the British royal family.

James Ogilvy may also refer to:

- James Ogilvy, 5th Lord Ogilvy of Airlie (died 1606), Scottish landowner and diplomat
- James Ogilvy, 1st Earl of Airlie (1593–1666), Scottish royalist
- James Ogilvy, 4th Earl of Findlater (1664–1730), Scottish politician
- James Ogilvy, 5th Earl of Findlater (c. 1688–1764), Scottish peer
- James Ogilvy, 6th Earl of Findlater (c. 1714–1770), Scottish earl
- James Ogilvy, 7th Earl of Findlater (1750–1811), Scottish peer, amateur landscape architect and philanthropist

== See also ==
- James Ogilvie (disambiguation)
