= Francis William Grant (1814–1840) =

Scottish politician (1814–1840)

Francis William Grant (5 October 1814 – 11 March 1840) (also known as Francis Ogilvy-Grant, and Francis Ogilvie-Grant) was a Scottish politician who served, briefly, as member of the UK Parliament for Inverness-shire, but died aged 25 at his mother's funeral.

== Biography ==
Francis Grant was born on 5 October 1814, the son of Francis William Grant, who went on to be the 6th Earl of Seafield, and his wife Mary Anne Dunn, daughter of John Charles Dunn, a rich merchant in India.

Grant senior was a member of parliament for 38 years; at the time of his son's birth, siting for Elginshire. Francis Grant's uncle, Ludovick Grant-Ogilvy, 5th Earl of Seafield, the brother of Grant senior, had also been an MP for Elginshire.

Francis Grant became MP for Inverness-shire in 1838, aged 23, at a by-election occasioned by the resignation of the sitting MP, Alexander Chisholm.

Grant's mother died in March 1840; Francis Grant travelled to the family seat, Cullen House, for the funeral, but was found dead in his bed on 11 March 1840. Mother and son were buried on the same day, interred in a new family mausoleum at Duthill parish church.
