= James Ogilvy, 5th Earl of Findlater =

Scottish peer (c.1688–1764)

The Right Honourable The Earl of Findlater
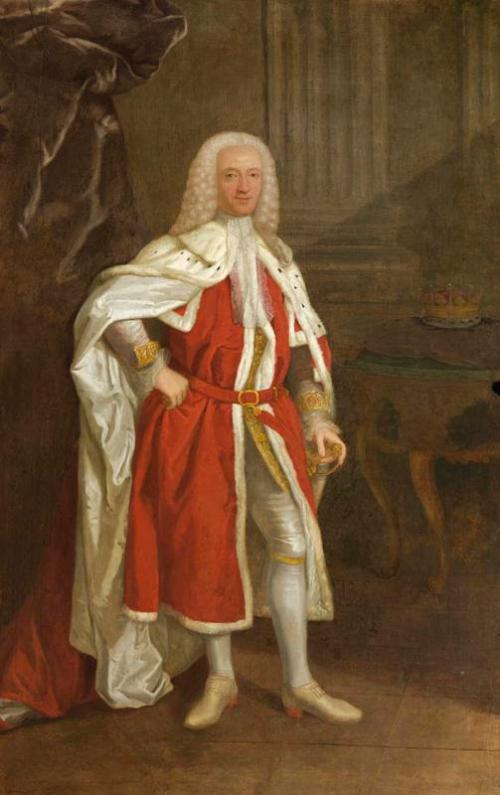

Scottish representative peer
- In office 4 June 1734 – 20 March 1761

Personal details
- Born: James Ogilby c. 1688
- Died: 9 July 1764 (aged 75–76)
- Spouse(s): Lady Elizabeth Hay (m. 1714, died) Lady Sophia Hope (after 1723)
- Children: Anne Hope, Countess of Hopetoun; Lady Margaret Grant; James Ogilvy, 6th Earl of Findlater
- Parent(s): James Ogilvy, 1st Earl of Seafield; Anne Dunbar

James Ogilvy, 5th Earl of Findlater and 2nd Earl of Seafield (c. 1688 – 9 July 1764) was a Scottish peer.

== Early life ==
James was born c. 1688. He was the son of James Ogilvy, 1st Earl of Seafield and the former Anne Dunbar. His father, the Lord Chancellor of Scotland and Keeper of the Great Seal of Scotland under Queen Anne, was created Viscount of Seafield in 1698 and Earl of Seafield in 1701, both in the Peerage of Scotland.

His paternal grandparents were James Ogilvy, 3rd Earl of Findlater and Lady Anne Montgomerie (a daughter of Hugh Montgomerie, 7th Earl of Eglinton). His maternal grandfather was Sir William Dunbar, 1st Baronet.

== Career ==
In 1715, he was incarcerated in Edinburgh Castle as a suspected Jacobite during the Rebellion. Upon his father's death on 15 August 1730, he succeeded as the 2nd Viscount of Seafield, 2nd Viscount of Reidhaven, 2nd Earl of Seafield, 5th Earl of Findlater, 2nd Lord Ogilvy of Cullen, and 2nd Lord Ogilvy of Deskford.

He served as Lord of Police for Scotland between 1734 and 1742 and was appointed a Scottish representative peer between 1734 and 1761. From 1737 to 1764, he held the office of Vice-Admiral of Scotland.

During the Jacobite rising of 1745, Cullen House was ransacked while Lord Findlater and his wife were traveling to Aberdeen to meet the Duke of Cumberland, who was pursuing Bonny Prince Charlie's Jacobite army. While they were away, a group of Charles's supporters forced their way into the house and ransacked it, carrying off as much as possible and destroying what could not be easily transported. Three days later, continuing his pursuit that would end at the Battle of Culloden, Cumberland arrived at the scene accompanied by Findlater to find the doors of the house forced open, the windows broken and broken furniture and discarded papers strewn around the grounds. Findlater subsequently petitioned Parliament for the sum of £8,000 in compensation for the losses incurred, but it is not clear whether he ever received any payment. (Note: £8,000 in 1746 equates to approximately £1,500,000 in 2025, according to calculations based on retail price index measure of inflation.)

Lord Findlater provided financial support for Colin Morison and James Clarke to study art in Italy.

== Personal life ==
In 1714, Lord Findlater was married to Lady Elizabeth Hay, second daughter of Thomas Hay, 7th Earl of Kinnoull. Together, they were the parents of:

- Lady Anne Ogilvy (d. 1759), who married John Hope, 2nd Earl of Hopetoun.
- Lady Margaret Ogilvy (d. 1757), married Sir Ludovick Grant, 7th Baronet, MP for Elginshire, a son of Sir James Grant, 6th Baronet. Their grandson Ludovick Grant succeeded as 5th Earl of Seafield upon the death of the 4th Earl in 1811.
- James Ogilvy, 3rd Earl of Seafield (c. 1714–1770), who married Lady Mary Murray, second daughter of John Murray, 1st Duke of Atholl.

After the death of his first wife, he remarried to Lady Sophia Hope on 14 December 1723. She was a daughter of Charles Hope, 1st Earl of Hopetoun and Lady Henrietta Johnstone (a daughter of William Johnstone, 1st Marquess of Annandale). Ten years after their marriage, Lady Sophia's brother, the 2nd Earl of Hopetoun, married Lord Findlater's eldest daughter, Lady Anne.

Lord Findlater died at Cullen House on 9 July 1764, and was succeeded by his son James. His grandson, James Ogilvy, 7th Earl of Findlater, was an accomplished amateur landscape architect and philanthropist.

Peerage of Scotland
Preceded by James Ogilvy	Earl of Findlater; Earl of Seafield; 1730–1764	Succeeded by James Ogilvy
