= James Ogilvie =

James Ogilvie may refer to:

- James Ogilvie (bishop) (died 1518), Scottish prelate
- James Ogilvie of Cardell (died 1578), Scottish courtier
- James Nicoll Ogilvie (1860–1926), Scottish minister
- James Ogilvie (coach) (c. 1866–1950), American football player and coach

== See also ==
- James Ogilvie-Grant, 9th Earl of Seafield (1817–1888), Scottish peer and member of parliament
- James Ogilvie-Grant, 11th Earl of Seafield (1876–1915), Scottish nobleman
- Odie Cleghorn (James Albert Ogilvie Cleghorn, 1891–1956), Canadian ice hockey player, coach, linesman and referee
- James Ogilvy (disambiguation)
