= Sir James Grant, 8th Baronet =

Scottish landowner, politician and military officer (1738–1811)

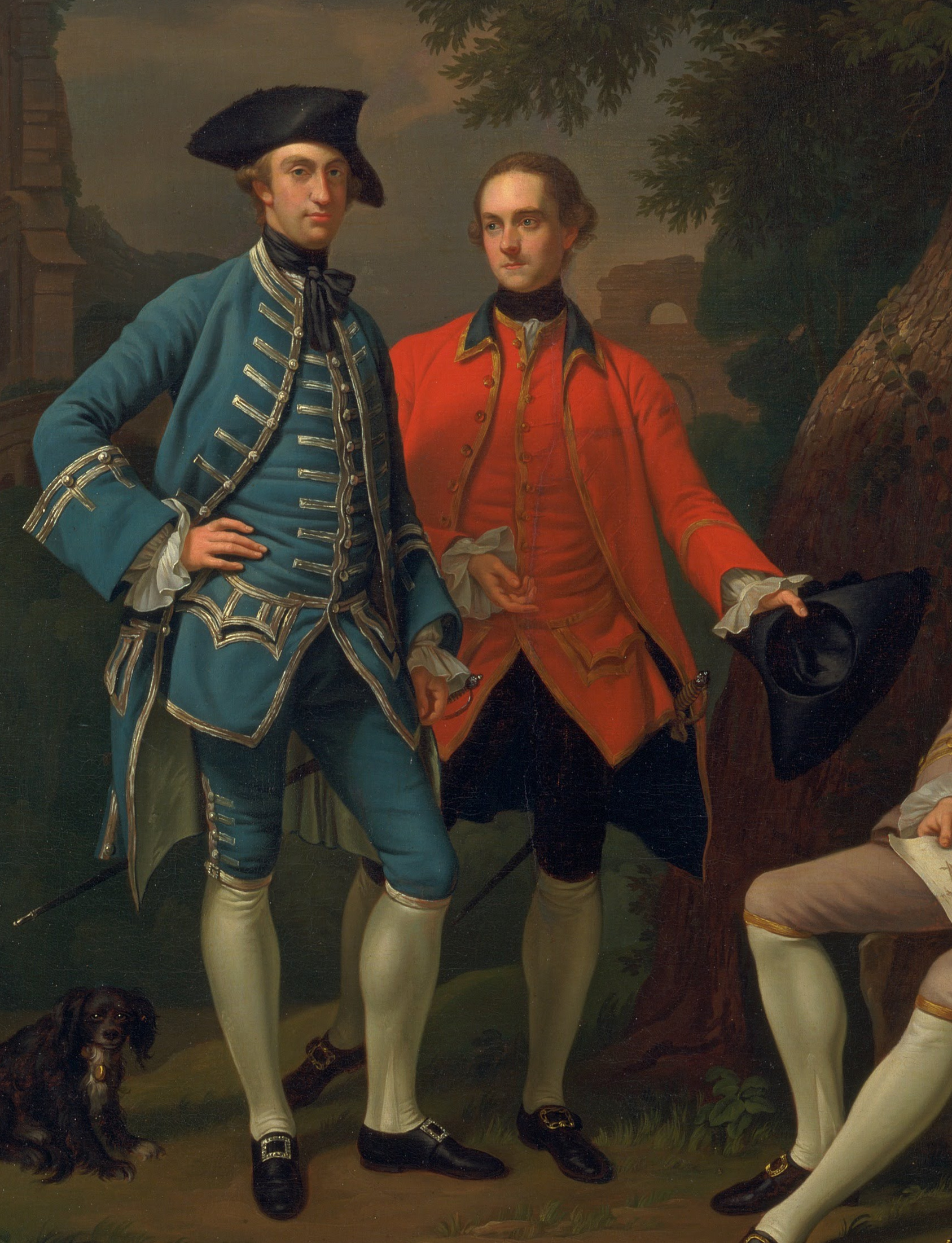
c. 1760 portrait of Grant (left) by Nathaniel Dance

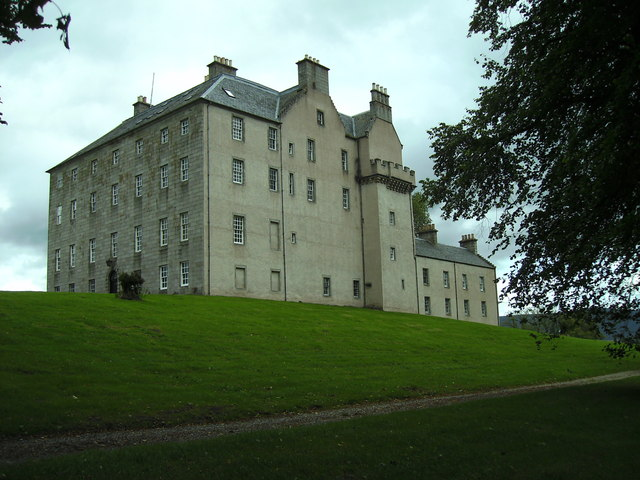
Castle Grant from the front

Sir James Grant of Grant, 8th Baronet, FRSE, FSA Scot (19 May 1738 – 18 February 1811) was a Scottish landowner, politician and military officer. He was often referred to as the Good Sir James.

== Life ==
Grant was the son of Sir Ludovick Grant, 7th Baronet, and Lady Margaret Ogilvy, daughter of James Ogilvy, 2nd Earl of Seafield. Born at Cullen House, Moray, Scotland, he was educated at Westminster School and Christ's College, Cambridge. Grant succeeded his father as Member of Parliament for Elginshire in 1761, a seat he held until 1768. In 1773 Grant succeeded his father as eighth Baronet of Colquhoun. In 1783 he was a co-founder of the Royal Society of Edinburgh and served as its first Physical President.

From 1790 to 1795 he was MP for Banffshire. He also served as Lord Lieutenant of Inverness-shire. He was colonel of a fencible regiment, the Grant Fencible Regiment raised in 1793. He died at the family seat of Castle Grant in February 1811, aged 72, and was succeeded by his son Ludovick Alexander Grant, who later that year succeeded his second cousin as fifth Earl of Seafield.

== Family ==
In 1763, Grant married Jean Duff, daughter of Alexander Duff, 2nd of Hatton, and Lady Anne Duff, daughter of William Duff, 1st Earl Fife. They had 14 children, seven of whom survived to adulthood. Lady Grant died in 1805. Their children included Ludovick Alexander Ogilvy-Grant, 5th Earl of Seafield FRSE (1767–1840) and Col. Francis William Ogilvy-Grant, 6th Earl of Seafield (1778–1853). His sister, Penuel Grant, married the Scottish author, Henry Mackenzie. Grant was a cousin to James Lind.

== See also ==
- Grant or Strathspey Fencibles
- Earl of Seafield

Parliament of the United Kingdom
Preceded by Sir Ludovick Grant	Member of Parliament for Elginshire; 1761–1768	Succeeded by Francis Grant
Preceded by James Ferguson	Member of Parliament for Banffshire; 1790–1795	Succeeded by David McDowall-Grant
Honorary titles
New office	Lord Lieutenant of Inverness-shire; 1794–1809	Succeeded by Francis Ogilvy-Grant
Baronetage of Nova Scotia
Preceded by Ludovick Grant	Baronet (of Colquhoun); 1773–1811	Succeeded by Ludovick Alexander Grant
