= Dumbartonshire (Parliament of Scotland constituency) =

Before the Acts of Union 1707, the barons of the shire of Dumbarton elected commissioners to represent them in the unicameral Parliament of Scotland and in the Convention of the Estates.

From 1708 Dunbartonshire was represented by one Member of Parliament in the House of Commons of Great Britain.

== List of shire commissioners ==
- 1593: Sir James Seton of Touch
- 1593: Sir James Edmonstone of Duntreath
- 1608: Sir Aulay MacAulay of Ardincaple
- 1612: Alexander Colquhoun of Luss
- 1617: William Semple of Fulwood
- 1621: John Colquhoun of Luss
- 1621: Henry Stirling of Ardoch
- 1628–33, 1645, 1649 and 1651: Sir Ludovic Houston of that Ilk
- 1630: name not known
- 1633: James Muirhead of Lachop, yr
- 1639–41, 1648: Duncan Campbell of Carrick
- 1640–41; 1643–49: Sir Humphrey Colquhoun of Balvie
- 1643, 1645–47, 1648–49: William Semple of Fulwood
- 1650, 1661–63, 1665 convention, 1667 convention and 1669–74: Sir John Colquhoun of Luss
- 1661–63, 1665 convention, 1667 convention, 1669–74: John Napier of Kilmahew
- 1678 convention: William Hamilton of Orbiston
- 1678 convention and 1681–82: Sir Patrick Houston of that Ilk
- 1681–82: William Noble of Dalnotter
- 1685–86: Nicoll Buntine of Ardoch
- 1685–86: Alexander Gartshore of that Ilk
- 1689 (convention), 1689–1702: Claude Hamilton of Barnes
- 1689 (convention), 1689–98: William Colquhoun of Craigtoun
- 1700–01: John Haldane of Gleneagles
- 1702–07: William Cochrane of Kilmaranock
- 1702–07: Sir Humphrey Colquhoun of Luss

== See also ==
- List of constituencies in the Parliament of Scotland at the time of the Union
