= Gaussig House =

Historic manor in Saxony, Germany

Coordinates: 51°08′02″N 14°18′57″E

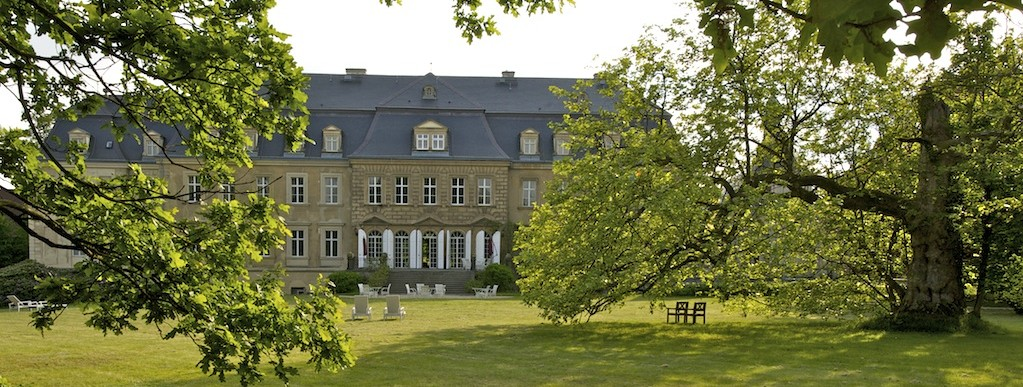
Gaussig House

Gaussig House is a manor house in Palladian style located in the district Bautzen in the German state of Saxony approximately 6 km southwest from the Upper Lusatian central city Bautzen. Extending over some 75 acres (300,000 m^{2}), nestled in beautiful natural surroundings and bordered by the Grosse Picho hill to the south, lies one of Upper Lusatia’s largest landscape parks. Gaussig House, the orangery, the church and vicarage, and the estate form the centre of Gaussig village.

A manor house at Gaussig was first mentioned in 1245. Major General and Colonel Rudolph von Neitschütz received Gaussig as a fief in 1696, and around 1700 he and his wife, Ursula, had Gaussig House built in the Baroque style.

From 1747 to 1750, the new owner, Count Heinrich von Brühl, had a Baroque garden landscaped according to plans by master builder Johann Christoph Knöffel. The round pavilion (since 2009 under reconstruction) and the canal are the two surviving features of this garden.

After Count von Brühl, Count Hermann Carl von Keyserlingk, the Russian ambassador to the court of Saxony, took over Gaussig. In 1800 Countess Henriette von Schall-Riaucour, probably with assistance from master builder Christian Friedrich Schuricht and Lord Findlater, had the park landscaped in the design that survives to this day. Schuricht redesigned Gaussig House in the neo-classical Palladian style, with plaster imitation ashlar masonry on the projections, and lions’ heads and tapestries in the arch bays. The entrance area was also redesigned during this period (entrance hall with Ionic columns), as was the garden room, with herms supporting the pediment over the side doors.

The cemetery was added in 1880 and the chapel in 1894. In 1907 the extension for the library on the south side of the house was completed and several rooms were redesigned. After the property was expropriated in 1945, it was used by the Red Army and later by the CDU. From 1950 to 1992 the park was managed by the Technische Universität Dresden, which used Gaussig House as a recreation venue for academic staff and for conferences.

In 2005 Andreas Graf von Brühl-Pohl and his family took over ownership of Gaussig House and Park. The house was carefully renovated and restored to its former glory over the course of three years, and the magnificent building now serves both as the von Brühl-Pohl family’s residence and as a luxurious hotel.

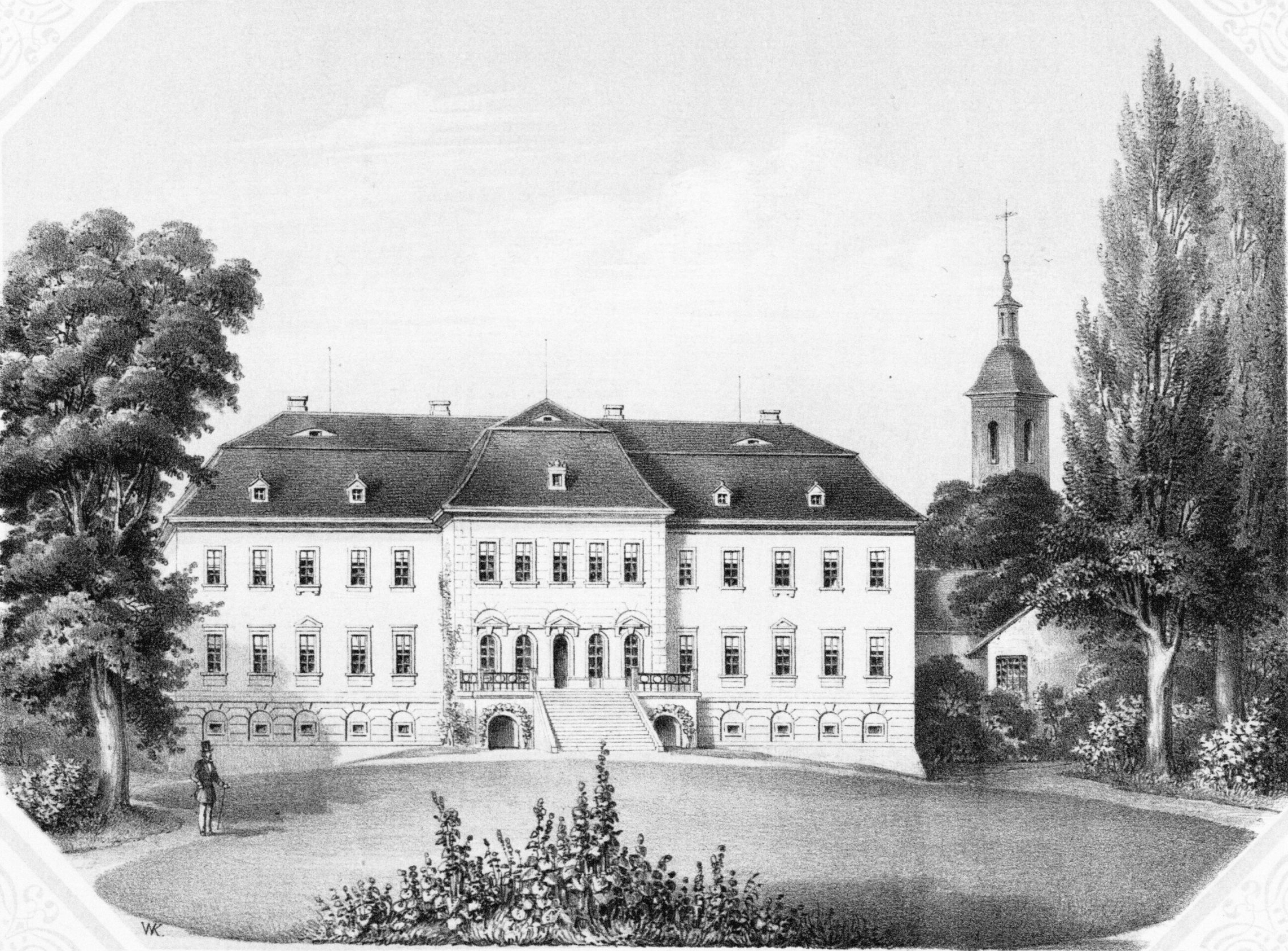
Gaussig House in the 19th century

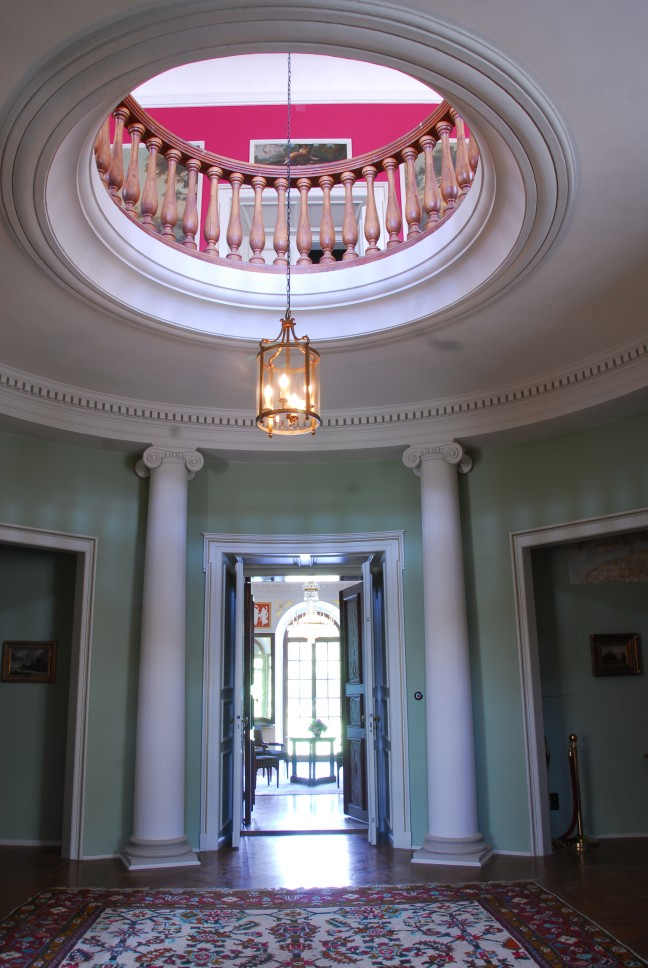
Vestibule

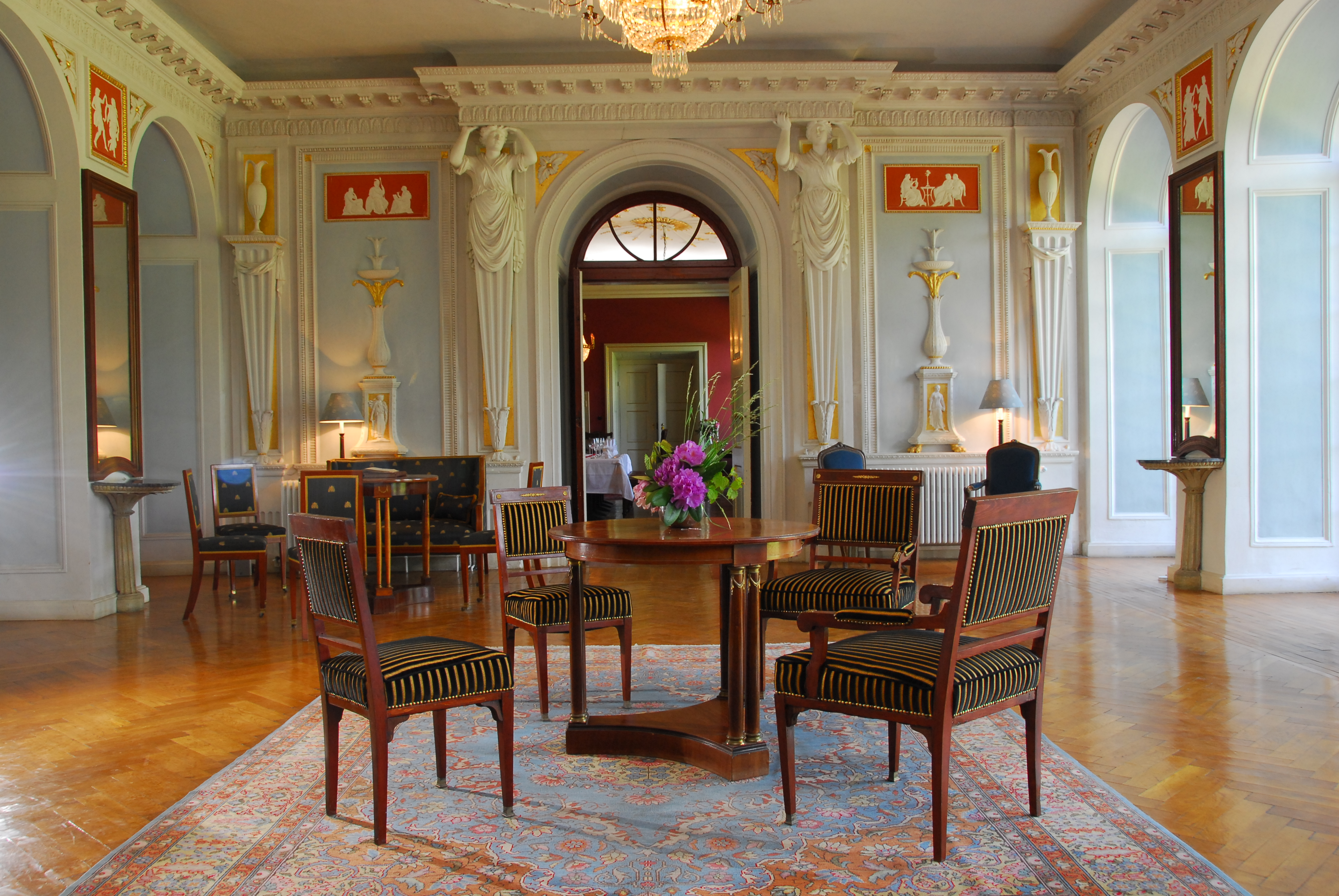
Garden room

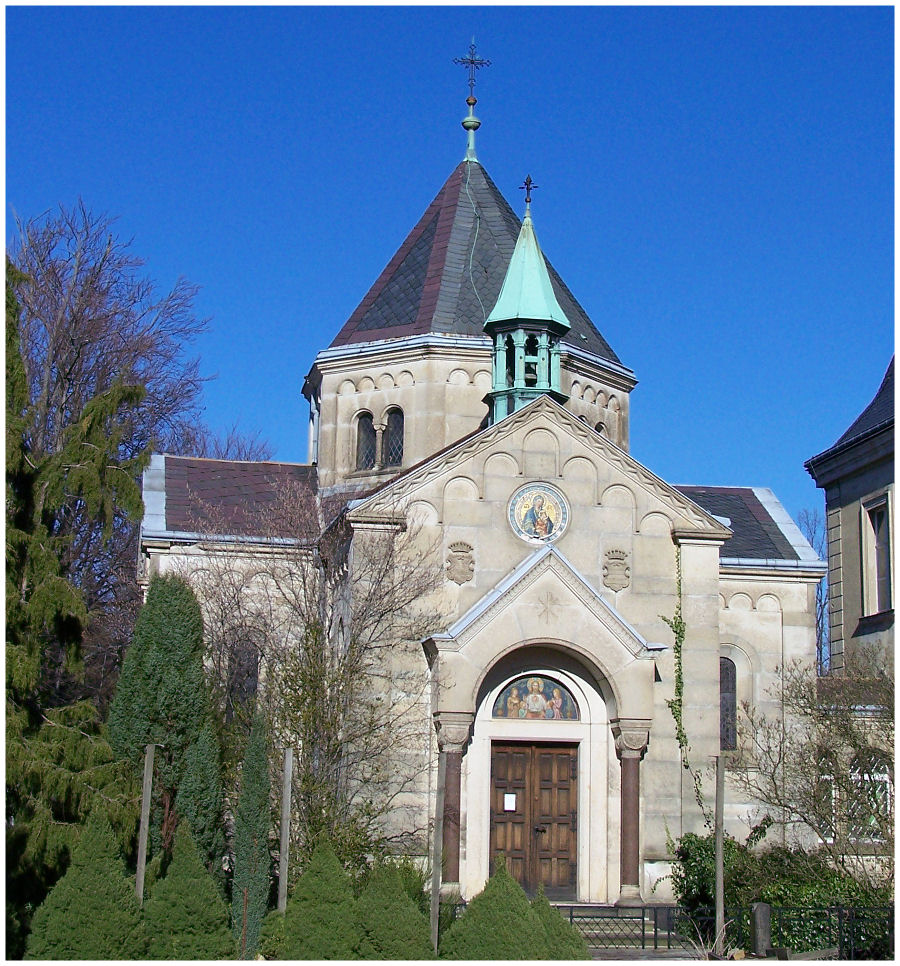
Chapel

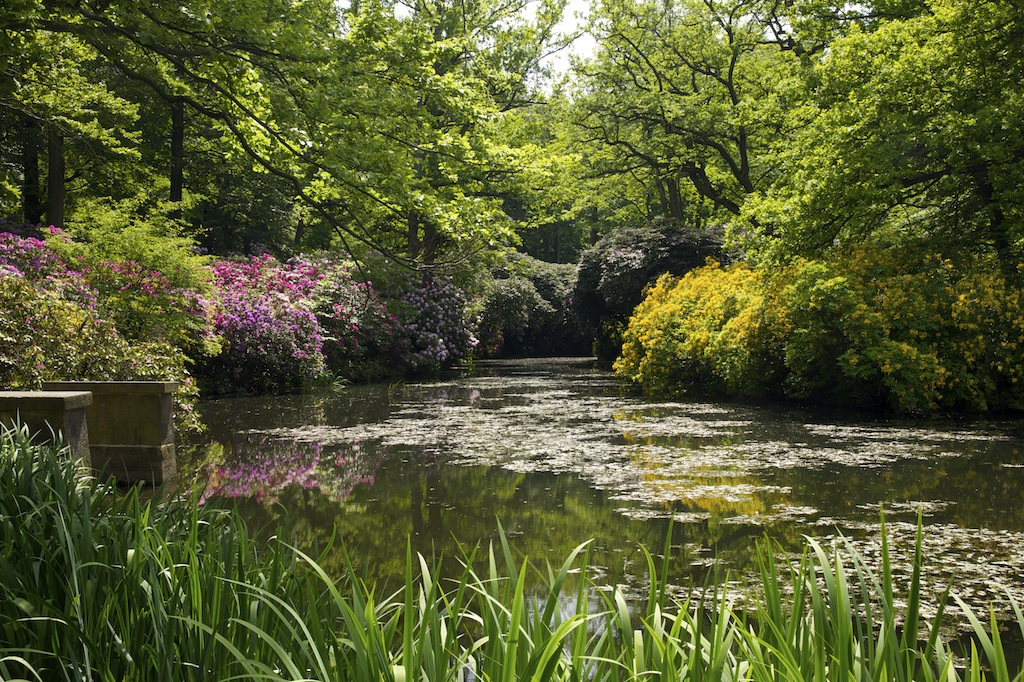
Pond

== Sources ==
- Dehio, Georg (1996). Sachsen I, Regierungsbezirk Dresden. Handbuch der Deutschen Kunstdenkmäler. Deutscher Kunstverlag. ISBN 978-3-422-03043-5.
- Donath Matthias; & Dannenberg, Lars-Arne (2008). Schlösser in der westlichen und mittleren Oberlausitz. Meißen: Redaktions- und Verl.-Ges. Elbland.
- Hasse, Friedrich Christian August (1804). Dresden und die umliegende Gegend.
- Heinrich, Reinhart (1987). Jenseits von Babel. Berlin: Verlag Neues Leben Berlin. ISBN 3-355-00360-3.
- Panse, Ernst (1999). Palladisches Schloß im Dornröschenschlaf. Schloßpark Gaußig. In Ders. (Ed.), Parkführer durch die Oberlausitz, pp.89-94. Bautzen: Lusatia Verlag. ISBN 3-929091-56-9.
- Puppe, Roland; Melzer, Stefanie; & Jäger, Stephanie (2006). Sachsen Grün: Die sehenswertesten 72 Gärten und Parks. L&H Verlag. ISBN 978-3938608029.
- Schlesinger, Walter (1965). Sachsen. Handbuch der historischen Stätten Deutschlands. Alfred Kröner Verlag. ISBN 978-3520312013.
