= Alexander Chisholm (MP) =

Alexander William Chisholm, 25th of Chisholm (15 February 1810 – 8 September 1838) was a Scottish landowner, chief of Clan Chisholm, and member of the UK Parliament for Inverness-shire from 1835 to 1838. He inherited his father's lands at age 7, but met an untimely death aged 28, arising from an aortic aneurysm, shortly after resigning his parliamentary seat.

He was, in 1831, responsible for contributing to the Highland Clearances by evicting the majority of the settled and ancient tenantry from his lands in Strathglass.

== Biography ==
=== Education ===
Alexander Chisholm was born 15 February 1810 in Castlehill, Inverness, the son of William Chisholm, 24th Chief of Clan Chisholm, and Elizabeth, daughter of Duncan MacDonell XIV of Glengarry. The family seat was Erchless Castle, to the south-west of Inverness. Upon the death of his father in 1817 the chieftaincy fell to the seven-year-old Alexander, and his father's lands were administered in his name by a set of guardians - his mother; Charles Grant, 1st Baron Glenelg; John Peter Grant; Sir Hugh Innes, 1st Baronet; and William MacKenzie of Muirton (1780-1856).

Alexander Chisholm and his younger brother Duncan Macdonell (5 August 1811 – 1858) were sent to the Rev. William Reid in Midsomer Norton for their education; but Chisholm, suffering from rheumatic fever, was moved to Clifton, Weymouth, Malvern and Bath – two of them spa towns, all associated with 'taking the cure'. The boys were next passed into the educational care of the Rev. Henry Fendall, vicar of Nazeing, Essex; and in the autumn of 1822 the 12-year old Chisholm and his brother were transferred to Eton College. Alfred Ollivant was engaged as their private tutor, a position he held until 1825, after which the Rev. Edward Coleridge (1800-1883) became their tutor.

The Chisholms left Eton in early in 1828, and were placed under the charge of the Rev. James S. M. Anderson (1800–1869), Chaplain in Ordinary to the Queen, residing in Brighton, until, in October 1828, Alexander went to Trinity College, Cambridge, where he entered under the tuition of the Rev. George Peacock. He remained there for three years. Although he fared well in the first year of his studies, he missed the second year examinations owing to ill health, and left in his third year without the award of a degree; James Anderson commented that "he had not always been proof against the temptations to idleness which beset the path of the young".

=== Landowner ===
In 1831, aged 21 and coming into his majority, Chisholm relocated to Invernessshire and Erchless Castle after an absence, short visits aside, of 14 years; and assumed direct control of his estate from his guardians. His biographers note then when he was 14, Chisholm recommended to his guardians that outstanding rents owed by certain tenants should be forgiven; and during the later period of guardianship, tenants were permitted to remain in possession of holdings in circumstances warranting their eviction.

In 1831, he determined to take "an active part in plans for ameliorating" the condition of the people on his properties; however the said amelioration took the form of evicting a large number of the ancient tenantry of his forebears in accordance with - as a biographer terms it -" the mistaken views which then so extensively prevailed of improving the condition of the Highland people by clearing them out of their native glens to make room for sheep and deer."

Chisholm added insult to injury, arranging for all of his tenants, anxious about impending expirations of their tenancies, to meet on a certain day at the Inn of Cannich in the expectation that he would announce the terms of renewals. Instead, Chisholm simply did not attend the meering; hours after the appointed time, his factor arrived at the meeting place to announce that he has no instructions from Chisholm to renew leases. It later transpired that Chisholm had let "the best farms and the best grazing lands" to "shepherds from other countries, leaving half the number of the native population without house and home.

James Anderson, in his Memoirs... notes that the population of Chisholm's estate had not been large; a 1745 roll suggest Clan Chisholm had been capable of mustering 200 fighting men; but several waves of emigration from 1790 onwards - mainly to Glengarry in Canada - had depleted the populace. For a period of about 7 years, those displaced by the 1831 evictions were settled by Thomas Fraser, 12th Lord Lovat on his lands; but he, too, later evicted them in order to enlarge his deer park. Colin Chisholm asserts that, post-1831, only two native farmers remained on Chisholm's land.

Chisholm's stature as chief of Clan Chisholm does not appear to have suffered; in 1832 he received a loyal address signed by about 80 Canadian Chisholms, many of whom now held public office or prominent positions in Canadian society.

=== Politician ===
Chisholm involved himself in Invernessshire politics from 1831; he seconded the nomination of Charles Grant as Inverness-shire candidate for the 1831 election, and spoke in that year in support of electoral reform, identifying himself as a supporter of the issue championed by Charles Grey, 2nd Earl Grey, and which led to the Reform Act 1832. He appears, though, to have been conservative in his views, refusing to condemn the motives of those - particularly in the House of Lords - who spoke against and blocked the progress of reforms; and he indicated unease about the possibility that civil and religious reform "might be taken too far and degenerate into licence". The point quickly came when he had to break with Earl Grey, over the proposed Church Temporalities Act 1833, and in particular its 147th clause, which permitted the application of church funds to non-ecclesiastical purposes. James Anderson notes that this was the issue that led to the fracture and 1834 dissolution of the Grey cabinet.

Locally, he spoke in favour of the establishment of school in the Highlands, consequent on a report by the Inverness Education Society in 1826 estimating that 80,000 of the Highland's 500,000 pupulation were illiterate; and that many more were poorly educated. Chisholm framed the need as a moral issue connected to the inability of Highlanders to consult the scriptures.

In 1835 he was returned to Parliament, in the Conservative interest, for the county of Inverness, after a keen contest with James Murray Grant of Glenmoriston, by a majority of twenty-eight. At the general election of 1837, caused by the death of King William IV, and the accession of Queen Victoria, Chisholm again came forward as a candidate for the county. He was again opposed by James Murray Grant, whom he succeeded in defeating by a majority of fifty-four.

His Parliamentary duties, however, proved too much for his delicate constitution, and finding himself obliged to be often absent from the House on account of the state of his health, he, in the following spring, determined to resign his seat, and this resolution he intimated to his supporters in an address dated, London, May the 18th, 1838.

He almost immediately proceeded to the North, where he proposed Francis Grant (1814-1840) as his Parliamentary successor, a proposal which was given effect to without opposition.

=== Death ===
Chisholm remained at Erchless until, on the 1 August 1838, he had occasion to go to Inverness on business, where he was seized, in the Caledonian Hotel, with the sudden illness which shortly afterwards terminated his life. He died there unmarried on Saturday, 8 September 1838, at the early age of 28 years. From a post-mortem examination the cause of death was established to be an aortic aneurysm.

In 1842, Rev. James S. M. Anderson, who had cared for the two boys in 1828, wrote a memoir largely drawn from Chisholm's correspondence with his mother.

Parliament of the United Kingdom
Preceded by Charles Grant	Member of Parliament for Inverness-shire; 1835–1838	Succeeded by Francis William Grant
