= James Ogilvy, 3rd Earl of Findlater =

Scottish peer

James Ogilvy, 3rd Earl of Findlater (c. 1640–1711) was a Scottish peer.

He was the son of Patrick Ogilvy, 2nd Earl of Findlater and Lady Elizabeth Ogilvy, daughter of James Ogilvy, 1st Earl of Findlater. His father descended from the Ogilvys of Inchmatine, a minor branch of the Clan Ogilvy, and inherited the title Earl of Findlater upon marrying Lady Elizabeth. He succeeded his father to the Earldom in 1659.

He married, firstly circa 1658, Lady Anne Montgomerie (1632–1687), daughter of Hugh Montgomerie, 7th Earl of Eglinton and Lady Anne Hamilton. They had the following issue:

- Walter Ogilvy, Lord Deskford (1660–1669), heir apparent, died in infancy.
- James Ogilvy, 4th Earl of Findlater (1663–1737), who succeeded and was made 1st Earl of Seafield in 1701.
- Col. Hon. Patrick Ogilvy (c.1665–1737)
- Lady Anna Ogilvy (c.1670–1735), married Sir George Allardice.

The elderly Lord Findlater married, secondly in 1703, Lady Anne Hamilton, daughter of William Hamilton, 2nd Duke of Hamilton. His second marriage was without issue.
