= Francis Ogilvie-Grant, 6th Earl of Seafield =

Scottish nobleman

Colonel The Right Honourable The Earl of Seafield
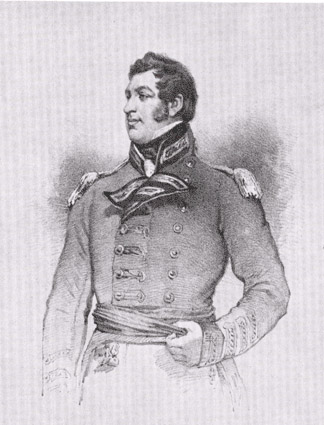

Lord Lieutenant of Inverness
- In office 2 September 1809 – 30 July 1853
- Preceded by: Sir James Grant, Bt.
- Succeeded by: The Lord Lovat

Personal details
- Born: 6 March 1778 Castle Grant, Moray, Scotland
- Died: 30 July 1853 (aged 75) Cullen House, Moray, Scotland
- Spouse: Mary Anne Dunn (m. 1811; died 1840)
- Children: 9, including John and James
- Parent(s): Sir James Grant, 8th Baronet; Jean Duff

Military service
- Allegiance: United Kingdom of Great Britain and Ireland
- Branch/service: British Army
- Rank: Colonel
- Commands: Highland Fencible Corps

Colonel Francis William Ogilvie-Grant, 6th Earl of Seafield (6 March 1778 – 30 July 1853), known for most of his life as Francis William Grant, was a Scottish nobleman, soldier and politician. He is numbered as the 25th Chief of Clan Grant.

== Early life ==
Born on 6 March 1778 as Francis William Grant, he was the second son of Sir James Grant, 8th Baronet (known as "the Good Sir James") and his wife Jean Duff. His mother was daughter of Alexander Duff, 2nd of Hatton, and Lady Anne Duff, herself a daughter of William Duff, 1st Earl Fife.

Owing to the mental incapacity of his brother Lewis Alexander Grant (and the earlier deaths of two older brothers) from 1811, he acted as Curator of the Grant Estates and those of the Seafield Earldom until he succeeded as Earl of Seafield in his own right in 1840.

== Career ==
He began a military career when aged 15 in 1793 as a lieutenant in the Strathspey Fencibles. After time in other regiments, he was commissioned a Lieutenant Colonel in the Third Argyllshire Fencibles in 1799 and served with them as part of the Gibraltar garrison in 1800 and 1801. He received a commission as a full Colonel in the British Army in 1809 on appointment as Lord Lieutenant of Inverness. Meanwhile, 'Colonel Grant', as he was known, entered Parliament and followed a political path.

In 1802, Grant was elected to the House of Commons for Elgin Burghs, a seat he held until 1806, and then represented Inverness Burghs from 1806 to 1807, Elginshire from 1807 to 1832 and Elginshire and Nairnshire from 1832 to 1840. In 1840, he succeeded his elder brother as sixth Earl of Seafield, and sat in the House of Lords as a Scottish representative peer from 1841 until his death in 1853. He therefore attended Parliament for a period of 50 years, voting against the Reform Act 1832 while sitting in the Commons. Sir William Fraser reported, "In politics his Lordship was a Conservative, and during his long public career loyally supported his party. He was a warm supporter of Sir Robert Peel."

A member of the Church of Scotland, Grant was an ordained elder sitting in the Presbytery of Abernethy, which he also for many years represented in the General Assembly.

=== Proprietary ===
Lord Seafield was noted for tree-planting. Sir William Fraser wrote that:

"He was known as the largest planter of trees in Britain... the annals of the Highland and Agricultural Society of Scotland recording that in 1847, that at that date 31,686,482 young trees, Scotch firs, larch, and hardwoods, had been planted under the Earl's direction over an area of 8223 acres.... For these plantations, which were effected in the districts of Cullen, Moray, Strathspey, and Glen Urquhart, the Highland Society awarded to the Earl their gold medal."

Living mainly in Cullen House, his taste for ornamental landscape resulted in remodelling of the house, grounds and nearby town, as well as improvements to other towns within his estates.

In 1826, at Duthil, Lord Seafield instructed the rebuilding of the Parish Church and the erection of the Seafield Mausoleum.

In 1836 he gave access to his lands to representatives of the New Brunswick and Nova Scotia Land Company and expressed his opinion that some of the people of Urquhart might usefully emigrate.

== Personal life ==
On 20 May 1811, he married Mary Anne Dunn, daughter of John Charles Dunn, of Higham House, Sussex.

Lord Seafield died in July 1853, aged 75, and was buried at the mausoleum at Duthil Old Parish Church and Churchyard, just outside the village of Duthil, Inverness-shire. He was succeeded in his titles by his third son, John Charles Ogilvie-Grant.

His elder son, Francis William Grant was briefly MP for Inverness-shire, but predeceased Ogilvie-Grant, dying at Cullen House in 1840 whilst visiting for his mother and Ogilvie-Grant's wife's funeral.

Parliament of the United Kingdom
Preceded by Alexander Brodie	Member of Parliament for Elgin Burghs; 1802–1806	Succeeded by George Skene
Preceded by George Cumming	Member of Parliament for Inverness Burghs; 1806–1807	Succeeded by Peter Baillie
Preceded by James Brodie	Member of Parliament for Elginshire; 1807–1832	Constituency abolished
New constituency	Member of Parliament for Elginshire & Nairnshire; 1832–1840	Succeeded by Charles Lennox Cumming Bruce
Honorary titles
Preceded by Sir James Grant	Lord Lieutenant of Inverness-shire; 1809–1853	Succeeded by The Lord Lovat
Peerage of Scotland
Preceded by Lewis Alexander Ogilvie-Grant	Earl of Seafield; 1840–1853	Succeeded by John Charles Ogilvie-Grant
