= James Brodie (botanist) =

British politician (1744–1824)

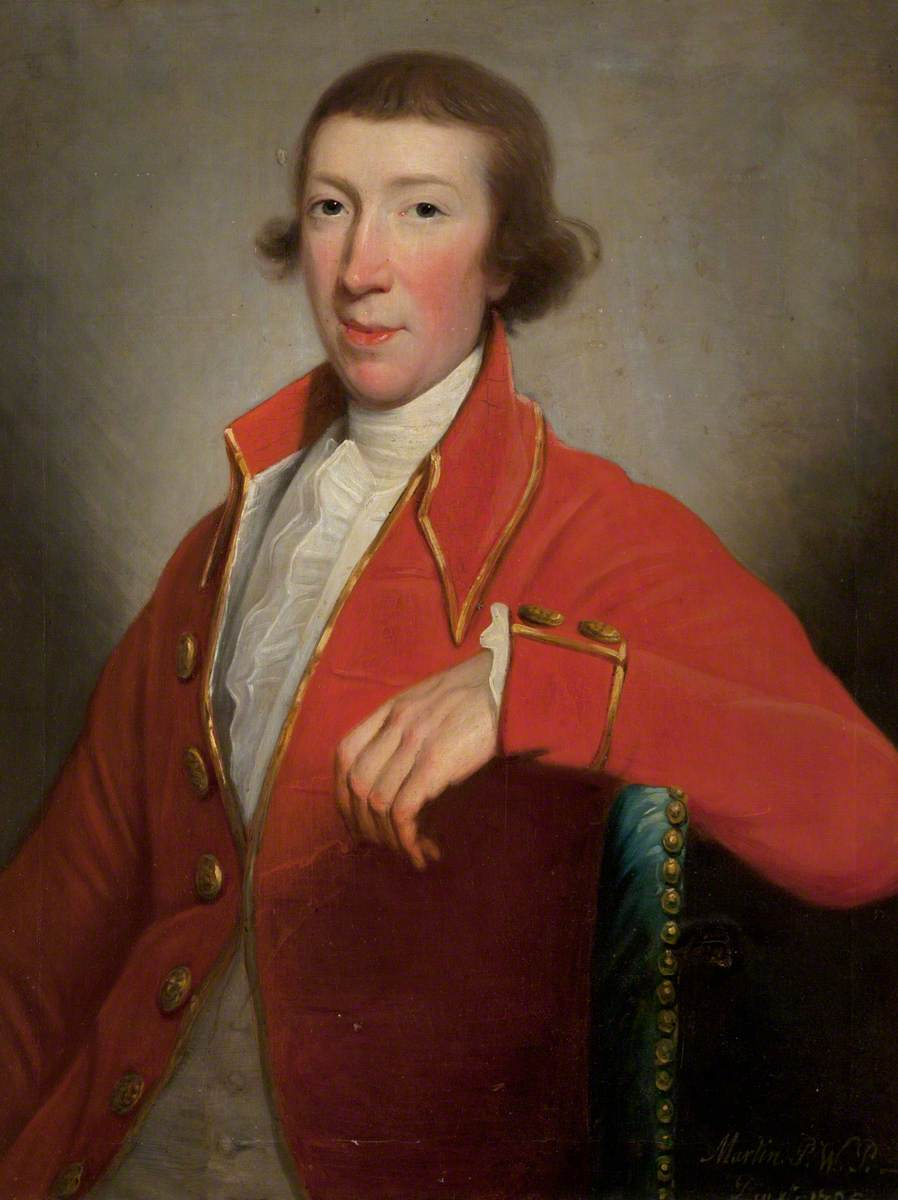
Brodie c. 1790, painting by David Martin

James Brodie of Brodie, 21st Thane and Chief of Clan Brodie, FRS FLS (31 August 1744 – 17 January 1824) was a Scottish politician and botanist. He was educated at Elgin Academy and St. Andrews University. He was returned to parliament in 1796 as MP for Elginshire, serving until 1807. He was appointed Lord Lieutenant of Nairn.

As a botanist, Brodie specialised in cryptogamic flora, i.e. plants which reproduce by spores, such as algae, ferns and mosses. He discovered a number of new species both around Edinburgh and on his own property at Brodie. His collection is now held at the Royal Botanic Garden Edinburgh. He corresponded with other eminent botanists of his time, including Sir William Jackson Hooker and Sir James Edward Smith. Brodie was elected a Fellow of the Linnaean Society in 1795, and of the Royal Society in 1797. The genus Brodiaea is named in his honour.

He married Lady Margaret Duff, sister of James Duff, 2nd Earl Fife, and had two sons and two daughters.

Honorary titles
New office	Lord Lieutenant of Nairn; 1794–1824	Succeeded by William Brodie
Parliament of Great Britain
Preceded by Ludovick Alexander Grant	Member of Parliament for Elginshire; 1796–1800	Succeeded by Parliament of the United Kingdom
Parliament of the United Kingdom
Preceded by Parliament of Great Britain	Member of Parliament for Elginshire; 1801–1807	Succeeded by Francis William Grant
