= Ludovick Grant =

Scottish Member of Parliament

Sir Ludovick Grant, 7th Baronet (13 January 1707 – 18 March 1773) was a Scottish Member of Parliament.

Grant was the son of Sir James Grant, 6th Baronet, and Anne Colquhoun. He succeeded his father as seventh Baronet of Colquhoun in 1747. In 1741 Grant was elected to the House of Commons for Elginshire, a seat he held until 1761. He raised an Independent Highland Company to oppose the Jacobite rising of 1745.

Grant married Lady Margaret Ogilvy (died 1757), daughter of the statesman James Ogilvy, 5th Earl of Findlater and 2nd Earl of Seafield. From this marriage his grandsons would later succeed as Earls of Seafield in 1811.

His final address in Edinburgh is given as Parliament Close.

He died in March 1773, aged 66, and was succeeded by his son, James Grant.

Parliament of Great Britain
Preceded by Alexander Brodie	Member of Parliament for Elginshire; 1741–1761	Succeeded by James Grant
Baronetage of Nova Scotia
Preceded by James Grant	Baronet (of Colquhoun); 1747–1753	Succeeded by James Grant
