= Elginshire (UK Parliament constituency) =

Parliamentary constituency in the United Kingdom, 1801–1832

- Former county constituency for the House of Commons
- Subdivisions of Scotland: Elginshire

1708–1832
- Seats: One
- Created from: Elginshire
- Replaced by: Elginshire & Nairnshire

Elginshire, in Scotland, was a county constituency of the House of Commons of Great Britain from 1708 to 1801 and of the House of Commons of the United Kingdom from 1801 to 1832. It elected one Member of Parliament (MP) using the first-past-the-post voting system.

In 1832, it was combined with Nairnshire and was added to form Elginshire and Nairnshire, which was in turn reconstituted in 1918 as Moray and Nairn, with the incorporation of the burghs of Elgin, Nairn and Forres which had previously been part of Inverness Burghs and Elgin Burghs.

== Creation ==
The British parliamentary constituency was created in 1708 following the Acts of Union, 1707 and replaced the former Parliament of Scotland shire constituency of Elgin & Forresshire .

== Members of Parliament ==
Year	Member	Party
1708	Robert Urquhart	
1710	Alexander Grant	
1720	James Brodie	
1720	Alexander Brodie	
1741	Sir Ludovick Grant	
1761	James Grant	
1768	Francis Grant	
1774	Arthur Duff	
1779	Lord William Gordon	
1784	James Duff, Earl of Fife	Pittite
1790	Ludovick Grant, later Earl of Seafield	
1796	James Brodie	
1807	Francis Ogilvy-Grant, later Earl of Seafield	Tory
1832	Constituency merged with Nairnshire	
