= James Ogilvy, 6th Earl of Findlater =

Scottish peer

James Ogilvy, 6th Earl of Findlater and 3rd Earl of Seafield (c. 1714 – 3 November 1770) was a Scottish peer.

== Life ==
He was the eldest son of James Ogilvy, 5th Earl of Findlater and 2nd Earl of Seafield, and Lady Elizabeth Hay, second daughter of Thomas Hay, 7th Earl of Kinnoull. He was born about 1714.

While on foreign travel he made the acquaintance of Horace Walpole, who, in a letter to Henry Seymour Conway on 23 April 1740, wrote of him, "There are few young people have so good an understanding," but referred to his 'solemn Scotchery' as not a 'little formidable'. Before succeeding his father in 1764, he was known as Lord Deskford.

From an early period, he took an active interest in promoting manufactures and agriculture. In the parish of Deskford, he opened, in 1752, a large bleachfield, and in Cullen, Moray he established a manufacture for linen and damask. From 1754 to 1761, he was one of the commissioners of customs for Scotland, and in 1765 he was constituted one of the lords of police. He was also a trustee for the improvement of fisheries and manufactures, and for the management of the annexed estates in Scotland. By his example and encouragement he did much to promote advanced methods of agriculture in Banffshire. He introduced turnip husbandry, and granted long leases to his tenants on condition that within a certain period they should endorse their lands, and adopt certain improved methods of cropping. To prevent damage to young plantations on his estate, he agreed to give certain of his tenants, on the termination of their leases, every third tree, or its value in money.

He died at Cullen House on 3 November 1770.

== Family ==
By his wife, Lady Mary, second daughter of John Murray, 1st Duke of Atholl, he had two sons :

- James, seventh earl of Findlater and fourth earl of Seafield (died 1811 in Dresden), the last earl of the Ogilvy line;
- and John (died 1763).

Peerage of Scotland
Preceded by James Ogilvy	Earl of Findlater; Earl of Seafield; 1764–1770	Succeeded by James Ogilvy
