= Sir James Grant, 6th Baronet =

Scottish Whig politician

Sir James Grant, 6th Baronet (28 July 1679 – 16 January 1747) was a Scottish Whig politician who sat in the House of Commons from 1722 to 1747. He was Chief of Clan Grant from 1719 until his death.

== Early life ==
Grant was the third, but second surviving son of Ludovick Grant of Grant. He was educated at Elgin, Moray. He married, on 29 January 1702, Anne Colquhoun, daughter of Sir Humphrey Colquhoun, 5th Baronet, of Luss, Dunbarton. Grant became heir of entail to his father-in-law’s estate and baronetcy by a patent executed in 1704. In 1718, upon succeeding to the baronetcy, he became, Sir James Colquhoun of Luss. In 1719 on the death of his brother Alexander, he succeeded as Clan Chief and to the Grant estates, whereupon he reverted to his family name of Grant, keeping the title of baronet. He passed the Colquhoun inheritance by the entail to his second son Ludovick. On 24 June 1721 he was created Lord Grant in the Jacobite peerage by James Francis Edward Stuart in an attempt by the exiled Old Pretender secure the support of Clan Grant. The Old Pretender's gesture was, of course, in vain.

== Career ==
At the 1722 Grant was returned as Member of Parliament for Inverness-shire on his family’s interest. He consistently voted with the Administration and was returned unopposed again in 1727. His only reported speech was made on 5 May 1732, asking for leniency for a relative, Sir Archibald Grant. He was returned again in 1734. At the 1741 general election, he transferred to Elgin Burghs, continuing to vote with the Government.

He was in Scotland when Charles Edward Stuart landed in Scotland to initiate the Jacobite rising of 1745, but after a meeting with clan members at Castle Grant, he decided to go south to London. Grant advised his son ‘to stay at home, take care of his country and join no party’. He sent two notes to Henry Pelham, suggesting the formation of an army based on clansmen from among the loyal clans, and forwarded an unopened letter from the Young Pretender to Lord Tweeddale, the secretary of state for Scotland.

== Death and legacy ==
Grant died on 16 January 1747. He and his wife had six sons and eight daughters. His eldest son Ludovick was a commissioner of police and succeeded to the baronetcy. His second son was a captain in the army. His fourth, and third, surviving son was Lieutenant-General Francis Grant (1717-1781).

Parliament of Great Britain
Preceded by John Forbes	Member of Parliament for Inverness-shire; 1722 –1741	Succeeded by Norman Macleod
Preceded by William Steuart	Member of Parliament for Elgin Burghs; 1741 –1747	Succeeded by William Grant
Peerage of Scotland
New title	— TITULAR — Lord Grant; Jacobite peerage 1721–1747	Succeeded by Ludovick Grant
Baronetage of Nova Scotia
Preceded by Humphrey Colquhoun	Baronet (of Colquhoun) c. 1718–1747	Succeeded by Ludovick Grant
