= James Ogilvy, 7th Earl of Findlater =

Scottish peer, landscape architect and philanthropist (1750–1811)

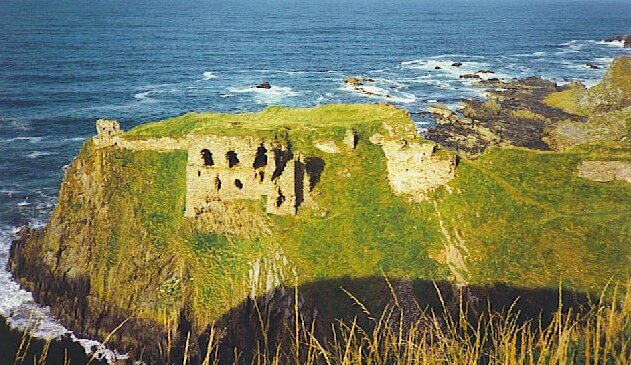
Findlater Castle, ancestral seat of the Earls of Findlater.

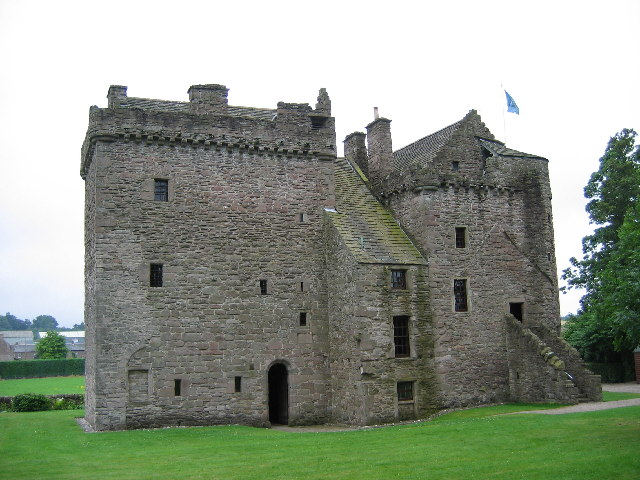
Huntingtower Castle

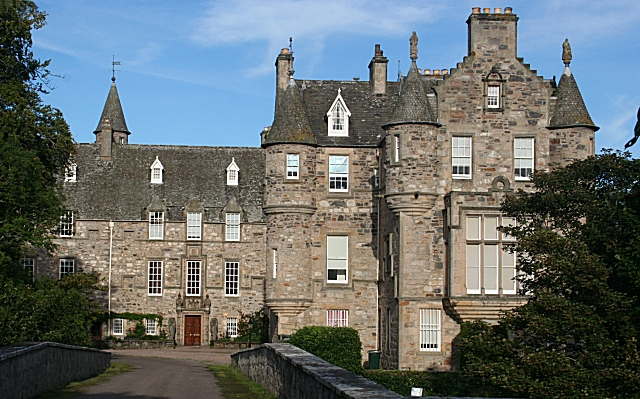
Cullen House, seat of the Earls of Findlater and Seafield and where the young James Ogilvie would have grown up

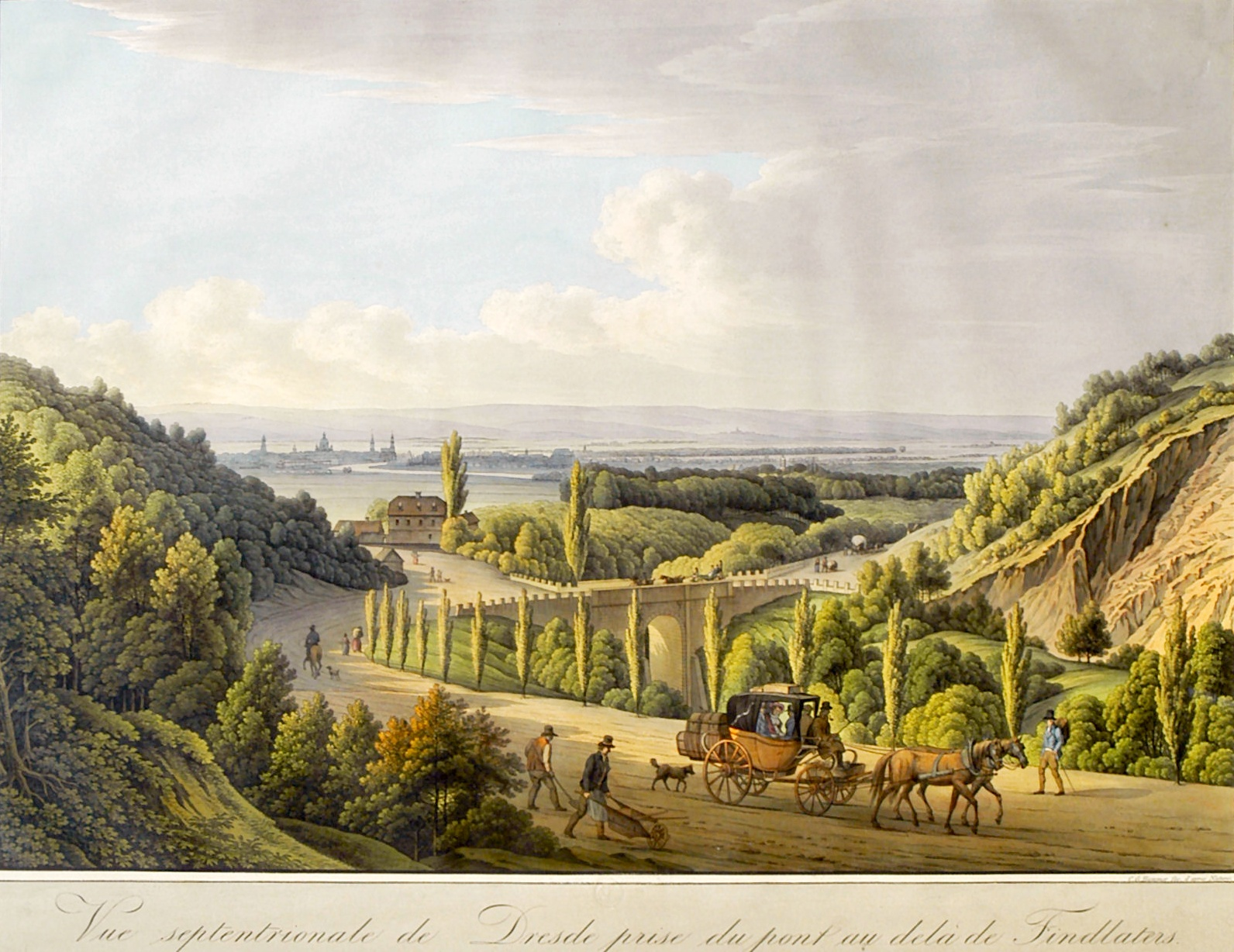
Findlater's vineyard near Dresden, outline etching by Christian Gottlob Hammer, 1805

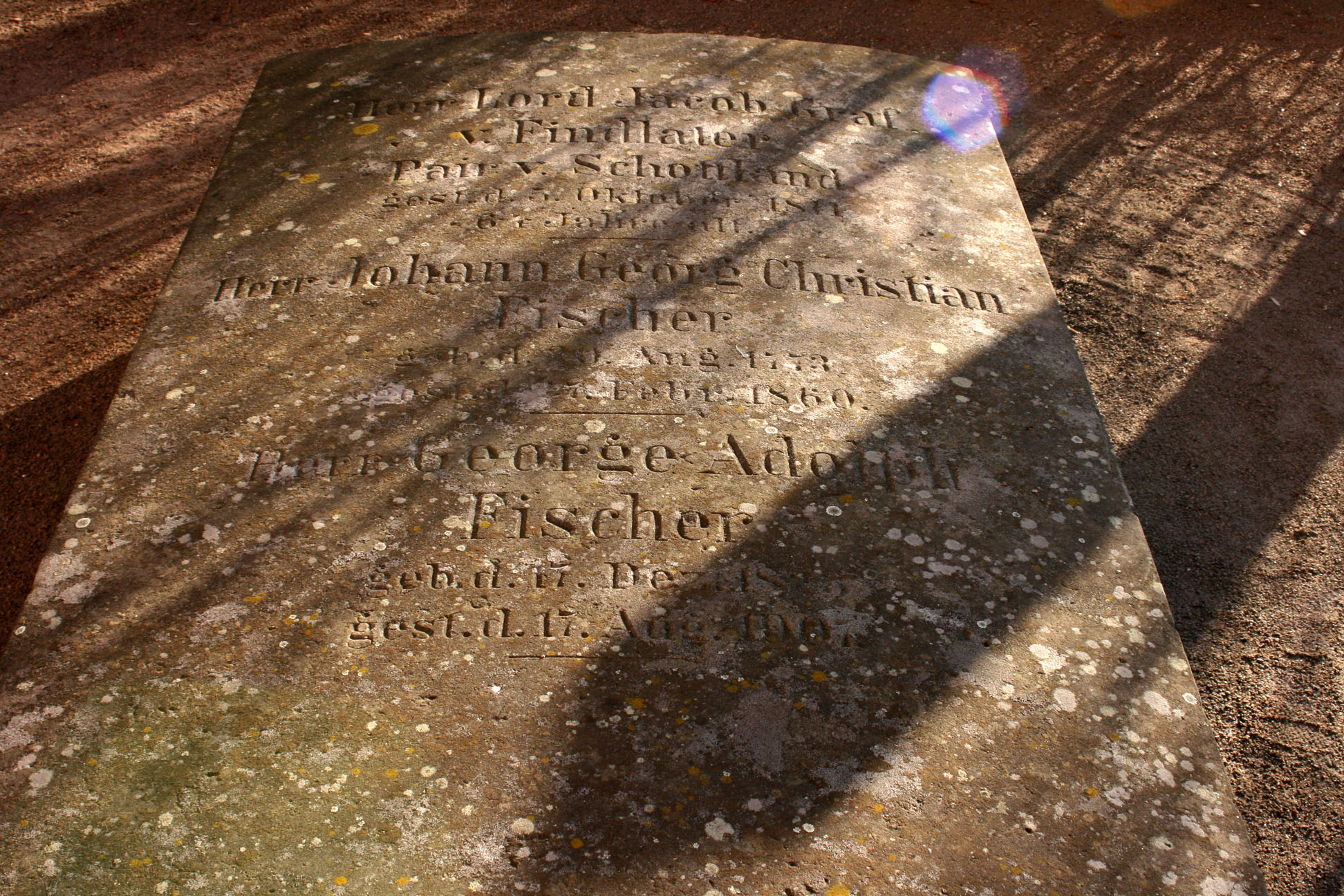
Gravestone for Findlater and Fischer at Loschwitz Church

James Ogilvy, 7th Earl of Findlater and 4th Earl of Seafield (10 April 1750 – 5 October 1811) was a Scottish peer and an accomplished amateur landscape architect and philanthropist. He promoted the British landscape garden in mainland Europe, where he spent lavishly on public works and "improvements of the scenery."

== Early life ==
James Ogilvy was the son of James Ogilvy, 6th Earl of Findlater and 3rd Earl of Seafield (ca. 1714–1770), and Lady Mary Murray (1720–1795), daughter of John Murray, 1st Duke of Atholl. Ogilvy was born at Huntingtower Castle in 1750. His only brother John died in 1763. He inherited the estates and Cullen House in 1770 at the age of twenty after his father, the 6th Earl of Findlater took his own life. Findlater attended Oxford University, then left the British Isles for Brussels in the Austrian Netherlands, where he in 1779 married Christina Teresa Murray with whom he only lived together briefly. Christina Teresa was the daughter of Sir Joseph Murray, Count of Melgum, Baronet of Nova Scotia, and Lieutenant-General in the army of Holy Roman Empire.

== Exile ==
Findlater is often listed amongst those who left Scotland as a result of their homosexual orientation. However, it is not clear as to whether this "exile" was real or self-imposed. In 1791 he apparently made a joke at the expense of the Duchess of Gordon, wife of Alexander Gordon, 4th Duke of Gordon. A ship called the Duchess of Gordon had been recently built with copper sheathing on the hull to deter rot. The Earl of Findlater was overheard to remark "I aye kent the Duchess had a brass neck and a brazen face, but I niver kent she had a copper arse". The Duchess of Gordon was not amused, pursuing the matter in the courts. Findlater fled, never returning to Scotland.

== Cullen ==
Despite his travels, Findlater remained involved in his estates and employed the leading architects. For example, he commissioned Robert Adam to develop plans for a new house at Cullen and James Playfair to redesign the existing house and the adjoining kitchen garden. In 1773, James Boswell and Dr. Samuel Johnson viewed the estate on their journey to the Hebrides and noted that it was "admirably laid out.". Whilst Adam's designs for a new site for the House were not taken up, the suggestion of resiting Cullen from around the church to its present position around the harbour was acted on, although not until some years later.

From 1791, John Ross, a retired professor of Aberdeen University administered his estates at Cullen. Findlater's estates in Scotland (at the time of his death) amounted to about £40,000 per annum (about £4.6 million in 2009 prices.

== Carlsbad ==
From about 1794, Lord Findlater visited Bohemian Carlsbad (Karlovy Vary), to benefit from drinking the spa waters. He became a significant patron of the city and gave large sums of money to local charities and for laying out and improving the environs of the town including paths. Findlaterova stezka (Findlater path) continues to be a well used trail. Within the trails is Findlater's Temple, a classical semi-circular building surrounded by a cupola, erected by Lord Findlater, in gratitude for the benefits be received from the Carlsbad waters. Also nearby is Findlater's Obelisk made of granite, twenty-eight feet in height, erected in 1804 in honour of Lord Findlater, " the friend and beautifier of nature, as a token of the gratitude of the citizens of Carlsbad." The obelisk commands a fine view of the valley below.

== Dresden ==
In 1802, Lord Findlater was commissioned by Countess Henriette of Schall-Riaucour to create a landscape garden in the English style around Gaussig House near Bautzen. In 1803, Findlater's private secretary, Johann Georg Fischer, purchased Helfenberg Manor located in the Dresden Elbe Valley, on behalf of his benefactor. The land included five vineyards including "Findlaters Vineyard" and "Findlaters Sheer Vineyard" near Loschwitz with panoramic views over the river Elbe. The manor had a small park, which was landscaped by Findlater with precious shrubs and trees. On Bredemannschen mountain, where today Schloss Albrechtsberg rises to the sky, Findlater had the master builder Johann August Giesel build him a Neoclassical palace. This building soon gained for itself the title of "The most beautiful family palace in Dresden". The associated Elbe terraces were cultivated with pergolas, ponds and vines.

== Death ==
Findlater died in 1811 and he bequeathed the Dresden property to Fischer who lived at Helfenberg Manor until his own death in 1860. The Scottish heirs protested in court on the ground that the bequests to Fischer had been made for an immoral consideration (i.e. "ob turpem causa"). Also upon his death, the earldom of Findlater became dormant. The title of Earl of Seafield passed to his cousin Sir Ludovick Alexander Grant (1767–1840) who also took the surname Ogilvy. Findlater is buried at the Loschwitz parish church. The gravestone includes both Findlater and his partner Johann Georg Christian Fischer (1773–1860).

== See also ==
- Restored Findlater Temple (in Czech)
- Photograph of Findlater Temple
- Drawing of Findlater Temple in 1810
- Findlater Obelisk (in Czech)

Peerage of Scotland
Preceded by James Ogilvy	Earl of Findlater; 1770–1811	Dormant
Preceded by James Ogilvy	Earl of Seafield; 1770–1811	Succeeded by Ludovick Ogilvy-Grant
