= Sir John Colquhoun, 1st Baronet =

Sir John Colquhoun
- Born: c. 1596
- Known for: Baronet

Sir John Colquhoun (c.1596 – aft. 8 November 1647), Sixteenth Lord Colquhoun and the Eighteenth of Luss, was the first Colquhoun baronet of Nova Scotia, Canada. The Baronetage of the Colquhoun clan of Nova Scotia was established on 30 August 1625.

Colquhoun was born in Scotland, probably in 1596, as his parents were married in 1595. He was the eldest son of Sir Alexander Colquhoun and Lady Helen Buchanan.

In 1620, he married Lady Lilias Graham, eldest daughter of John Graham, Fourth Earl of Montrose, and elder sister of the Great Montrose, which was what her younger brother, James Graham, 5th Earl of Montrose, came to be known, in addition to being the Marquis of Montrose. In 1632 Sir John was accused of absconding his wife's sister, Lady Catherine Graham. It was alleged that he had used witchcraft and sorcery to accomplish this. As a fugitive he was excommunicated and his estates forfeited.

When and where John died is unknown. He was alive on 8 November 1647.

== Footnotes ==
Baronetage of Nova Scotia
New creation	Baronet (of Colquhoun); 1625–1647	Succeeded by John Colquhoun
