= Lewis Ogilvie-Grant, 5th Earl of Seafield =

Scottish Earl

The Right Honourable The Earl of Seafield FRSE

Member of Parliament for Elginshire
- In office 1790–1796
- Preceded by: The Earl Fife
- Succeeded by: James Brodie

Personal details
- Born: Lewis Alexander Grant; 22 March 1767; Moy, Inverness-shire, Scotland
- Died: 26 October 1840 (aged 73); Cullen House, Moray, Scotland
- Relations: Francis Ogilvy-Grant, 6th Earl of Seafield (brother)
- Parent(s): Sir James Grant, 8th Baronet; Jean Duff
- Education: Edinburgh High School; Westminster School
- Alma mater: University of Edinburgh

Lewis Alexander Grant-Ogilvie, 5th Earl of Seafield, FRSE (22 March 1767 – 26 October 1840) was a Scottish nobleman. He is numbered as the 24th Chief of Clan Grant. His promising career was cut short by mental instability.

== Life ==
He was born Lewis Alexander Grant at Moy near Inverness, the son of Sir James Grant, 8th Baronet and Jean Duff (1746–1805). He was christened at Dyke a few days later.

He was educated at Edinburgh High School and Westminster School, then studied law at the University of Edinburgh and Lincoln's Inn in London.

== Career ==
In 1788 he was elected a Fellow of the Royal Society of Edinburgh. His proposers were Dugald Stewart, James Gregory, and Andrew Dalzell.

He was elected to the House of Commons for Elginshire in 1790, a seat he held until 1796. From 1791 his health began to fail and by 1805 he was described as being a "most hopeless case of mental derangement". In 1794 he was diagnosed as incurable but did not surrender his seat as an MP until 1796.

In February 1811 he succeeded his father as ninth Baronet of Colquhoun. Eight months later, in October 1811, he became the fifth Earl of Seafield on the death of his second cousin James Ogilvie, 7th Earl of Findlater and 4th Earl of Seafield. Seafield was the grandson of Lady Margaret Ogilvie, daughter of the prominent statesman James Ogilvie, 4th Earl of Findlater and 1st Earl of Seafield. However, he was not in remainder to the earldom of Findlater which title became extinct. He assumed the additional surname of Ogilvie on succeeding in the earldom.

== Personal life ==
Lord Seafield never married. He died at Cullen House in Banffshire on 26 October 1840, aged 73, and was buried in the Mausoleum in Duthil Old Parish Church and Churchyard. He was succeeded by his younger brother Francis William Ogilvie-Grant who had already taken over all practical duties and curatorship of the estates from the point of Alexander's mental instability.

His uncles included Henry Mackenzie and Alexander Penrose Cumming-Gordon.

== Notes ==
Parliament of Great Britain
Preceded by The Earl Fife	Member of Parliament for Elginshire; 1790–1796	Succeeded by James Brodie
Peerage of Scotland
Preceded by James Ogilvy	Earl of Seafield; 1811–1840	Succeeded by Francis William Ogilvy-Grant
Baronetage of Nova Scotia
Preceded by James Grant	Baronet (of Colquhoun); 1811–1840	Succeeded by Francis William Ogilvie-Grant
