= James Ogilvy, 4th Earl of Findlater =

Scottish politician (1664–1730)

The Right Honourable The Earl of Findlater KT PC
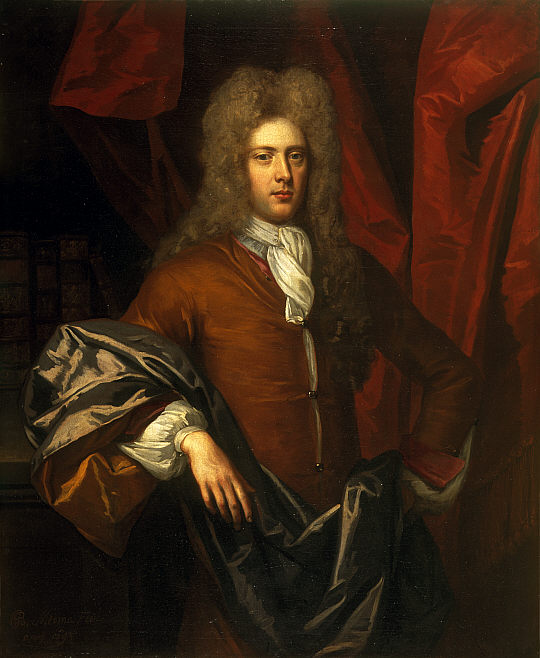
- James Ogilvy, 4th Earl of Findlater.

Keeper of the Great Seal of Scotland
- In office 1713–1714
- Monarch: Queen Anne
- Preceded by: The Marquess of Tweeddale
- Succeeded by: The Earl of Seafield

Lord Chancellor of Scotland
- In office 1702–1708
- Monarch: Queen Anne
- Preceded by: The Earl of Marchmont

Lord High Commissioner to the General Assembly of the Church of Scotland
- In office 1703–1704
- Monarch: Queen Anne
- Preceded by: The Earl of Marchmont
- Succeeded by: The Lord Ross

Personal details
- Born: 11 July 1664
- Died: 19 August 1730 (aged 66)
- Spouse: Anne Dunbar
- Children: 4, including James
- Parent(s): James Ogilvy, 3rd Earl of Findlater; Lady Anne Montgomerie

James Ogilvy, 4th Earl of Findlater and 1st Earl of Seafield, KT, PC (11 July 1664 – 19 August 1730) was a Scottish politician, prominent during the reign of Queen Anne. He was created Earl of Seafield in 1701 and was an active supporter of the 1707 Act of Union although by 1714 his opinion of the Union had changed and he proposed the first Self Government for Scotland Bill to end the Union.

== Early life ==
Findlater was born on 11 July 1664, the second son of James Ogilvy, 3rd Earl of Findlater, of Clan Ogilvy, and Lady Anne Montgomerie, a daughter of Hugh Montgomerie, 7th Earl of Eglinton.

== Career ==
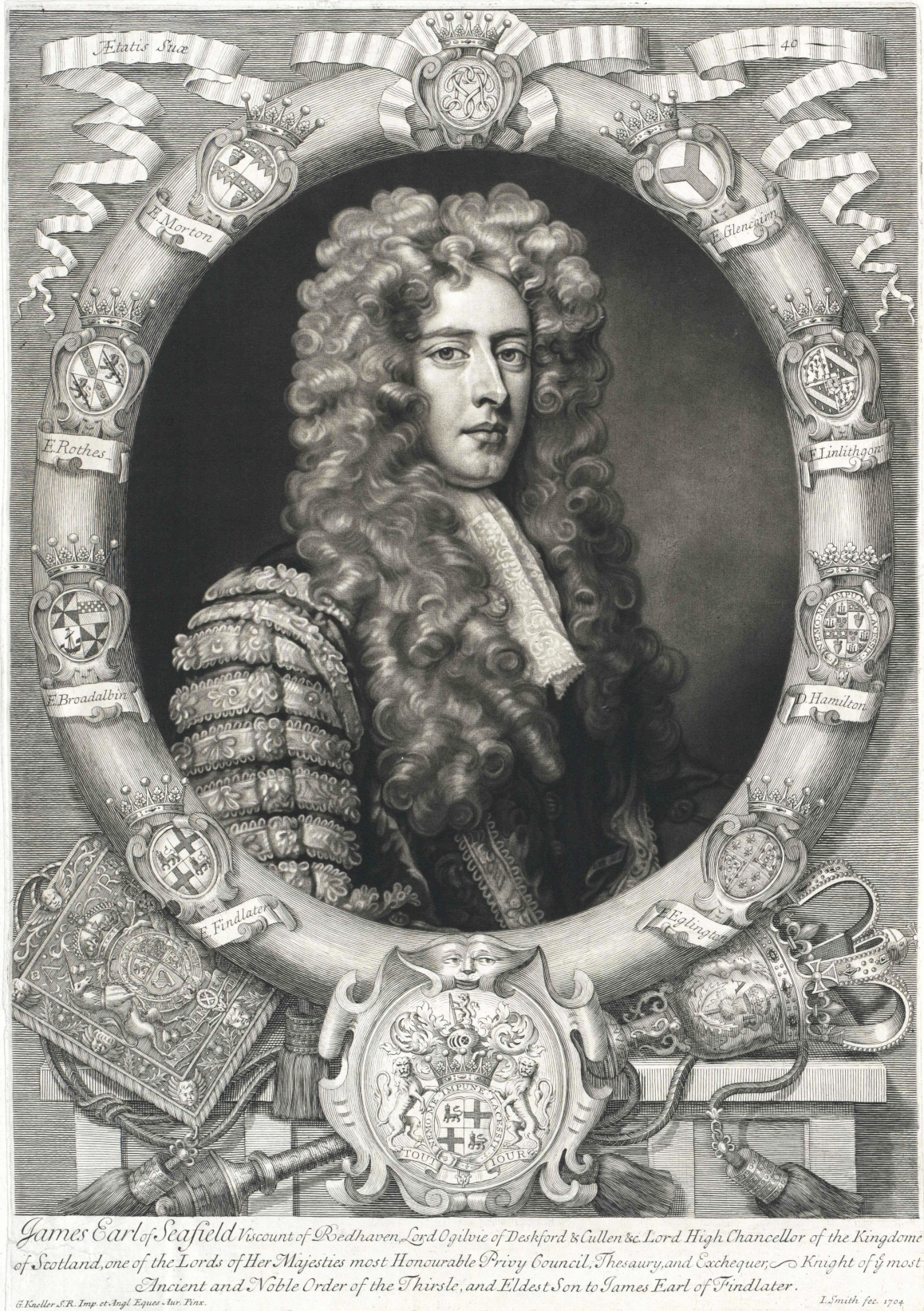
The Earl of Findlater in the robes of the Lord Chief Baron.

He was elected to the Faculty of Advocates in 1685, and was a Commissioner to the Parliament of Scotland for Cullen, Banffshire from 1681 to 1682 and from 1689 to 1695. Although in the Convention Parliament of 1689 he had spoken for James VII, he took the oath of allegiance to William and Mary, and after filling some minor official positions he was appointed to senior roles. Upon his royal appointment as Secretary of State in 1696 he relinquished his representation of Cullen and continued in parliament instead by right of his office. Findlater was Solicitor General for Scotland from 1693, Lord Chancellor of Scotland from 1702 to 1704 and from 1705 to 1708, Secretary of State from 1696 to 1702 and joint secretary from 1704 to 1705. He was elected a Fellow of the Royal Society in 1698.

Findlater was created Viscount Seafield in 1698 and Earl of Seafield in 1701. He was a Commissioner for the Union from 1702 and an active promoter of the Union from 1706. He served as first Lord Chief Baron of the Scottish Court of Exchequer, established by the Act of Union. By 1713, his views on Union had changed and he moved for its repeal.

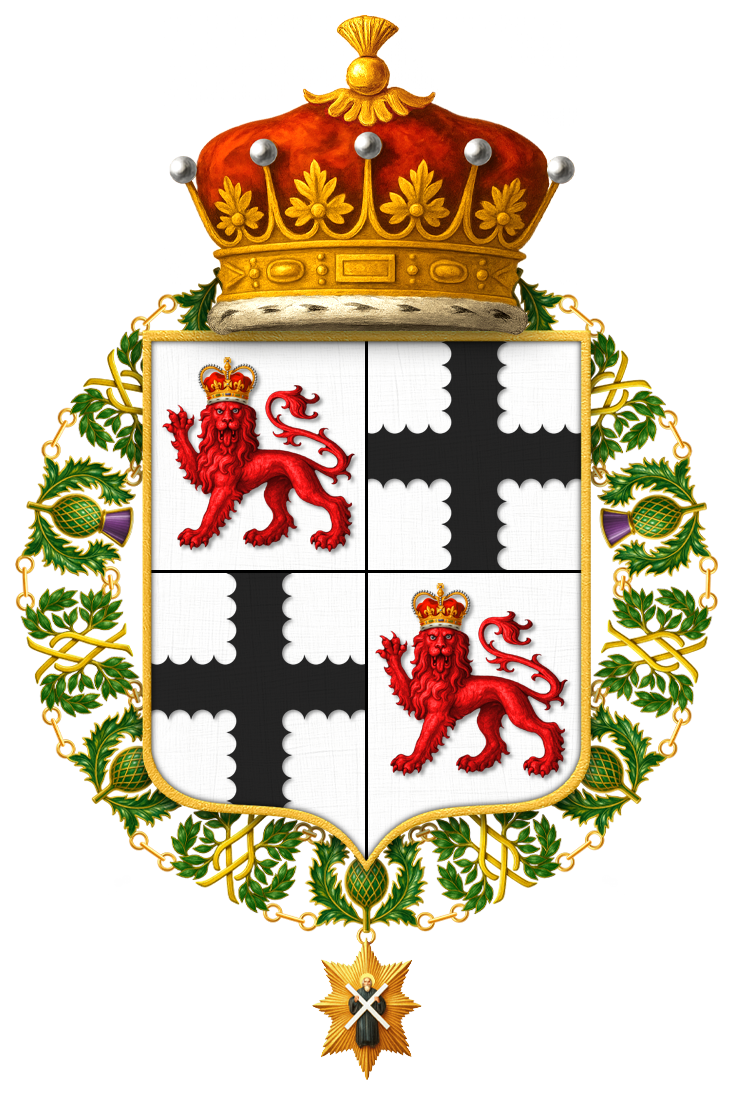
Shield of arms of James Ogilvy, 4th Earl of Findlater and 1st Earl of Seafield, surmounting the collar of the Order of the Thistle

He sat in the House of Lords as a Scottish representative peer from 1707 to 1710, from 1712 to 1715 and from 1722 to 1730. Findlater was admitted to the Privy Council of Great Britain in 1707 and was appointed Lord Chief Baron in the Court of Exchequer in 1707. In 1711, he succeeded his father as fourth Earl of Findlater. He served as Keeper of the Great Seal of Scotland from 1713 to 1714.

== Personal life ==
In 1687, Lord Seafield married Anne Dunbar, daughter of Sir William Dunbar, 1st Baronet. They had the following issue:

- James Ogilvy, 5th Earl of Findlater and 2nd Earl of Seafield (1689–1764), who succeeded his father.
- Hon. George Ogilvy (1690–1732), who died unmarried.
- Lady Elizabeth Ogilvy (1692–1778), who married Charles Maitland, 6th Earl of Lauderdale, and had issue.
- Lady Janet Ogilvy (1695–1720), who married Hugh Forbes of Craigievar, without issue. After his death, she married William Duff, 1st Earl Fife.

Lord Findlater died in August 1730, aged 66, and was succeeded by his son James Ogilvy, 5th Earl of Findlater and 2nd Earl of Seafield.

Political offices
Preceded by The Earl of Marchmont	Lord Chancellor of Scotland; 1702–1704	Succeeded by The Marquess of Tweeddale
Preceded by The Marquess of Tweeddale	Lord Chancellor of Scotland; 1705–1708	In abeyance
Preceded by Hugh Campbell	Keeper of the Great Seal of Scotland; 1713–1714	Succeeded by William Johnstone
Peerage of Scotland
Preceded by James Ogilvy	Earl of Findlater; 1711–1730	Succeeded by James Ogilvy
New creation	Earl of Seafield; 1701–1730	Succeeded by James Ogilvy
New creation	Viscount of Seafield; 1698–1730	Succeeded by James Ogilvy
