= Earl of Seafield =

Title in the peerage of Scotland

Earldom of Seafield
- Blazon Arms: Grandquarterly 1st and 4th counterquarterly Ist and IVth Argent a lion passant guardant Gules crowned with an imperial crown and collared with an open crown Proper (Ogilvie); IInd and IIIrd Argent a cross engrailed Sable (Sinclair of Deskford); 2nd and 3rd Gules three celestial crowns Or (Grant).
- Creation date: 1701
- Created by: William III and II
- Peerage: Peerage of Scotland
- First holder: James Ogilvy, 4th Earl of Findlater
- Present holder: Ian Ogilvie-Grant, 13th Earl of Seafield
- Heir apparent: James Ogilvie-Grant, Viscount Reidhaven
- Subsidiary titles: Viscount of Reidhaven; Viscount of Seafield; Lord Ogilvy of Deskford and Cullen; Lord Ogilvy of Cullen
- Seat: Cullen House (Old Cullen)

Earl of Seafield is a title in the Peerage of Scotland. It was created in 1701 for James Ogilvie, who in 1711 succeeded his father as 4th Earl of Findlater. The earldoms of Findlater and Seafield continued to be united until 1811, when the earldom of Findlater became dormant, while the earldom of Seafield remains extant.

== History ==
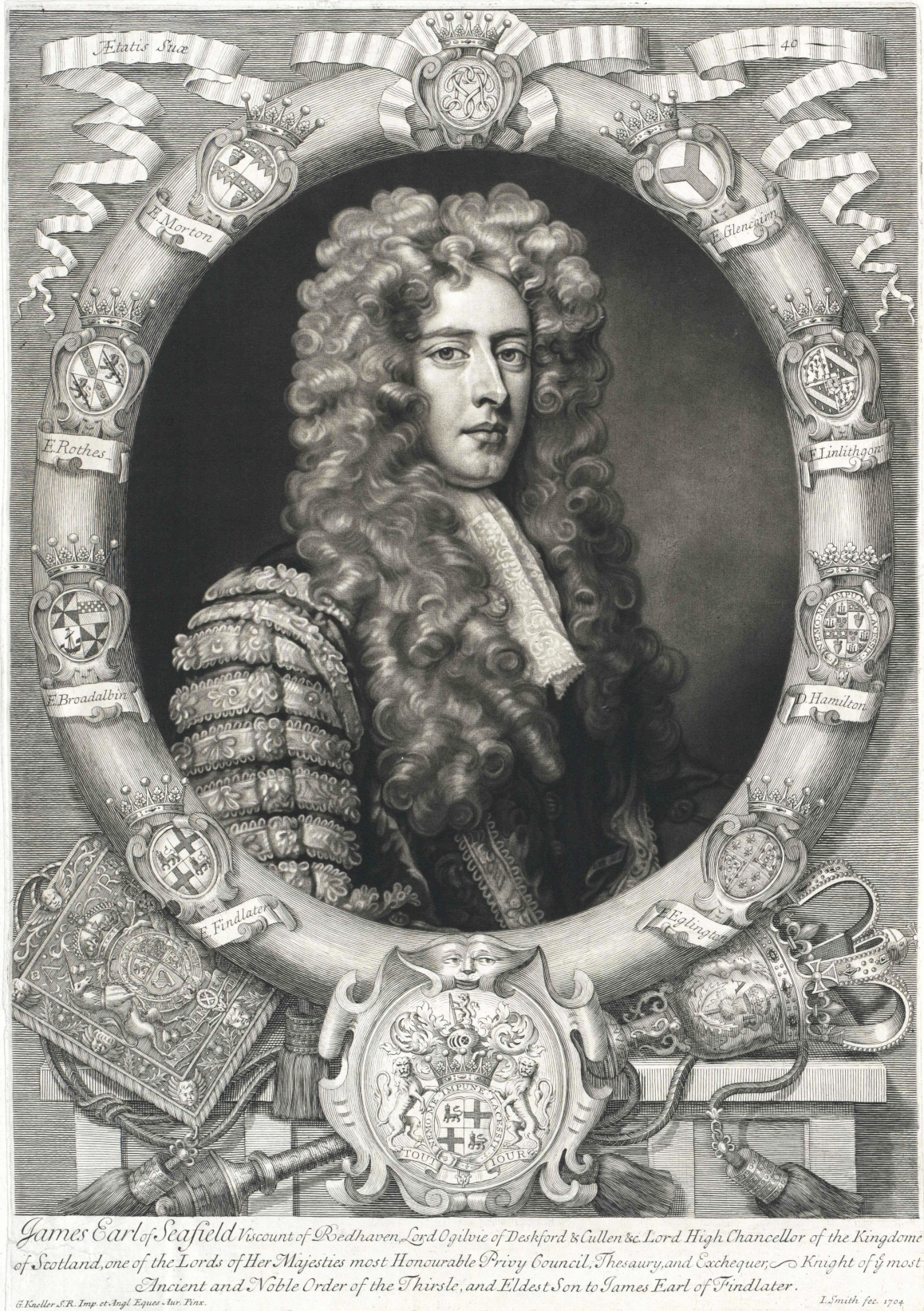
James Ogilvie, 4th Earl of Findlater and 1st Earl of Seafield, Lord Chief Baron of Scotland

The first Earl of Seafield's branch of the Ogilvie family descended from Sir Walter Ogilvie, whose brother Sir John Ogilvy was the ancestor of the Earls of Airlie.

In 1616, the aforementioned Sir Walter Ogilvie's descendant and namesake, Sir Walter Ogilvie, was created Lord Ogilvie of Deskford in the Peerage of Scotland. His son, the second Lord, was created Earl of Findlater in the Peerage of Scotland in 1638. Three years later, in 1641, Lord Findlater obtained a new patent with remainder to his daughter Elizabeth and her husband Sir Patrick Ogilvie. Upon his death in 1653, the first Earl of Findlater was succeeded by his son-in-law Sir Patrick while Elizabeth was granted the style and title of Countess of Findlater as though she held the title in her own right.

In the late 17th century, James Ogilvie, eldest son of the third Earl of Findlater, was a prominent statesman and served as Secretary of State for Scotland, as President of the Scottish Parliament, as Lord High Commissioner to the General Assembly of the Church of Scotland, as Lord Chancellor of Scotland, as Lord Chief Baron of the Court of the Exchequer in Scotland and as a Scottish representative peer. In 1698, thirteen years before he succeeded his father, he was raised to the Peerage of Scotland in his own right as Lord Ogilvie of Cullen and Viscount of Seafield, with remainder, failing heirs male of the body, to heirs of entail. In 1701, he was further honoured when he was created Lord Ogilvie of Deskford and Cullen, Viscount of Reidhaven and Earl of Seafield, also in the Peerage of Scotland and with the same remainder. In 1711, he succeeded his father as fourth Earl of Findlater.

The earldoms of Findlater and Seafield remained united for the next hundred years. However, on the death of his great-grandson, the seventh and fourth Earl respectively, the lordship of Ogilvie and Deskford and the earldom of Findlater became dormant. The earldom of Seafield and its subsidiary titles were inherited by the late Earl's second cousin Sir Lewis Alexander Grant, 9th Baronet, of Colquhoun (see Colquhoun baronets for earlier history of the Grant family). He was a grandson of Lady Margaret Ogilvie, daughter of the fifth Earl of Findlater and second Earl of Seafield. On his succession to the earldom, he assumed the additional surname of Ogilvie, styling himself Grant-Ogilvie.

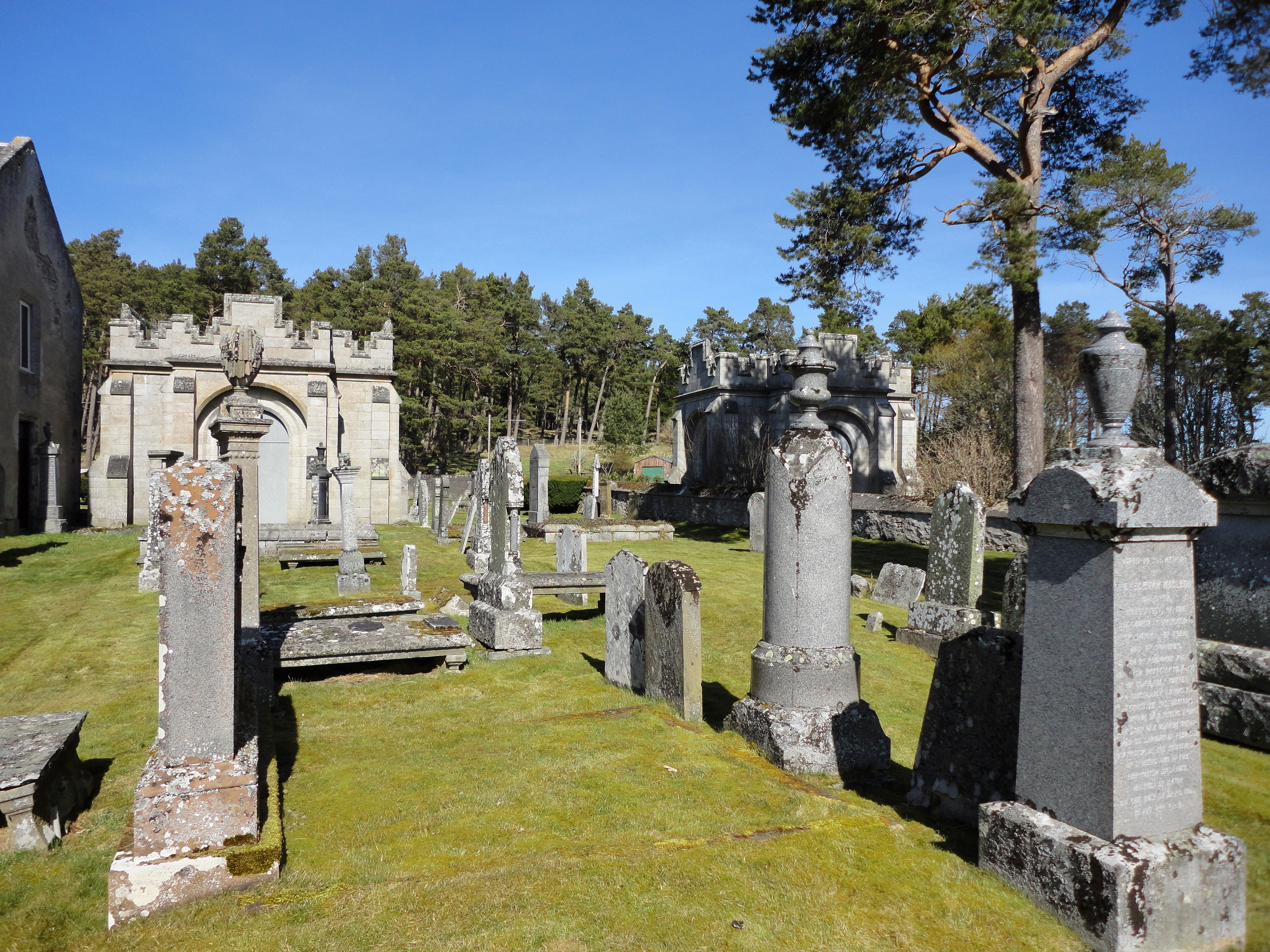
Grant mausolea at Duthil Old Parish Church and Churchyard

After the fifth Earl of Seafield's death in 1840, his younger brother and successor, the sixth Earl, reversed the order of the surnames, styling himself Ogilvie-Grant. In 1858, the latter's son, the seventh Earl, was created Baron Strathspey, of Strathspey in the Counties of Inverness and Moray, in the Peerage of the United Kingdom. The barony became extinct on the death of his son, the eighth Earl, in 1884, while the Scottish titles were passed on to the Earl's uncle, the ninth Earl. The barony of Strathspey was revived for him only a few months after he succeeded his nephew.

On the death of the eleventh Earl of Seafield in 1915, the baronetcy and barony of Strathspey separated from the earldom. The baronetcy and barony, which only could be passed on to male heirs, were inherited by the late Earl's younger brother, the fourth Baron (see the Baron Strathspey for later history of these titles). The earldom and the other subsidiary titles, which could be inherited by females, were passed on to the Earl's daughter and only child, the twelfth Countess. As of 2017, the titles are held by her only son, the thirteenth Earl, who succeeded in 1969.

The family seat is Cullen House, near Cullen, Moray. The family also owns estates at Strathspey. Many Earls of Seafield are buried at the mausoleum at Duthil Old Parish Church and Churchyard, which lies just outside the village of Duthil, Inverness-shire, and now serves as a Clan Grant Centre. The 11th Earl was killed in action in 1915 and is buried at Lijssenthoek Military Cemetery in Belgium.

The Seafield family possess an 84,500-acre estate, making them one of the principal landowners in Scotland.

== List of title holders ==
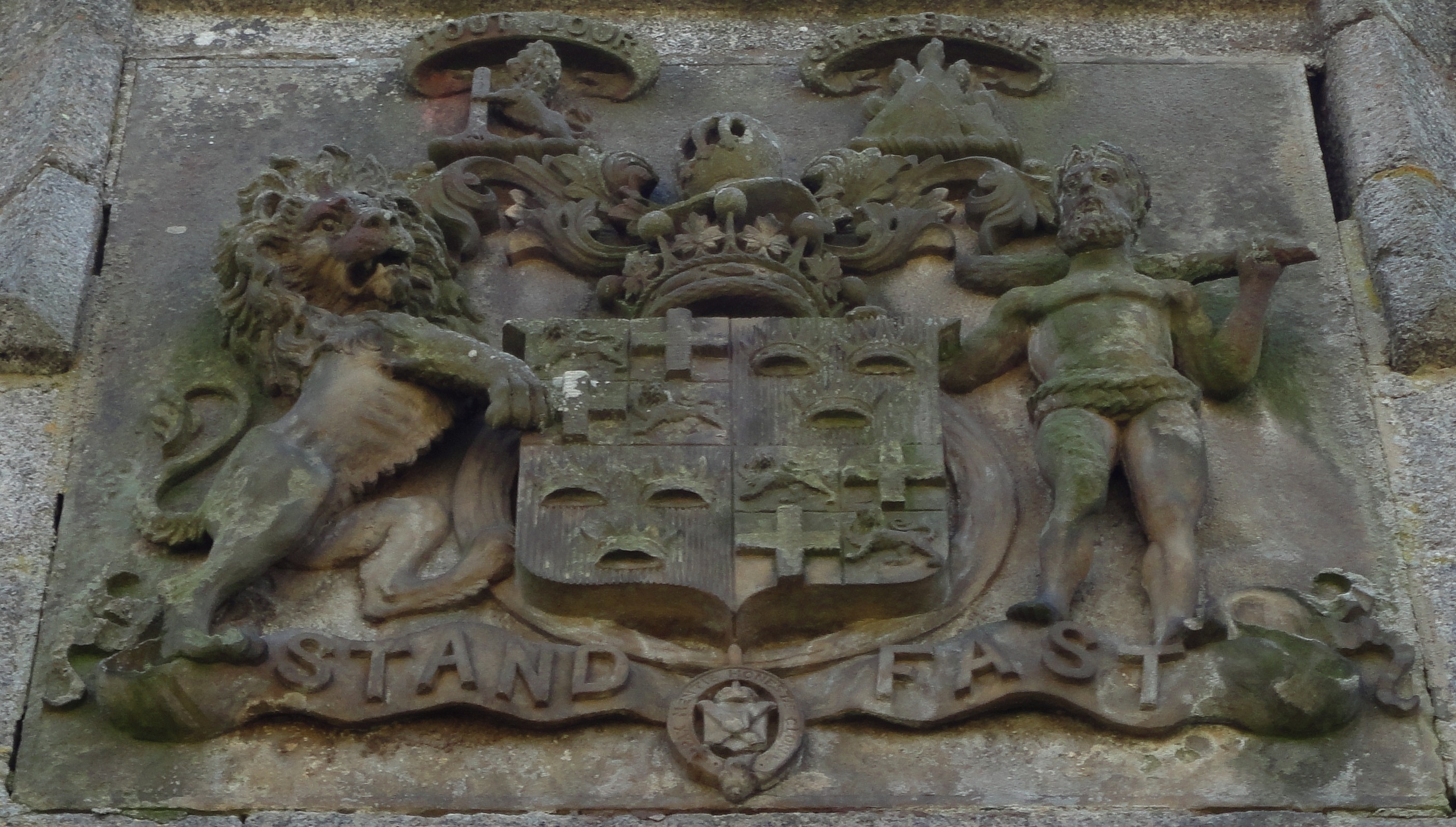
Arms of the Earl of Seafield at the Grant Mausoleum, Duthil

=== Lords Ogilvie of Deskford (1616) ===
- Walter Ogilvie, 1st Lord Ogilvie of Deskford (died 1626)
- James Ogilvie, 2nd Lord Ogilvie of Deskford (died 1653) (created Earl of Findlater in 1638)

=== Earls of Findlater (1638/1641) and Seafield (1701) ===
- James Ogilvie, 1st Earl of Findlater (died 1653)
- Patrick Ogilvie, 2nd Earl of Findlater (died 1658)
- James Ogilvie, 3rd Earl of Findlater (died 1711)
- James Ogilvie, 4th Earl of Findlater (1663–1730) (created Earl of Seafield in 1701)
- James Ogilvie, 5th Earl of Findlater, 2nd Earl of Seafield (died 1764)
- James Ogilvie, 6th Earl of Findlater, 3rd Earl of Seafield (died 1770)
- James Ogilvie, 7th Earl of Findlater, 4th Earl of Seafield (1750–1811) (earldom of Findlater dormant)

=== Earls of Seafield (1701) ===
- Lewis Alexander Grant-Ogilvie, 5th Earl of Seafield (1767–1840)
- Francis William Ogilvie-Grant, 6th Earl of Seafield (1778–1853)
- John Charles Ogilvie-Grant, 7th Earl of Seafield (1815–1881)
- Ian Charles Ogilvie-Grant, 8th Earl of Seafield (1851–1884)
- James Ogilvie-Grant, 9th Earl of Seafield (1817–1888)
- Francis William Ogilvie-Grant, 10th Earl of Seafield (1847–1888)
- James Ogilvie-Grant, 11th Earl of Seafield (1876–1915)
- Nina Caroline Ogilvie-Grant, 12th Countess of Seafield (1906–1969)
- Ian Derek Francis Ogilvie-Grant, 13th Earl of Seafield (born 1939)

The heir apparent is the present holder's son James Andrew Ogilvie-Grant, Viscount Reidhaven (born 1963).

== See also ==
- Baron Strathspey
- Clan Ogilvie
