= List of listed buildings in Cullen, Moray =

This is a list of listed buildings in the parish of Cullen in Moray, Scotland.

== List ==
Name	Location	Date listed	Geo-coordinates	Notes	Category	LB number	Image
155 Seatown			57°41′31″N 2°49′36″W		C(S)	23899	Upload Photo
198 Seatown			57°41′32″N 2°49′42″W		B	23924	Upload Photo
202 Seatown			57°41′32″N 2°49′41″W		C(S)	23927	Upload Photo
230 Seatown			57°41′32″N 2°49′28″W		B	23947	Upload Photo
235 Seatown			57°41′32″N 2°49′26″W		C(S)	23951	Upload Photo
18, 20 Seafield Street			57°41′26″N 2°49′06″W		C(S)	23760	Upload Photo
44, 46 Seafield Street			57°41′29″N 2°49′13″W		C(S)	23765	Upload Photo
26 South Deskford Street, Lawtie's Mortification			57°41′22″N 2°49′15″W		B	23777	Upload Photo
2, 4 The Square, Clydesdale Bank			57°41′27″N 2°49′12″W		B	23782	Upload Photo
22, 24 The Square			57°41′30″N 2°49′09″W		B	23784	Upload Photo
Seatown, Cullen Harbour And Harbour Light			57°41′39″N 2°49′26″W		B	23803	Upload Photo
3 Seatown (Castle Terrace)			57°41′29″N 2°49′30″W		C(S)	23805	Upload Photo
14, 15 Seatown (Castle Terrace)			57°41′29″N 2°49′34″W		C(S)	23809	Upload Photo
18, 20 Seatown (Castle Terrace)			57°41′29″N 2°49′35″W		C(S)	23810	Upload Photo
36, 37 Seatown			57°41′29″N 2°49′29″W		B	23819	Upload Photo
58 And A Half Seatown			57°41′32″N 2°49′43″W		C(S)	23826	Upload Photo
69 Seatown			57°41′31″N 2°49′39″W		B	23834	Upload Photo
76 Seatown			57°41′30″N 2°49′36″W		C(S)	23839	Upload Photo
85, 87 Seatown			57°41′30″N 2°49′31″W		C(S)	23847	Upload Photo
86 Seatown			57°41′26″N 2°49′32″W		C(S)	23848	Upload Photo
90 Seatown			57°41′30″N 2°49′29″W		C(S)	23851	Upload Photo
97 Seatown			57°41′30″N 2°49′30″W		C(S)	23857	Upload Photo
100 Seatown			57°41′30″N 2°49′30″W		C(S)	23859	Upload Photo
101, 102 Seatown			57°41′30″N 2°49′29″W		C(S)	23860	Upload Photo
111 Seatown (With Former No 108 Seatown)			57°41′30″N 2°49′26″W		C(S)	23866	Upload Photo
115 Seatown And Store			57°41′31″N 2°49′24″W		C(S)	23868	Upload Photo
119, 120 Seatown			57°41′32″N 2°49′23″W		C(S)	23871	Upload Photo
129 Seatown			57°41′32″N 2°49′25″W		B	23881	Upload Photo
2, 4 Grant Street			57°41′24″N 2°49′18″W		B	23716	Upload Photo
3 Seafield Place, Church Of Scotland Manse And Garden Walls			57°41′23″N 2°49′06″W		B	23734	Upload Photo
27, 29 Seafield Street			57°41′30″N 2°49′12″W		C(S)	23745	Upload Photo
49, 51 Seafield Street			57°41′32″N 2°49′17″W		C(S)	23751	Upload Photo
55 Seafield Street			57°41′33″N 2°49′19″W		B	23753	Upload Photo
Cullen House, Main Entrance, Gates And Gate Lodges			57°40′52″N 2°49′29″W		A	2227	Upload Photo
Cullen House, Old Laundry			57°41′02″N 2°49′49″W		B	2228	Upload Photo
148 Seatown			57°41′31″N 2°49′32″W		C(S)	23895	Upload Photo
158 Seatown			57°41′31″N 2°49′34″W		C(S)	23902	Upload Photo
165 Seatown			57°41′31″N 2°49′29″W		C(S)	23905	Upload Photo
178 Seatown			57°41′32″N 2°49′34″W		B	23914	Upload Photo
194 Seatown			57°41′32″N 2°49′39″W		C(S)	23920	Upload Photo
195 Seatown			57°41′32″N 2°49′40″W		C(S)	23921	Upload Photo
214 Seatown			57°41′32″N 2°49′36″W		C(S)	23935	Upload Photo
228 Seatown			57°41′32″N 2°49′29″W		B	23945	Upload Photo
229 Seatown			57°41′32″N 2°49′29″W		C(S)	23946	Upload Photo
28, 30 Seafield Street			57°41′27″N 2°49′08″W		B	23761	Upload Photo
38, 40 Seafield Street			57°41′29″N 2°49′12″W		C(S)	23764	Upload Photo
13 South Castle Street, Kilcoy			57°41′24″N 2°49′11″W		C(S)	23770	Upload Photo
5 Victoria Street			57°41′31″N 2°48′55″W		C(S)	23786	Upload Photo
15 Victoria Street			57°41′32″N 2°48′58″W		C(S)	23789	Upload Photo
2, 4 Victoria Street			57°41′31″N 2°48′53″W		C(S)	23794	Upload Photo
6 Victoria Street			57°41′31″N 2°48′54″W		C(S)	23795	Upload Photo
10, 12 Victoria Street			57°41′32″N 2°48′56″W		C(S)	23796	Upload Photo
16 Victoria Street			57°41′33″N 2°48′58″W		C(S)	23798	Upload Photo
Seatown, Bridge Over Burn Of Cullen			57°41′31″N 2°49′48″W		C(S)	23801	Upload Photo
Seatown, Viaduct Over Burn Of Cullen			57°41′31″N 2°49′48″W		B	23802	Upload another image
9, 12 Seatown (Castle Terrace)			57°41′29″N 2°49′33″W		C(S)	23808	Upload Photo
21, 22, 23, 24 Seatown (Castle Terrace)			57°41′29″N 2°49′37″W		C(S)	23811	Upload Photo
26, 27 Seatown (Castle Terrace)			57°41′30″N 2°49′38″W		C(S)	23813	Upload Photo
38, 39 Seatown			57°41′30″N 2°49′26″W		B	23820	Upload Photo
70 Seatown			57°41′31″N 2°49′38″W		B	23835	Upload Photo
118 Seatown			57°41′31″N 2°49′22″W		C(S)	23870	Upload Photo
122 Seatown			57°41′32″N 2°49′24″W		C(S)	23873	Upload Photo
139 Seatown			57°41′31″N 2°49′30″W		C(S)	23890	Upload Photo
26, 28 Grant Street			57°41′27″N 2°49′12″W		C(S)	23718	Upload Photo
12 North Castle Street			57°41′26″N 2°49′18″W		B	23724	Upload Photo
18, 20 North Castle Street			57°41′27″N 2°49′19″W		B	23727	Upload Photo
5, 7 Seafield Street			57°41′26″N 2°49′03″W		C(S)	23740	Upload Photo
9, 11 Seafield Street			57°41′26″N 2°49′04″W		C(S)	23741	Upload Photo
Seafield Street, Former Seafield Church Of Scotland (Former Free Church)			57°41′27″N 2°49′04″W		C(S)	23742	Upload another image
37 Seafield Street			57°41′31″N 2°49′15″W		B	23747	Upload Photo
57 Seafield Street, Bay View Hotel			57°41′33″N 2°49′19″W		C(S)	23754	Upload Photo
2, 4, 6 Seafield Street			57°41′25″N 2°49′04″W		B	23756	Upload Photo
Cullen House			57°41′02″N 2°49′45″W		A	2219	Upload another image
Cullen House, Iron Bridge Over The Burn Of Cullen (Near Sawmill)			57°40′43″N 2°49′27″W		B	2221	Upload Photo
162 Seatown			57°41′31″N 2°49′30″W		C(S)	23904	Upload Photo
172 Seatown			57°41′32″N 2°49′32″W		C(S)	23910	Upload Photo
181 Seatown			57°41′32″N 2°49′34″W		C(S)	23915	Upload Photo
197 Seatown			57°41′32″N 2°49′41″W		C(S)	23923	Upload Photo
201, 201A Seatown			57°41′33″N 2°49′41″W		C(S)	23926	Upload Photo
209, 210 Seatown			57°41′32″N 2°49′37″W		C(S)	23932	Upload Photo
224 Seatown			57°41′32″N 2°49′30″W		C(S)	23943	Upload Photo
240 Seatown			57°41′33″N 2°49′26″W		C(S)	23955	Upload Photo
1, 3 The Square			57°41′27″N 2°49′11″W		B	23781	Upload Photo
53 Seatown			57°41′32″N 2°49′44″W		C(S)	23823	Upload Photo
63 Seatown			57°41′31″N 2°49′40″W		C(S)	23830	Upload Photo
75 Seatown			57°41′31″N 2°49′36″W		C(S)	23838	Upload Photo
77 Seatown			57°41′30″N 2°49′35″W		C(S)	23840	Upload Photo
78 Seatown			57°41′30″N 2°49′35″W		C(S)	23841	Upload Photo
81 Seatown			57°41′30″N 2°49′33″W		C(S)	23844	Upload Photo
88 Seatown			57°41′30″N 2°49′30″W		B	23849	Upload Photo
105 Seatown			57°41′31″N 2°49′28″W		C(S)	23863	Upload Photo
132 Seatown			57°41′31″N 2°49′27″W		C(S)	23884	Upload Photo
136 Seatown			57°41′31″N 2°49′28″W		C(S)	23887	Upload Photo
9 Grant Street			57°41′24″N 2°49′16″W		C(S)	23713	Upload Photo
33 Grant Street, Bank Of Scotland			57°41′27″N 2°49′11″W		B	23715	Upload Photo
North Deskford Street, Railway Bridge			57°41′28″N 2°49′26″W		C(S)	23730	Upload Photo
5 Seafield Place (Former Free Church Manse)			57°41′24″N 2°49′05″W		B	23735	Upload Photo
11 Seafield Place, Norwood			57°41′28″N 2°48′58″W		C(S)	23738	Upload Photo
15, 17, 19 Seafield Street And The Square, Seafield Arms Hotel And Town Hall			57°41′28″N 2°49′07″W		A	23743	Upload another image
43, 45 Seafield Street			57°41′31″N 2°49′16″W		C(S)	23749	Upload Photo
53 Seafield Street			57°41′32″N 2°49′18″W		C(S)	23752	Upload Photo
Seafield Street, Meeting House (Former Store)			57°41′34″N 2°49′20″W		B	23755	Upload Photo
8, 10 Seafield Street			57°41′25″N 2°49′05″W		C(S)	23757	Upload Photo
12, 12A Seafield Street			57°41′25″N 2°49′06″W		C(S)	23758	Upload Photo
Cullen House, Ivy Bridge Over Burn Of Cullen			57°40′55″N 2°49′43″W		B	2224	Upload Photo
174 Seatown			57°41′31″N 2°49′32″W		C(S)	23912	Upload Photo
182 Seatown, Methodist Church			57°41′31″N 2°49′35″W		C(S)	23916	Upload Photo
185 Seatown			57°41′32″N 2°49′35″W		C(S)	23918	Upload Photo
208 Seatown			57°41′32″N 2°49′38″W		C(S)	23931	Upload Photo
212 Seatown			57°41′32″N 2°49′36″W		C(S)	23934	Upload Photo
216 Seatown			57°41′32″N 2°49′35″W		C(S)	23936	Upload Photo
217 Seatown			57°41′32″N 2°49′34″W		C(S)	23937	Upload Photo
221 Seatown			57°41′32″N 2°49′32″W		C(S)	23940	Upload Photo
234 Seatown			57°41′32″N 2°49′27″W		C(S)	23950	Upload Photo
14, 16 Seafield Street			57°41′26″N 2°49′06″W		C(S)	23759	Upload Photo
21 South Castle Street			57°41′25″N 2°49′13″W		C(S)	23771	Upload Photo
12 South Deskford Street And Industrial Chimney Stack At Rear			57°41′21″N 2°49′12″W		C(S)	23774	Upload Photo
22, 24 South Deskford Street, Lawtie's Mortification			57°41′22″N 2°49′14″W		B	23776	Upload Photo
17 Victoria Street			57°41′33″N 2°48′59″W		C(S)	23790	Upload Photo
5 Seatown (Castle Terrace)			57°41′29″N 2°49′31″W		C(S)	23806	Upload Photo
8 Seatown (Castle Terrace)			57°41′29″N 2°49′31″W		C(S)	23807	Upload Photo
33 Seatown (Castle Terrace)			57°41′31″N 2°49′42″W		C(S)	23817	Upload Photo
55, 56 Seatown			57°41′32″N 2°49′44″W		C(S)	23824	Upload Photo
58 Seatown			57°41′32″N 2°49′42″W		C(S)	23825	Upload Photo
67 Seatown			57°41′32″N 2°49′39″W		C(S)	23832	Upload Photo
79 Seatown			57°41′30″N 2°49′34″W		C(S)	23842	Upload Photo
84 Seatown			57°41′29″N 2°49′33″W		C(S)	23846	Upload Photo
99 Seatown			57°41′30″N 2°49′30″W		C(S)	23858	Upload Photo
103 Seatown			57°41′30″N 2°49′29″W		C(S)	23861	Upload Photo
107 Seatown			57°41′30″N 2°49′27″W		C(S)	23864	Upload Photo
110 Seatown			57°41′31″N 2°49′26″W		C(S)	23865	Upload Photo
124 Seatown			57°41′32″N 2°49′23″W		C(S)	23876	Upload Photo
142 Seatown			57°41′31″N 2°49′30″W		C(S)	23891	Upload Photo
16 North Castle Street			57°41′27″N 2°49′18″W		B	23726	Upload Photo
Seafield Street, Railway Viaduct			57°41′30″N 2°49′15″W		B	23746	Upload another image
Cullen Old Church (Parish Church Of Scotland) And Burial Ground			57°41′04″N 2°49′40″W		A	2218	Upload Photo
Cullen House, Claypots Bridge Over The Burn Of Cullen			57°41′14″N 2°49′59″W		B	2222	Upload Photo
161 Seatown			57°41′31″N 2°49′31″W		C(S)	23903	Upload Photo
166 Seatown			57°41′32″N 2°49′27″W		C(S)	23906	Upload Photo
183 Seatown			57°41′32″N 2°49′36″W		C(S)	23917	Upload Photo
196 Seatown			57°41′32″N 2°49′40″W		C(S)	23922	Upload Photo
203 Seatown			57°41′33″N 2°49′40″W		C(S)	23928	Upload Photo
206 Seatown			57°41′32″N 2°49′39″W		C(S)	23930	Upload Photo
225 Seatown			57°41′31″N 2°49′29″W		B	23944	Upload Photo
232 Seatown			57°41′32″N 2°49′28″W		C(S)	23948	Upload Photo
236 Seatown			57°41′32″N 2°49′27″W		C(S)	23952	Upload Photo
242 Seatown			57°41′32″N 2°49′27″W		C(S)	23954	Upload Photo
258 Seatown			57°41′32″N 2°49′36″W		B	23956	Upload Photo
7 South Castle Street			57°41′23″N 2°49′09″W		C(S)	23768	Upload Photo
6 South Castle Street			57°41′22″N 2°49′09″W		C(S)	23772	Upload Photo
18, 20 South Deskford Street Lawtie's Mortification			57°41′22″N 2°49′14″W		C(S)	23775	Upload Photo
34 South Deskford Street			57°41′23″N 2°49′17″W		C(S)	23778	Upload Photo
8, 10, 12 The Square			57°41′28″N 2°49′12″W		B	23783	Upload Photo
11, 13 Victoria Street			57°41′32″N 2°48′57″W		B	23788	Upload Photo
23 Victoria Street			57°41′34″N 2°49′02″W		B	23793	Upload Photo
York Place, Drummore House And Garden Walls			57°41′21″N 2°49′01″W		B	23799	Upload Photo
1 Seatown (Castle Terrace)			57°41′29″N 2°49′30″W		C(S)	23804	Upload Photo
66 Seatown			57°41′32″N 2°49′40″W		C(S)	23831	Upload Photo
83 Seatown			57°41′30″N 2°49′33″W		C(S)	23845	Upload Photo
104, 104 And A Half Seatown			57°41′30″N 2°49′28″W		C(S)	23862	Upload Photo
123A Seatown			57°41′33″N 2°49′23″W		C(S)	23875	Upload Photo
131 Seatown			57°41′31″N 2°49′26″W		C(S)	23883	Upload Photo
138 Seatown			57°41′31″N 2°49′29″W		B	23889	Upload Photo
11 Grant Street			57°41′24″N 2°49′16″W		C(S)	23714	Upload Photo
12 Grant Street			57°41′26″N 2°49′15″W		C(S)	23717	Upload Photo
North Castle Street, Railway Viaduct			57°41′28″N 2°49′22″W		B	23721	Upload another image
24 North Castle Street			57°41′27″N 2°49′20″W		B	23728	Upload Photo
Seafield Farm, Dovecot			57°41′18″N 2°48′50″W		C(S)	23733	Upload Photo
9 Seafield Place			57°41′27″N 2°48′59″W		B	23737	Upload Photo
23, 25 Seafield Street, 16 The Square			57°41′29″N 2°49′11″W		B	23744	Upload Photo
39 Seafield Street			57°41′31″N 2°49′15″W		C(S)	23748	Upload Photo
147 Seatown			57°41′30″N 2°49′33″W		C(S)	23894	Upload Photo
151 Seatown			57°41′31″N 2°49′33″W		B	23896	Upload Photo
156 Seatown			57°41′31″N 2°49′35″W		B	23900	Upload Photo
168 Seatown			57°41′32″N 2°49′30″W		C(S)	23908	Upload Photo
173 Seatown			57°41′31″N 2°49′32″W		C(S)	23911	Upload Photo
175 Seatown			57°41′31″N 2°49′33″W		C(S)	23913	Upload Photo
193 Seatown			57°41′32″N 2°49′39″W		C(S)	23919	Upload Photo
200 Seatown			57°41′32″N 2°49′42″W		C(S)	23925	Upload Photo
204 Seatown			57°41′32″N 2°49′39″W		C(S)	23929	Upload Photo
222 Seatown			57°41′32″N 2°49′31″W		C(S)	23941	Upload Photo
223 Seatown			57°41′32″N 2°49′31″W		C(S)	23942	Upload Photo
237 Seatown			57°41′32″N 2°49′25″W		C(S)	23953	Upload Photo
7 Victoria Street			57°41′31″N 2°48′56″W		B	23958	Upload Photo
36 Seafield Street, 7, 9 The Square			57°41′27″N 2°49′10″W		B	23763	Upload Photo
26 South Castle Street			57°41′24″N 2°49′13″W		C(S)	23773	Upload Photo
Seatown Lodge, Gates And Flanking Railings, Cullen House			57°41′30″N 2°49′47″W		B	23800	Upload Photo
25 Seatown (Castle Terrace)			57°41′30″N 2°49′37″W		C(S)	23812	Upload Photo
31, 32 Seatown (Castle Terrace)			57°41′31″N 2°49′41″W		C(S)	23816	Upload Photo
34 Seatown (Castle Terrace) Royal Oak Hotel			57°41′31″N 2°49′43″W		C(S)	23818	Upload Photo
92 Seatown			57°41′30″N 2°49′27″W		C(S)	23853	Upload Photo
96 Seatown			57°41′30″N 2°49′31″W		C(S)	23856	Upload Photo
114 Seatown			57°41′31″N 2°49′25″W		B	23867	Upload Photo
121 Seatown			57°41′33″N 2°49′24″W		C(S)	23872	Upload Photo
126 Seatown			57°41′32″N 2°49′22″W		C(S)	23878	Upload Photo
130 Seatown			57°41′31″N 2°49′26″W		C(S)	23882	Upload Photo
Telephone Kiosk By 134 Seatown			57°41′31″N 2°49′28″W		B	23886	Upload Photo
1, 3 Grant Street			57°41′23″N 2°49′17″W		B	23711	Upload Photo
7 Grant Street			57°41′24″N 2°49′16″W		C(S)	23712	Upload Photo
1, 3 North Castle Street			57°41′27″N 2°49′16″W		C(S)	23719	Upload Photo
8 North Castle Street			57°41′26″N 2°49′17″W		B	23722	Upload Photo
21 Reidhaven Street			57°41′30″N 2°49′06″W		B	23731	Upload Photo
3 Seafield Street			57°41′26″N 2°49′03″W		B	23739	Upload Photo
47, 47A Seafield Street			57°41′32″N 2°49′16″W		B	23750	Upload Photo
Cullen House Bridge Over The Burn Of Cullen			57°41′00″N 2°49′49″W		A	2220	Upload Photo
Cullen House, Lintmill Lodge			57°40′38″N 2°49′13″W		C(S)	2226	Upload Photo
153 Seatown			57°41′31″N 2°49′34″W		B	23897	Upload Photo
167 Seatown			57°41′32″N 2°49′26″W		B	23907	Upload Photo
171 Seatown			57°41′31″N 2°49′32″W		C(S)	23909	Upload Photo
211 Seatown			57°41′32″N 2°49′37″W		C(S)	23933	Upload Photo
218 Seatown			57°41′32″N 2°49′33″W		C(S)	23938	Upload Photo
233 Seatown			57°41′31″N 2°49′28″W		B	23949	Upload Photo
3 Victoria Street			57°41′31″N 2°48′54″W		B	23957	Upload Photo
48 Seafield Street			57°41′29″N 2°49′13″W		B	23766	Upload Photo
The Square, Burgh Cross			57°41′28″N 2°49′10″W		B	23779	Upload another image
1 Victoria Street			57°41′30″N 2°48′54″W		C(S)	23785	Upload Photo
19 Victoria Street			57°41′34″N 2°49′00″W		C(S)	23791	Upload Photo
21 Victoria Street			57°41′34″N 2°49′01″W		B	23792	Upload Photo
40 Seatown			57°41′30″N 2°49′26″W		B	23821	Upload Photo
59 Seatown And Store			57°41′31″N 2°49′41″W		C(S)	23827	Upload Photo
60 Seatown			57°41′31″N 2°49′41″W		B	23828	Upload Photo
68 Seatown			57°41′31″N 2°49′38″W		C(S)	23833	Upload Photo
71 Seatown			57°41′31″N 2°49′38″W		B	23836	Upload Photo
80 Seatown			57°41′30″N 2°49′34″W		C(S)	23843	Upload Photo
89 Seatown			57°41′30″N 2°49′29″W		C(S)	23850	Upload Photo
95 Seatown			57°41′30″N 2°49′26″W		B	23855	Upload Photo
117 Seatown			57°41′32″N 2°49′23″W		C(S)	23869	Upload Photo
123 Seatown			57°41′33″N 2°49′22″W		C(S)	23874	Upload Photo
128 Seatown			57°41′32″N 2°49′25″W		C(S)	23880	Upload Photo
10 North Castle Street			57°41′26″N 2°49′17″W		B	23723	Upload Photo
26, 28 North Castle Street			57°41′27″N 2°49′21″W		B	23729	Upload Photo
7 Seafield Place			57°41′24″N 2°49′03″W		B	23736	Upload Photo
Cullen House, Stables			57°41′05″N 2°49′40″W		B	2214	Upload Photo
Cullen House, Lintmill Bridge Over The Burn Of Cullen			57°40′37″N 2°49′14″W		C(S)	2225	Upload Photo
154 Seatown			57°41′31″N 2°49′35″W		B	23898	Upload Photo
157 Seatown			57°41′31″N 2°49′34″W		C(S)	23901	Upload Photo
219 Seatown			57°41′32″N 2°49′33″W		C(S)	23939	Upload Photo
8 Victoria Street			57°41′32″N 2°48′55″W		B	23959	Upload Photo
32, 32A, 34 Seafield Street, Shop, Tarnash And Sandyford			57°41′27″N 2°49′09″W		B	23762	Upload Photo
50, 52 Seafield Street, Trustee Savings Bank			57°41′30″N 2°49′14″W		C(S)	23767	Upload Photo
9 South Castle Street			57°41′24″N 2°49′10″W		C(S)	23769	Upload Photo
The Square, War Memorial			57°41′30″N 2°49′08″W		B	23780	Upload another image
9 Victoria Street			57°41′32″N 2°48′57″W		B	23787	Upload Photo
14 Victoria Street			57°41′33″N 2°48′57″W		B	23797	Upload Photo
29 Seatown (Castle Terrace)			57°41′30″N 2°49′39″W		C(S)	23814	Upload Photo
30 Seatown (Castle Terrace)			57°41′30″N 2°49′39″W		C(S)	23815	Upload Photo
49 Seatown			57°41′32″N 2°49′45″W		C(S)	23822	Upload Photo
61 Seatown			57°41′31″N 2°49′40″W		C(S)	23829	Upload Photo
74 Seatown			57°41′31″N 2°49′37″W		B	23837	Upload Photo
91 Seatown			57°41′30″N 2°49′28″W		C(S)	23852	Upload Photo
94 Seatown			57°41′30″N 2°49′26″W		C(S)	23854	Upload Photo
125 Seatown			57°41′33″N 2°49′22″W		C(S)	23877	Upload Photo
127 Seatown			57°41′32″N 2°49′23″W		C(S)	23879	Upload Photo
133 Seatown			57°41′31″N 2°49′28″W		C(S)	23885	Upload Photo
137 Seatown			57°41′31″N 2°49′29″W		C(S)	23888	Upload Photo
144 Seatown, Gospel Hall			57°41′31″N 2°49′31″W		C(S)	23892	Upload Photo
146 Seatown			57°41′30″N 2°49′32″W		C(S)	23893	Upload Photo
Grant Street, Entrance Gates To Cullen House And Gatepiers			57°41′23″N 2°49′19″W		B	23710	Upload Photo
5 North Castle Street			57°41′27″N 2°49′17″W		B	23720	Upload Photo
14 North Castle Street			57°41′26″N 2°49′18″W		B	23725	Upload Photo
23 Reidhaven Street, The Old Schoolhouse			57°41′31″N 2°49′07″W		C(S)	23732	Upload Photo
Old Cullen, House, Gatepiers And Gates			57°41′06″N 2°49′38″W		B	2215	Upload Photo
Cullen House, Icehouse			57°41′00″N 2°49′53″W		B	2223	Upload Photo

== Key ==
The scheme for classifying buildings in Scotland is:

- Category A: "buildings of national or international importance, either architectural or historic; or fine, little-altered examples of some particular period, style or building type."
- Category B: "buildings of regional or more than local importance; or major examples of some particular period, style or building type, which may have been altered."
- Category C: "buildings of local importance; lesser examples of any period, style, or building type, as originally constructed or moderately altered; and simple traditional buildings which group well with other listed buildings."

In March 2016 there were 47,288 listed buildings in Scotland. Of these, 8% were Category A, and 50% were Category B, with the remaining 42% being Category C.

== See also ==
- List of listed buildings in Moray
