= Cullen Town Hall =

Municipal building in Cullen, Scotland

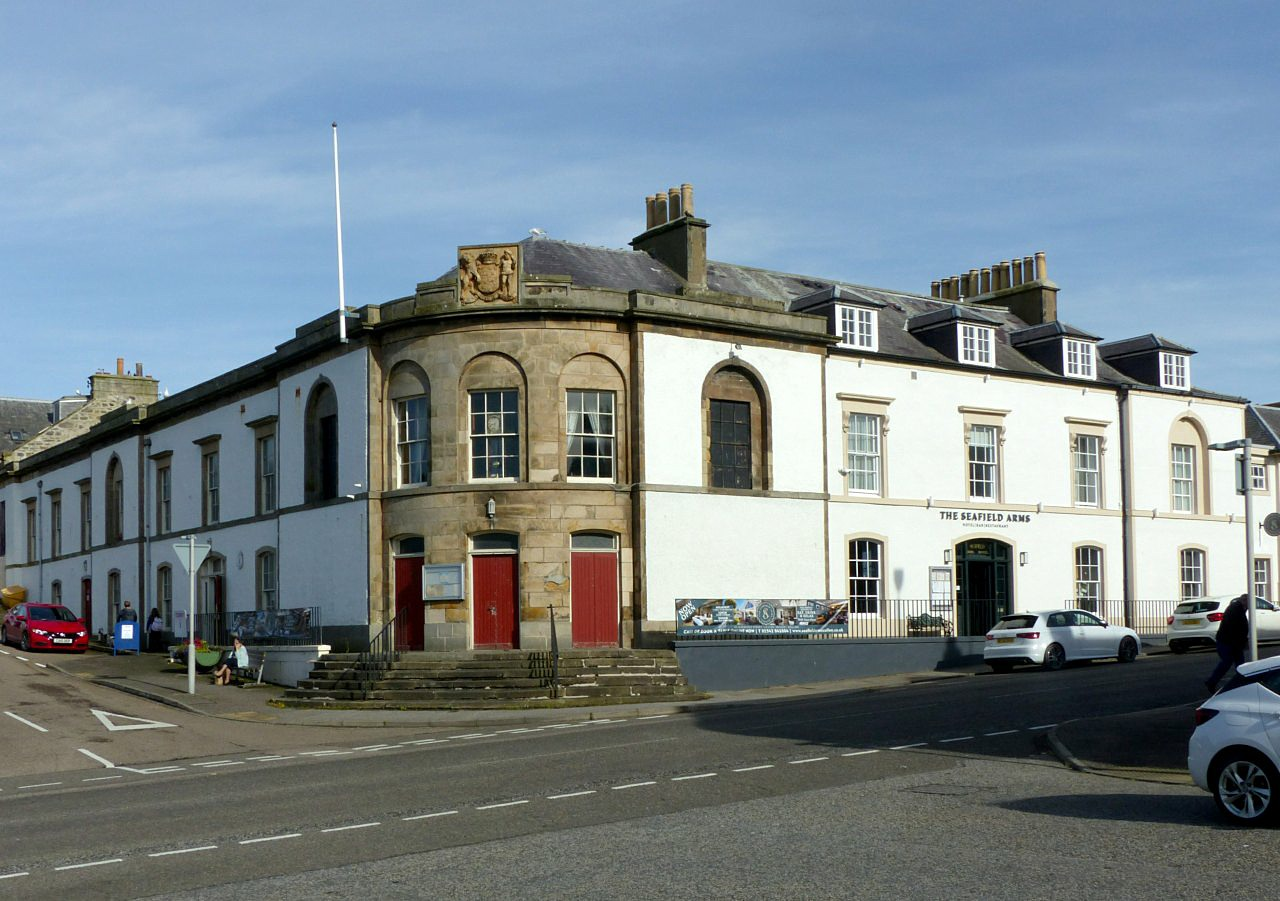
- Cullen Town Hall (on the left) and the Seafield Arms Hotel (on the right)

- Shown in Moray
- 57.6911°N 2.8189°W
- Location: The Square, Cullen

History
- Built: 1823

Site notes
- Architect: William Robertson
- Architectural style: Neoclassical style

Listed Building – Category B
- Official name: Cullen Town Hall and Seafield Arms Hotel, 15, 17, and 19 Seafield Street and The Square, excluding both 2-storey and attic wings adjoining north elevation of hotel, Cullen
- Designated: 22 February 1972
- Reference no.: LB23743

Cullen Town Hall is a municipal building in The Square, Cullen, Moray, Scotland. The structure, which is currently used as a heritage centre, is a Category B listed building.

== History ==
The first municipal building in Cullen was a tolbooth in the old town area, close to the Burn of Cullen, which dated back at least to the 16th century. In the early 19th century, following extensive flooding of the houses in the old town, the local land-owner, Ludovick Ogilvy-Grant, 5th Earl of Seafield, invited George MacWilliam to prepare a masterplan for a new town to be constructed approximately 0.5 miles (800 metres) to southeast of the old town. The centrepiece of this new town was to be the town square and, on the east side of the town square, MacWilliam envisaged there would be a combined town hall and coaching house. The new town hall and coaching house was designed by William Robertson in the neoclassical style, built in ashlar stone with a harled finish at a cost of £3,000 and was completed in summer 1823.

The design involved a symmetrical curved main frontage of three bays on the corner of The Square and Seafield Street. The curved section featured three segmental headed doorways on the ground floor and three sash windows set in round headed recesses on the first floor. At roof level, there was a parapet and a carved coat of arms of the Earl of Seafield in a panel above. Wings of five bays each were erected to the left and the right of the curved section to accommodate the town hall and the coaching house respectively. The wings featured wider outer bays which were slightly projected forward and were fenestrated by sash windows set in round headed recesses on the first floor. The central sections of the wings, each of three bays, featured segmental headed doorways flanked by segmental headed windows on the ground floor, and square headed sash windows with architraves and cornices on the first floor. A five-bay stable bloc, which extended along Seafield Street, was erected to the east of the main building. Internally, the principal rooms were a ballroom, a courtroom and three prisoner cells; the courtroom, which was located behind the curved section on the first floor, was later adapted for use as a council chamber. Meanwhile, the coaching house evolved to become the Seafield Arms Hotel.

The author, George MacDonald, gave a lecture on the life of the poet, Robert Burns, in the town hall in 1873. A four-bay extension to the north to create a library facing The Square was built to a design by John Fowlie and was completed in 1900. Following a major fire in the town hall in 1942, extensive repairs were carried out to a design by George Legg and completed in 1953. The town hall was also used for concerts and performers there included the rock band, Status Quo, in November 1969. The building continued to serve as the meeting place of the burgh council for much of the 20th century, but ceased to be the local seat of government when the enlarged Banff and Buchan District Council was formed in 1975.

The Seafield Arms Hotel fell vacant in the early part of the 21st century and was acquired by a local developer, Milne Property Developments, in 2014: it was refurbished at a cost of £1.4 million and re-opened in May 2019. After Moray Council announced the proposed closure of the town hall, it was also acquired by Milne Property Developments, in January 2019. The developer subsequently instigated works to convert the first floor of the town hall into extra space for the Seafield Arms Hotel, and leased the ground floor to the Cullen, Deskford and Portknockie Heritage Group for a nominal rental. Additional works to convert the ground floor into a heritage centre were carried out at a cost of £60,000 and the new heritage centre was officially opened by the Lord Lieutenant of Banffshire, Andrew Simpson, on 14 September 2022.

== See also ==
- List of listed buildings in Cullen, Moray
