= Cullen Castle =

Castle in Scotland

Coordinates: 57.69036°N 2.8256°W

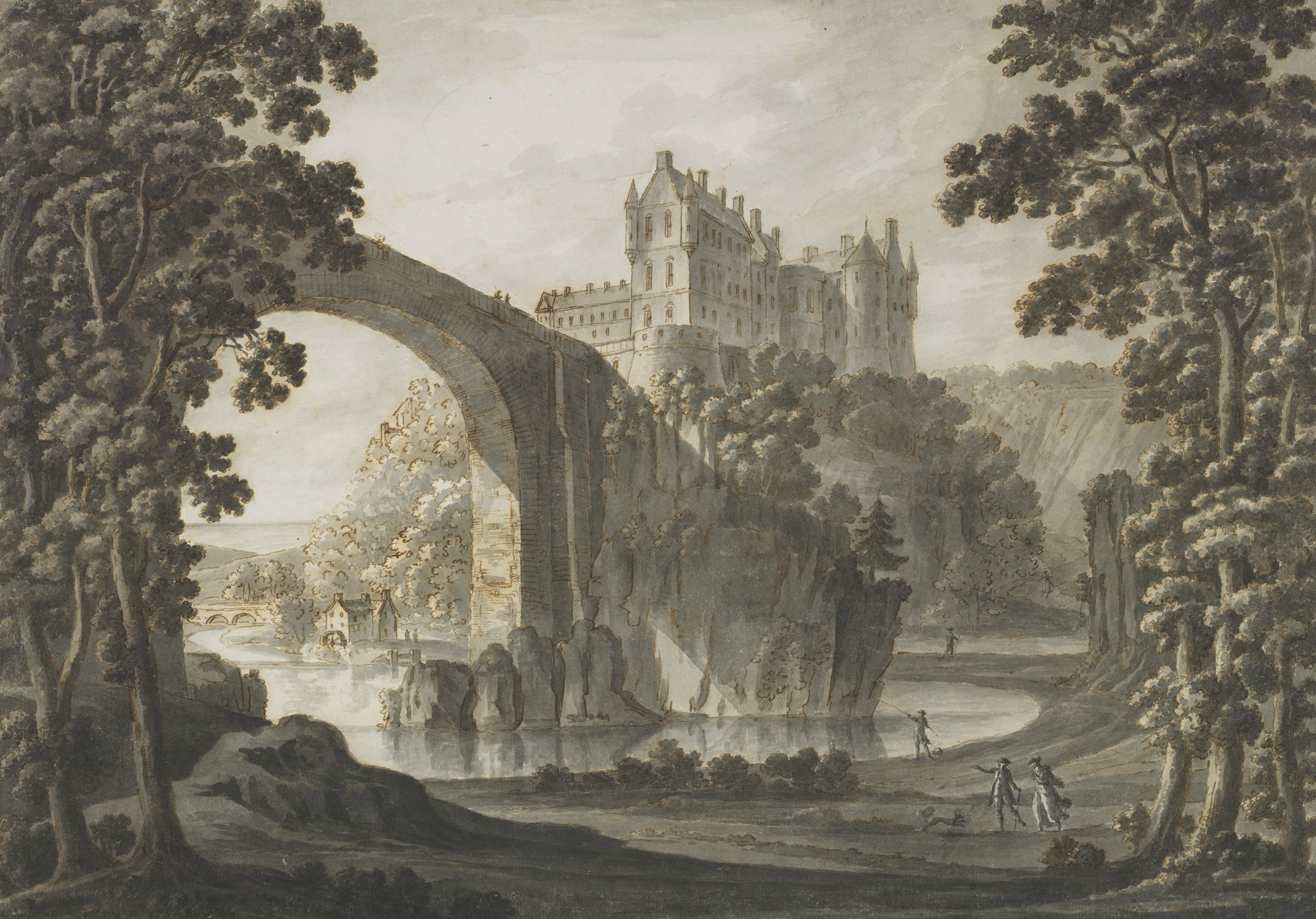
“Cullen Castle, Banffshire,” pen and brown ink and grey wash over black chalk on paper, Robert Adam (1728-1792)

Cullen Castle was a royal castle about 0.5 miles (0.8 km) west of Cullen, Moray, Scotland, west of the burn of Deskford and south of Seatown. The remains have been designated a scheduled monument, accessible to the public.

== History ==
Vestiges of the castle remained until the 19th century.

== Structure ==
It is believed that the castle, on Castle Hill, was a motte, encircled by a wide ditch and outer rampart, except on the north where a landslip has destroyed it. The ditch is about 6.0 metres (19.7 ft) wide and 1.75 metres (5 ft 9 in) deep; the outer bank is about 6.0 metres (19.7 ft) wide and 1.5 metres (4 ft 11 in) high.

The mound of the motte has been covered by a network of ancient paths. Excavations were conducted in February–October 2017 to restore parts of the network and minimise erosion. Eight test pits were dug of which seven located the main path. The other one was dug in an area less disturbed by foot traffic and did not locate the path despite being excavated to a depth of 150 millimetres (5.9 in). Foundation bases for picnic tables and benches and a replacement flagpole socket were installed during the excavations. No finds or features of archaeological interest were found.
