= Bin of Cullen =

Hill in Moray, Scotland

Coordinates: 57.66528°N 2.87344°W

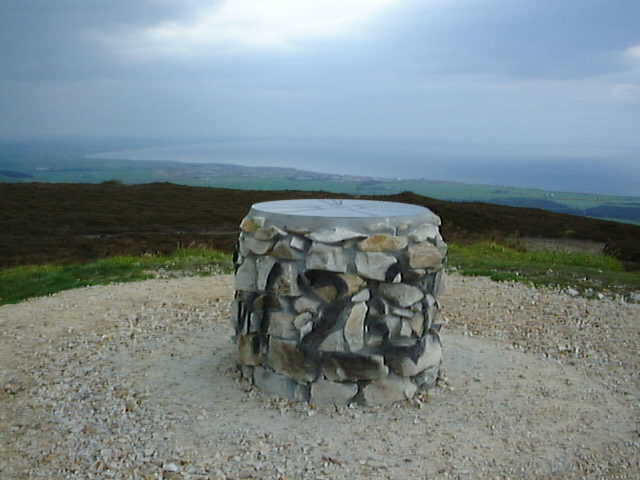
The summit cairn erected in 2000

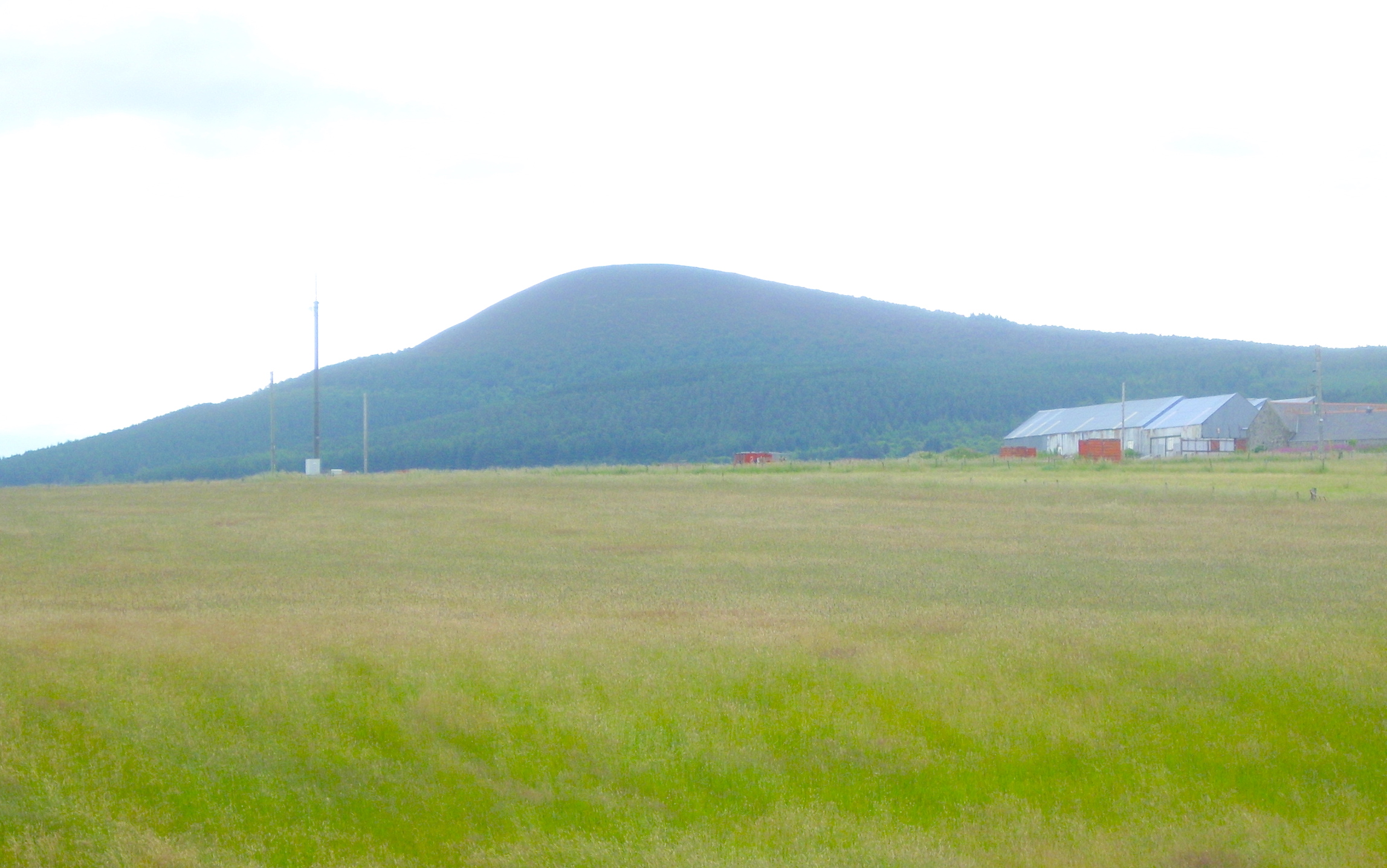
The Bin as seen from Buckie in 2008

The Bin of Cullen or Bin (Scottish Gaelic: Am Binnean) is a hill in Moray, Scotland. It lies south-west of Cullen.

The Bin is 320 m (1050 ft) in height above sea-level and is formed of Dalradian rock.
