= Cullen Viaduct =

Bridge in Moray, Scotland

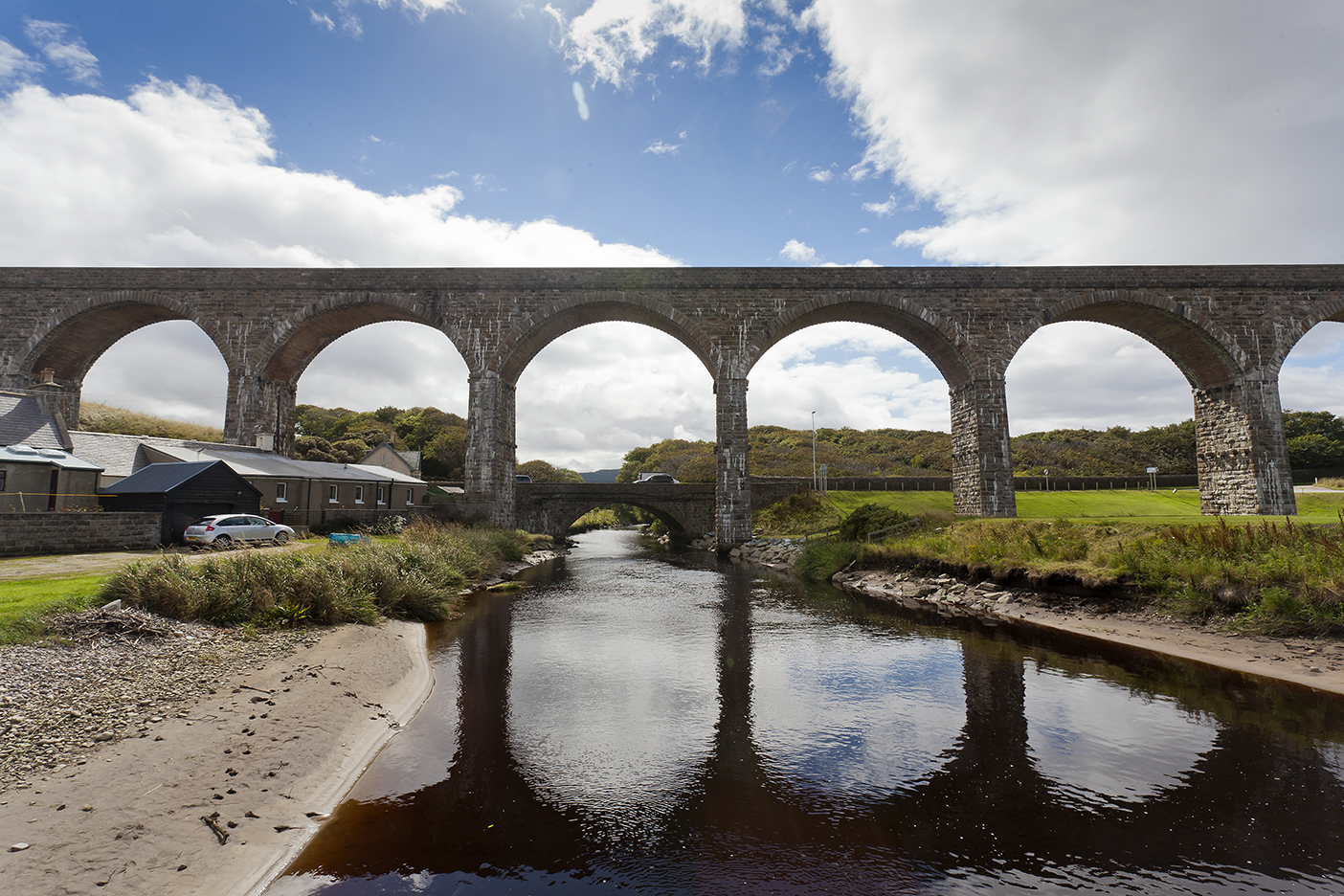
- Pictured in 2011
- Coordinates: 57.6921°N 2.8303°W
- Carries: Great North of Scotland Railway (formerly)
- Crosses: Burn of Cullen; A98
- Locale: Moray

Characteristics
- Material: Stone

History
- Opened: 1886 (140 years ago)

Listed Building – Category B
- Official name: Seatown, Viaduct Over Burn Of Cullen
- Designated: 22 February 1972
- Reference no.: LB23802

Listed Building – Category B
- Official name: Seafield Street, Railway Viaduct
- Designated: 22 February 1972
- Reference no.: LB23746

Listed Building – Category B
- Official name: North Castle Street, Railway Viaduct
- Designated: 22 February 1972
- Reference no.: LB23721

Location
- Interactive map of Cullen Viaduct

The Cullen Viaduct is a former single-track railway viaduct at the Moray Firth in Cullen, Moray, Scotland. Containing eight arches, it formerly carried the Great North of Scotland Railway line between Portsoy in Aberdeenshire and Elgin in Moray. Crossing the Burn of Cullen and the A98, it was built as a result of a refusal by Seafield Estate, to the south, to have the line encroach on its land.

Work on the viaduct was completed in 1886, under the guidance of engineer P. M. Barnett; it is now a Grade B listed structure.

The line closed in 1968, and the viaduct is now used as a recreational path, part of the Moray Firth Trail and the Sustrans national cycle path.

Three other structures are located further to the east: a single span connecting North Deskford Street to the main road, a four-arch viaduct spanning North Castle Street and a four-arch bridge at the foot of Seafield Street (part of the A98), under which vehicles and pedestrians pass.

== Gallery ==
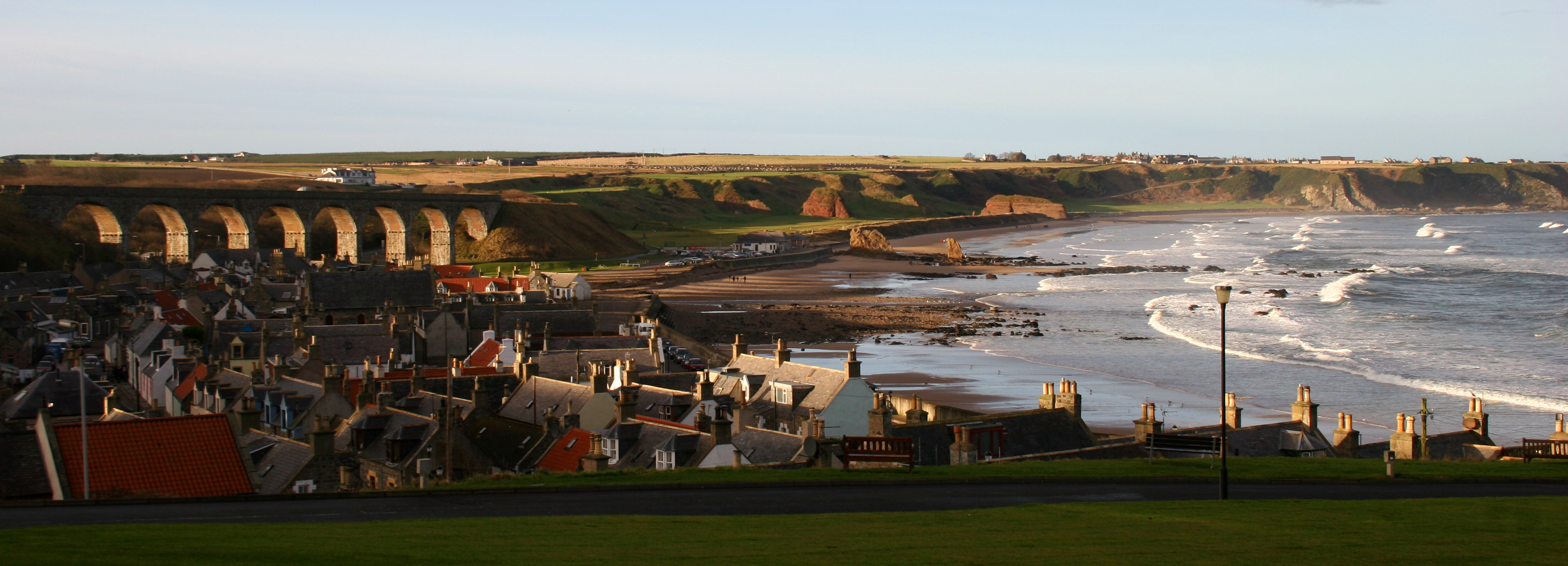
Panorama of Cullen, looking west

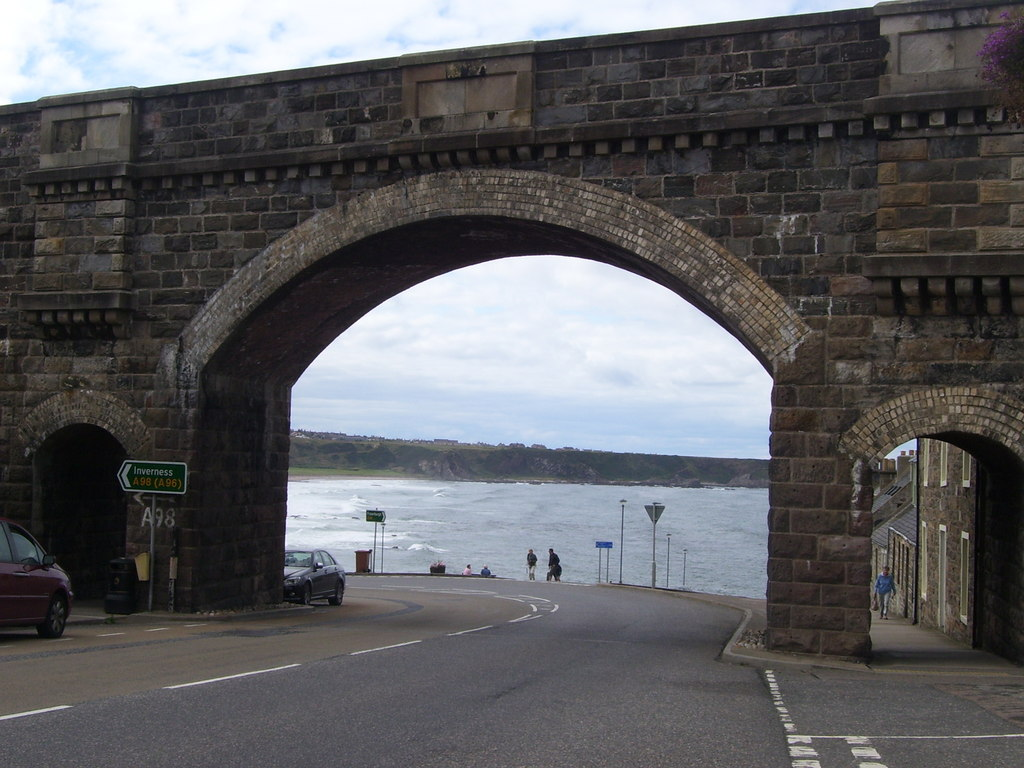
Seafield Street (the A98)

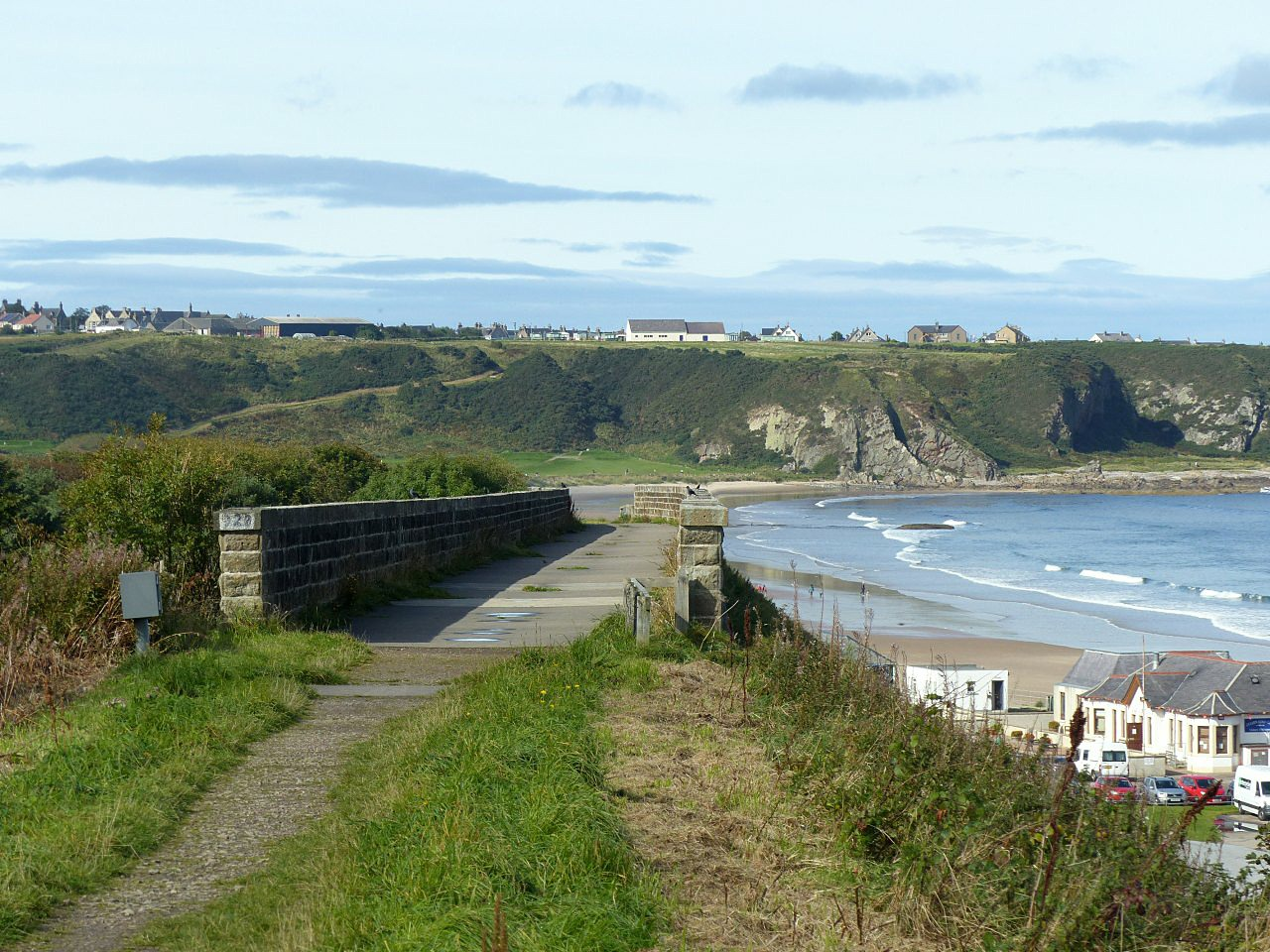
Above Cullen Golf Links

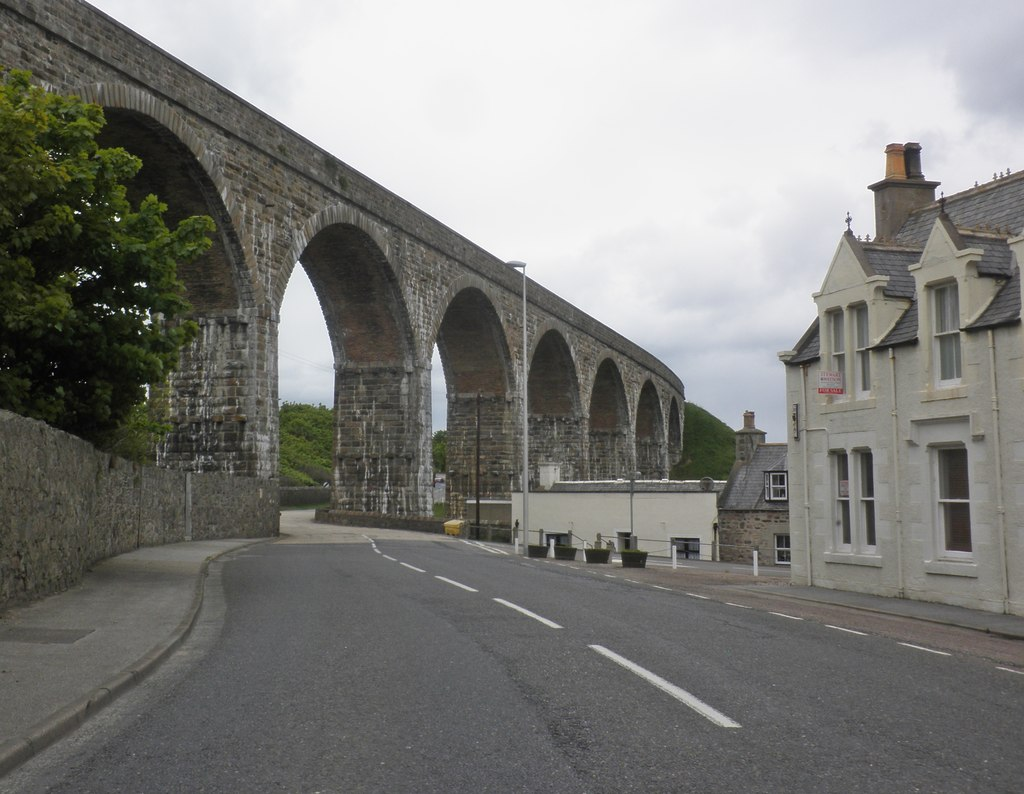
Castle Terrace (also the A98)

== See also ==
- List of bridges in Scotland
