= Cullen, Moray =

Coordinates: 57°41′29″N 02°49′09″W

Cullen: Scottish Gaelic: Inbhir Cuilinn
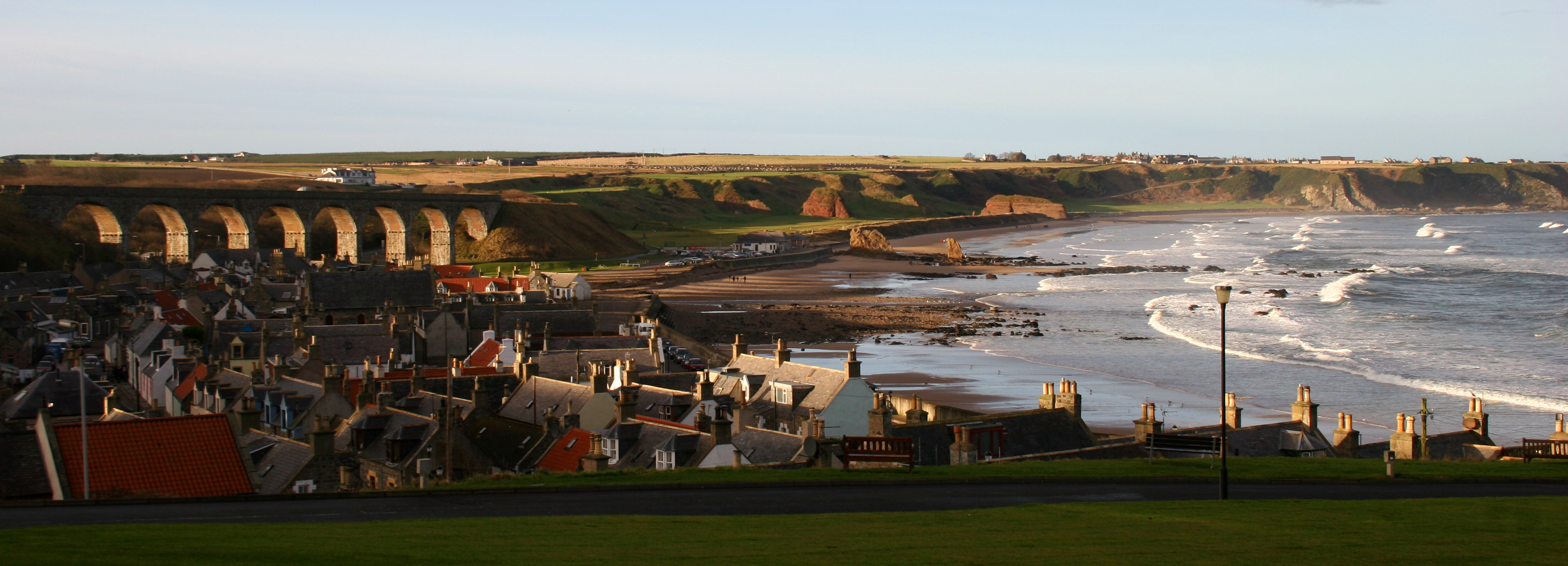
- Looking west over Cullen, with Cullen Viaduct on the left

- Location within Moray
- Population: 1,390 (2020)
- OS grid reference: NJ512672
- Council area: Moray
- Lieutenancy area: Banffshire
- Country: Scotland
- Sovereign state: United Kingdom
- Post town: BUCKIE
- Postcode district: AB56
- Dialling code: 01542
- Police: Scotland
- Fire: Scottish
- Ambulance: Scottish
- UK Parliament: Aberdeenshire North and Moray East
- Scottish Parliament: Banffshire and Buchan Coast

Cullen (Scottish Gaelic: Inbhir Cuilinn) is a village and former royal burgh in Moray but historically in Banffshire, Scotland, on the North Sea coast. The village had a population of 1,327 in 2001. The organs of the wife of Robert the Bruce are said to have been buried in its old kirk after her death in Cullen Castle. Robert made an annual payment to the village in gratitude for the treatment of his wife's body and its return south for burial. In 2000, the recent non-payment of this sum by the government was challenged and settled to the village's favour.

== History ==
Cullen has a long history, well-documented thanks to the survival of a number of sources. These are summarised in two key books: the Annals of Cullen by W Crammond (1904) and the Church Annals of Cullen by W Robertson (1938). The first deals primarily with the civil governance and the latter with church governance up to the disruption. Cullen received royal burgh status between 1153 and 1214 AD during the reigns of Malcolm IV and William I. It is also known to have received a charter in 1455 AD from James II. The burgh was abolished in 1975 by the Local Government (Scotland) Act 1973.

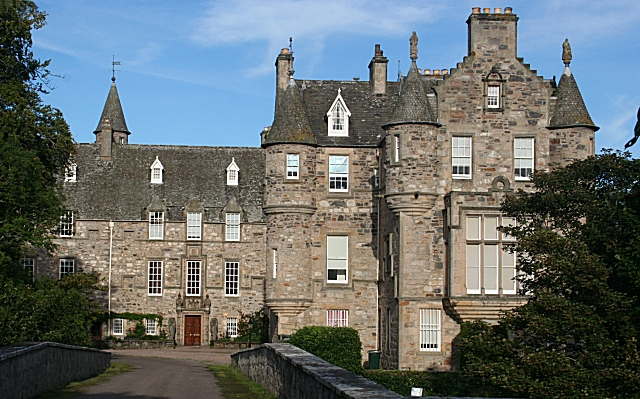
Cullen House

Around 139–161, Ptolemy mentions in his Geography the River Celnius in the North East of Scotland. Both William Forbes Skene and George Chalmers identified the Celnius with Cullen Burn. The first mention of Cullen in Scottish history was in 962, when King Indulf was killed by the Norwegians (and/or Danes) at the mouth of the River Cullen and referred to as the Battle of the Bauds. "Atween Coedlich and the sea, There lies Kings' sons three." Legend has it that within the vicinity, a Scots, a Danish and a Norwegian King are buried, marked by the three isolated rocks within Cullen Bay and named the "Three Kings". However, it is possible that these rocks derive their name from the similarity of the name Cullen with Culane (Cologne) as in the medieval mystery play "The Three Kings of Culane".

The church was founded as a chapel by King Robert the Bruce. The organs of Robert's wife are said to have been buried in its old kirk after her death at Cullen Castle; the King then made an annual payment to the village in gratitude for the treatment of his wife's body and its return south for burial. This payment (amounting to £2.10 a year) was stopped after a 1975 reform of Scottish local government. In 2000, the non-payment of this sum was challenged and settled to the village's favour.

Robert Burns stayed overnight at what was then the old town of Cullen in 1787 during his tour of the Highlands. Travelling from the west to the east he remarked that up to this point, "the country is sadly poor and unimproved".

The old town of Cullen was demolished in 1822 and its remains are next to Cullen House. It was under James Ogilvy, 7th Earl of Findlater, that plans were first mooted for moving the town, but it was not until his successor Ludovick Ogilvy-Grant, 5th Earl of Seafield, that the plans were enacted. The town was moved 0.5 miles (800 metres) away both to modernise (the houses of the old town flooded from water running down off the raised road when it rained heavily) and to provide the Earl with greater privacy. The new town was planned by George MacWilliam and built between 1820 and 1822.

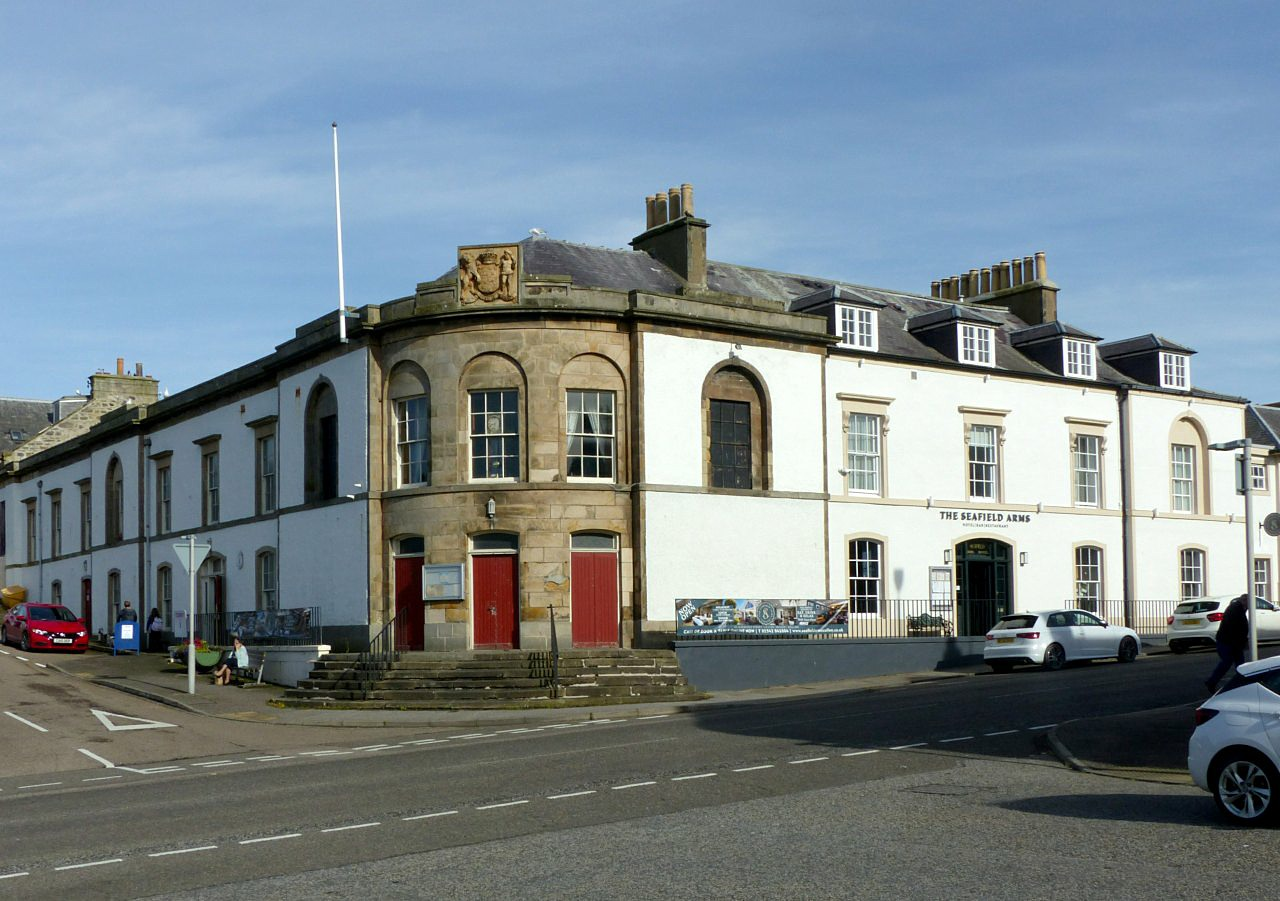
Cullen Town Hall (on the left) and the Seafield Arms Hotel (on the right)

The central market cross in the town square originally stood in the old town. During the building of the new town, it was temporarily erected at the top of the ancient fort structure that guards the entrance to the Cullen Burn, known as the Castle Hill. This resulted in the present layout of the village, a generous cross shape of two major streets, Seafield Street and Grant Street, with a central town square and "the Seatown" sandwiched on the false beach between the mouth of the burn and the harbour. In the previous layout, the town was spread along a road above and parallel to the burn, running between the Castle Hill and Cullen House, the Seatown being at the mouth of the burn where boats used to be pulled up onto the beach. The most prominent building in the new town is Cullen Town Hall, which was completed in 1823.

The fishing industry developed quickly in the 1880s, and the harbour was busy with large fishing boats, these giving way to steam drifters at the start of the 20th century. The industry became centralised on larger harbours, the boats became larger diesel-engined designs that required non-tidal access. The site of Cullen railway station was redeveloped after the station closed in 1968.

The main part of Cullen House dates from 1543. An east wing was added in 1711, and there were alterations by David Bryce in 1858. The House and estate buildings were converted into fourteen dwellings in 1983 by Kit Martin. Prior to the use of Cullen House by the Earls of Seafield, the castle of Findlater, now a ruin, on a rocky coastal outcrop approximately 2 miles (3 kilometres) to the east, was the Earl's seat.

== Fishing ==
Reporting on Cullen in 1911, the Annual Report of the Fishery Board states: "Line fishing only prosecuted locally; fishermen chiefly employed at herring fishing at the principal centres in Scotland, England and Ireland.". The principal kinds of fish landed in Cullen for that year were codlings and haddocks.

Fishery Statistics

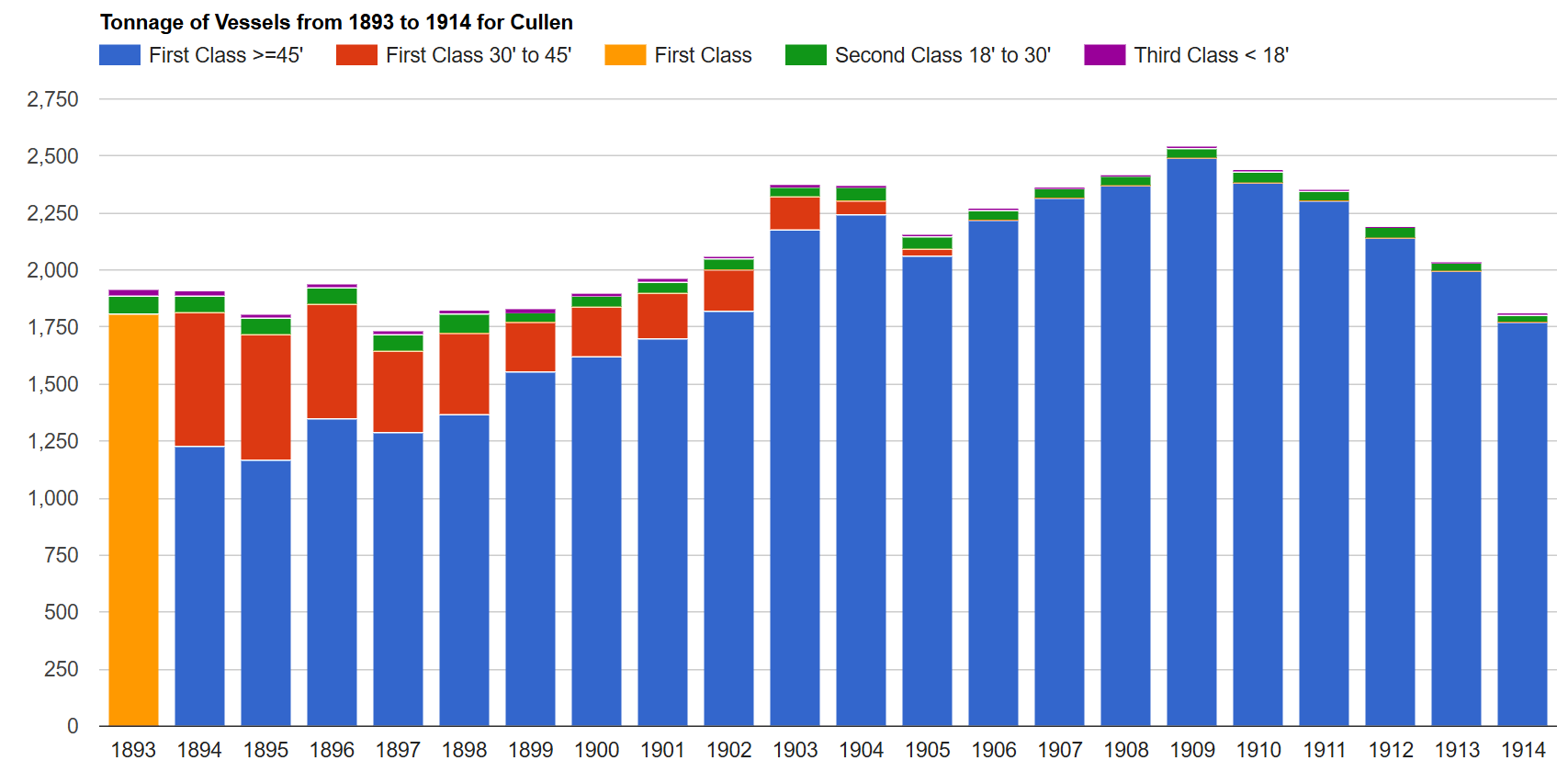
Tonnage of vessels

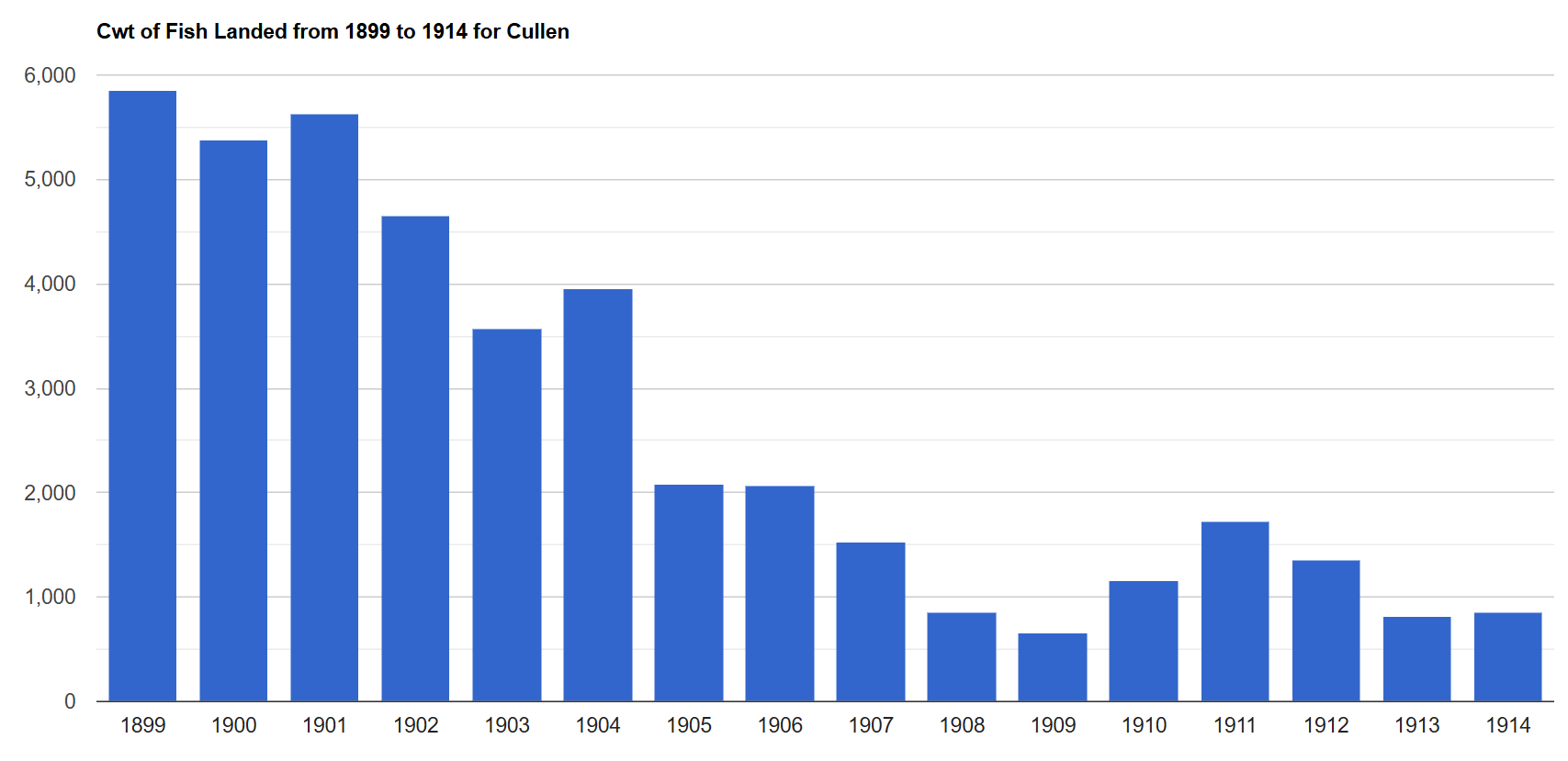
Cwt of fish landed

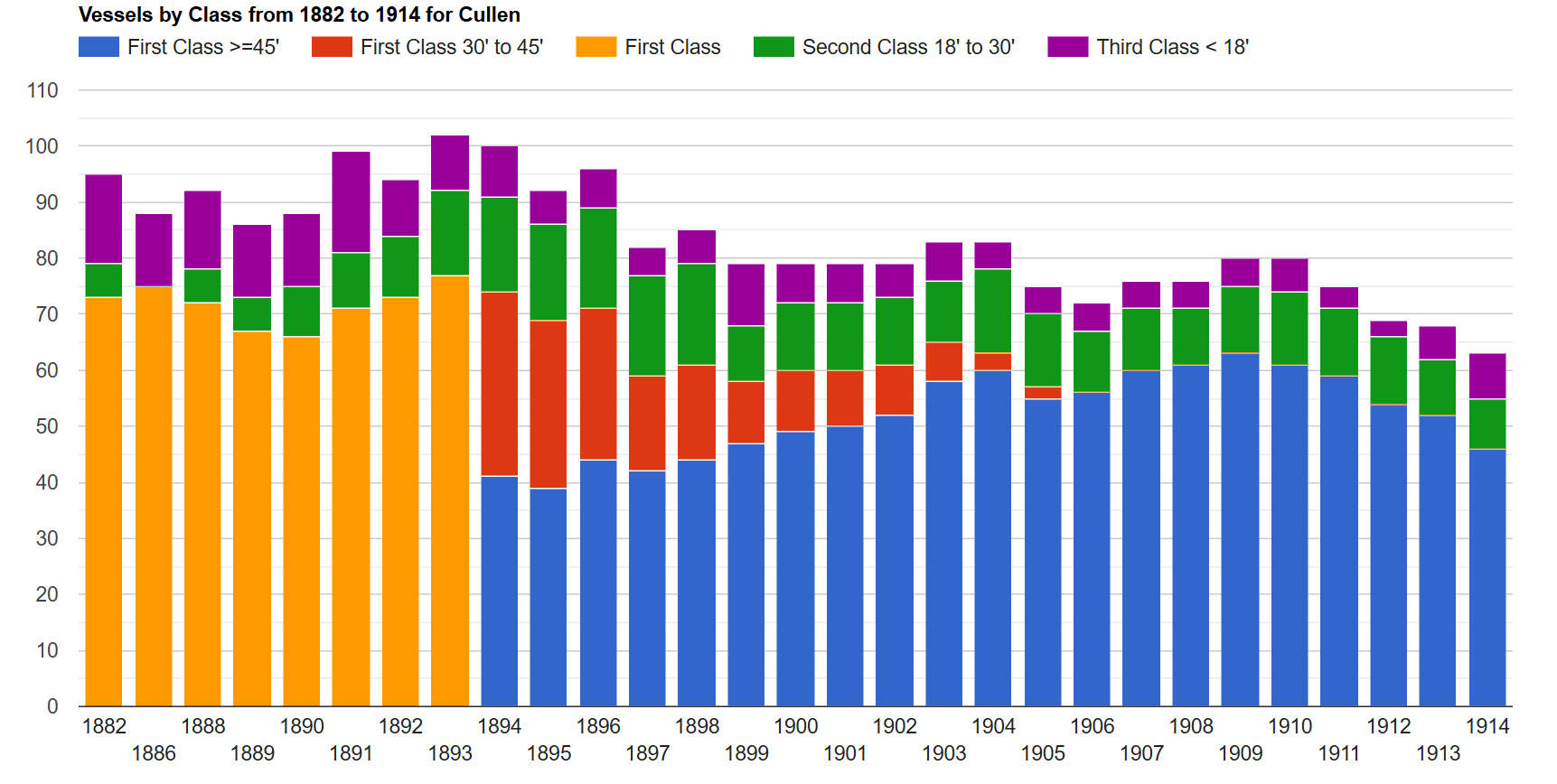
Vessels by class

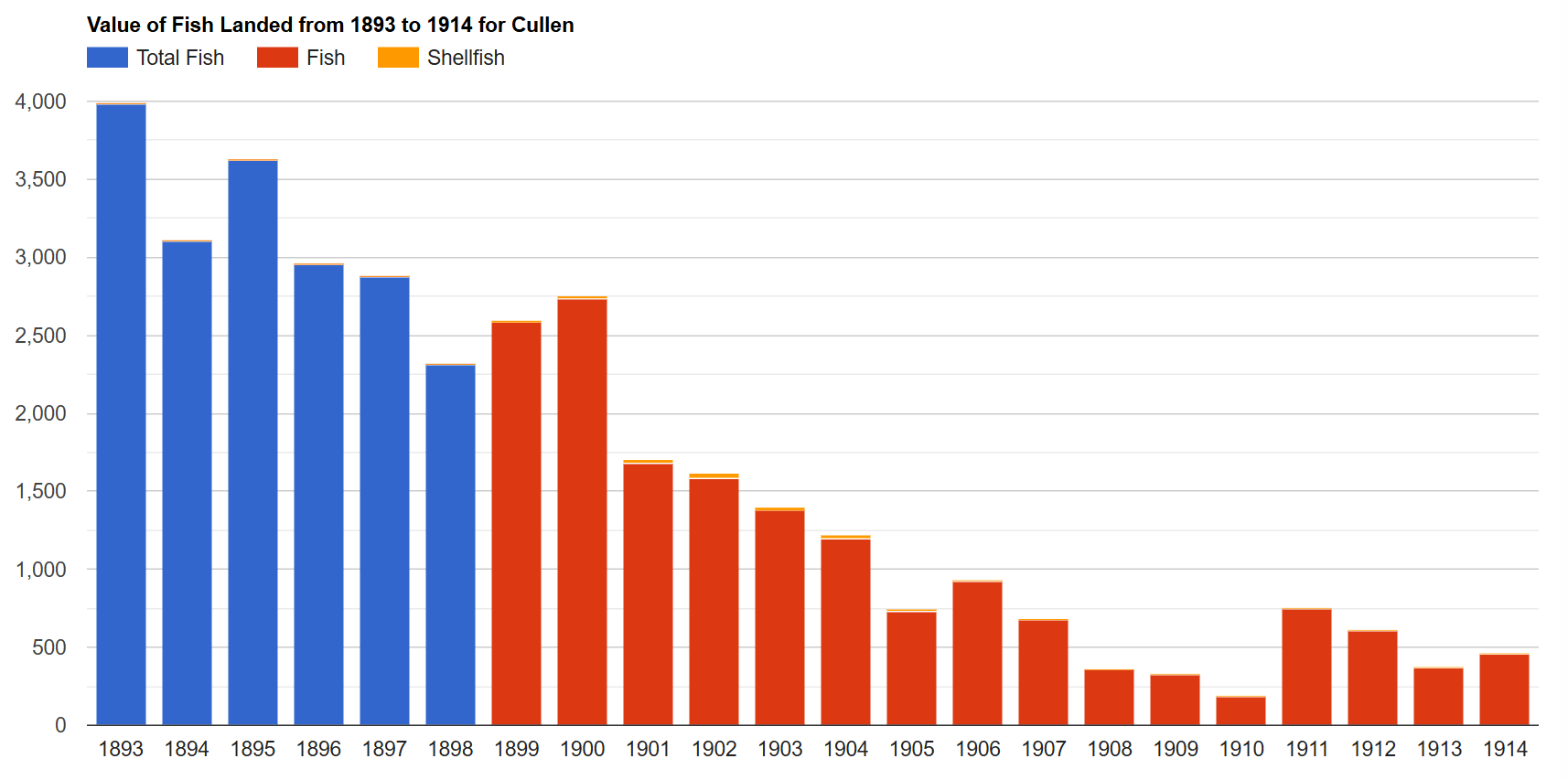
Value (£) of fish landed

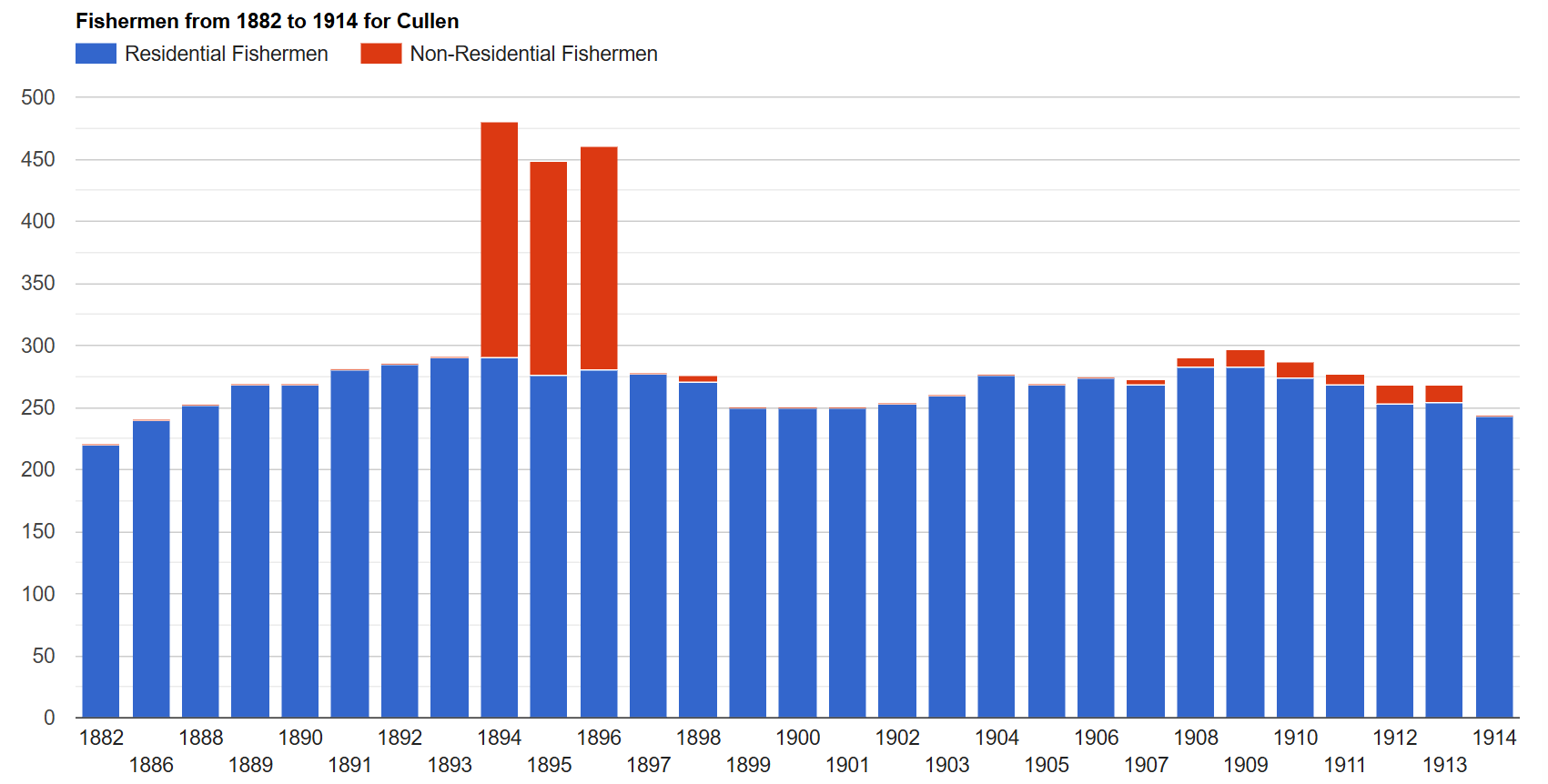
Fishermen

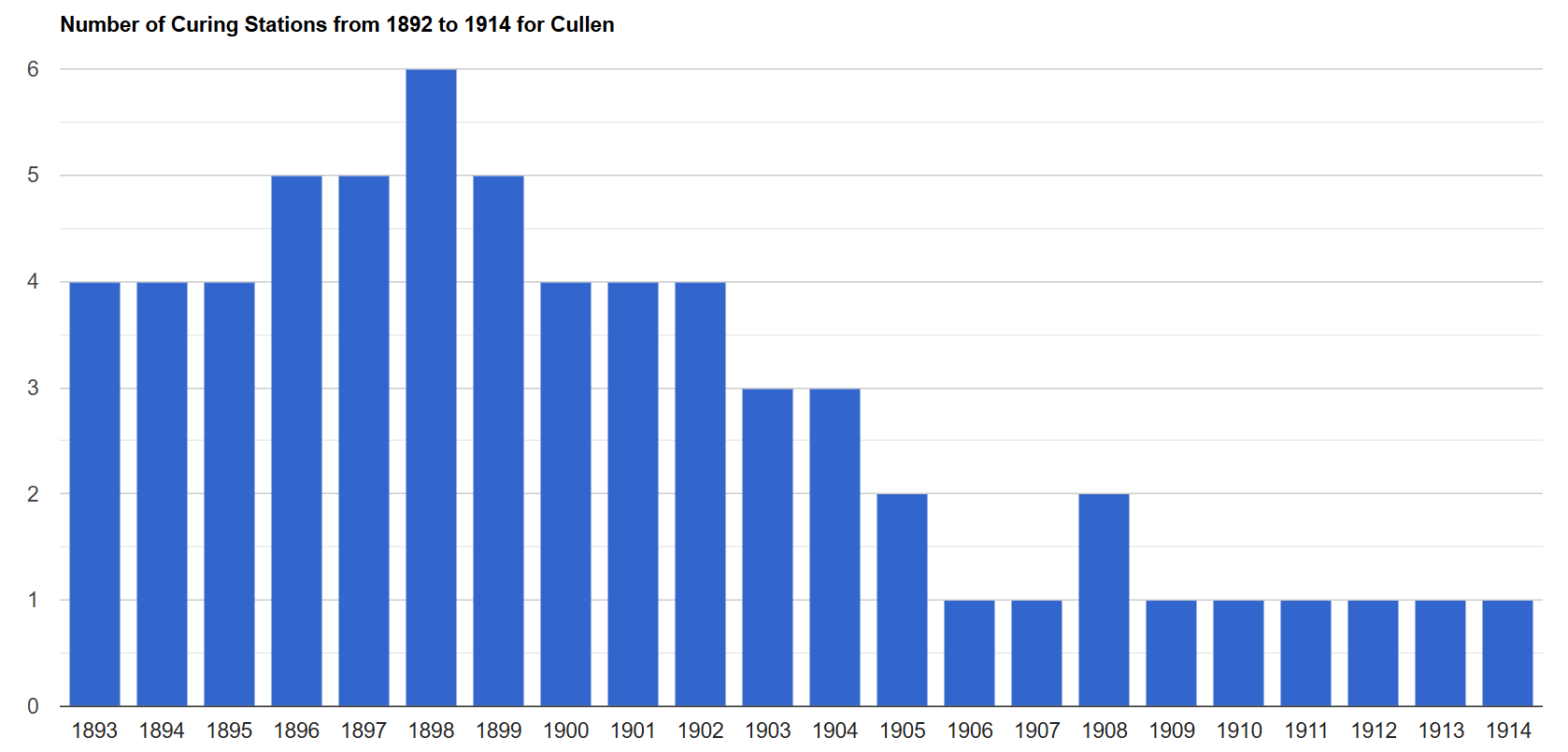
Number of curing stations

== Food ==
The village is noted for Cullen skink which is a traditional soup made from smoked haddock, milk, potato and onion. It hosts the Cullen Skink World Championships competition.

== Demographics ==
In 2001, the village had a population of 1,327.

== Culture ==
Cullen is noticeably busier in summer than winter due to the number of holiday homes owned. The village has a beach and golf course. The 1,086-foot (331-metre) Bin Hill (or Bin of Cullen) is a nearby hill with an associated footpath.

== Notable people ==
Brothers Mike Sandison (born 1971) and Marcus Eoin (born 1973) of the group Boards of Canada were born and raised in Cullen.
