= Wedding of Princess Alexandra and Angus Ogilvy =

1963 British royal wedding

- Princess Alexandra and Angus Ogilvy outside Westminster Abbey after their wedding
- Date: 24 April 1963; 63 years ago
- Venue: Westminster Abbey
- Location: London, England
- Participants: Princess Alexandra of Kent; The Hon. Angus Ogilvy; Members of the British royal family; Other participants

The wedding of Princess Alexandra of Kent and The Honourable Angus Ogilvy took place on Wednesday, 24 April 1963 at Westminster Abbey. Princess Alexandra was the only daughter and second child of Prince George, Duke of Kent, and Princess Marina of Greece and Denmark, while Ogilvy was the second son and fifth child of the 12th Earl of Airlie and Lady Alexandra Coke.

The wedding was a traditional Anglican wedding service according to the Book of Common Prayer. Eric Abbott, Dean of Westminster, presided at the service, and Michael Ramsey, Archbishop of Canterbury, conducted the marriage. Notable figures in attendance included many members of other royal families, national figures and members of the bride's and groom's families. A reception was held afterwards at St James's Palace.

The wedding was watched by an estimated television audience of 200 million people.

== Engagement ==
Princess Alexandra of Kent, a granddaughter of King George V, first met businessman Angus Ogilvy, son of the 12th Earl of Airlie, at a ball at Luton Hoo, the Bedfordshire home of her cousin Lady Zia Wernher. Ogilvy's grandmother Mabell, Countess of Airlie had been a friend and Lady of the Bedchamber to Alexandra's grandmother Queen Mary. Throughout their eight-year courtship, the pair often met at Cluniemore, the Perthshire home of Lady Zia's daughter Myra Butter.

Princess Marina announced the engagement of her daughter Princess Alexandra of Kent to The Hon. Angus Ogilvy on 19 November 1962 at Kensington Palace. Ogilvy presented Alexandra with an engagement ring made of a cabochon sapphire set in gold and surrounded by diamonds on both sides. The Queen gave her consent to the union on 19 December 1962.

On 22 April, two nights before the wedding, the Queen hosted a white-tie ball for 2000 guests at Windsor Castle. Ogilvy had a set of diamond and turquoise flowers the Princess had worn throughout her youth turned into a larger tiara and presented it along with a coordinating pair of earrings and copy of Queen Victoria's Golden Jubilee Necklace from the jeweller Collingwood to his bride.

== Wedding ==
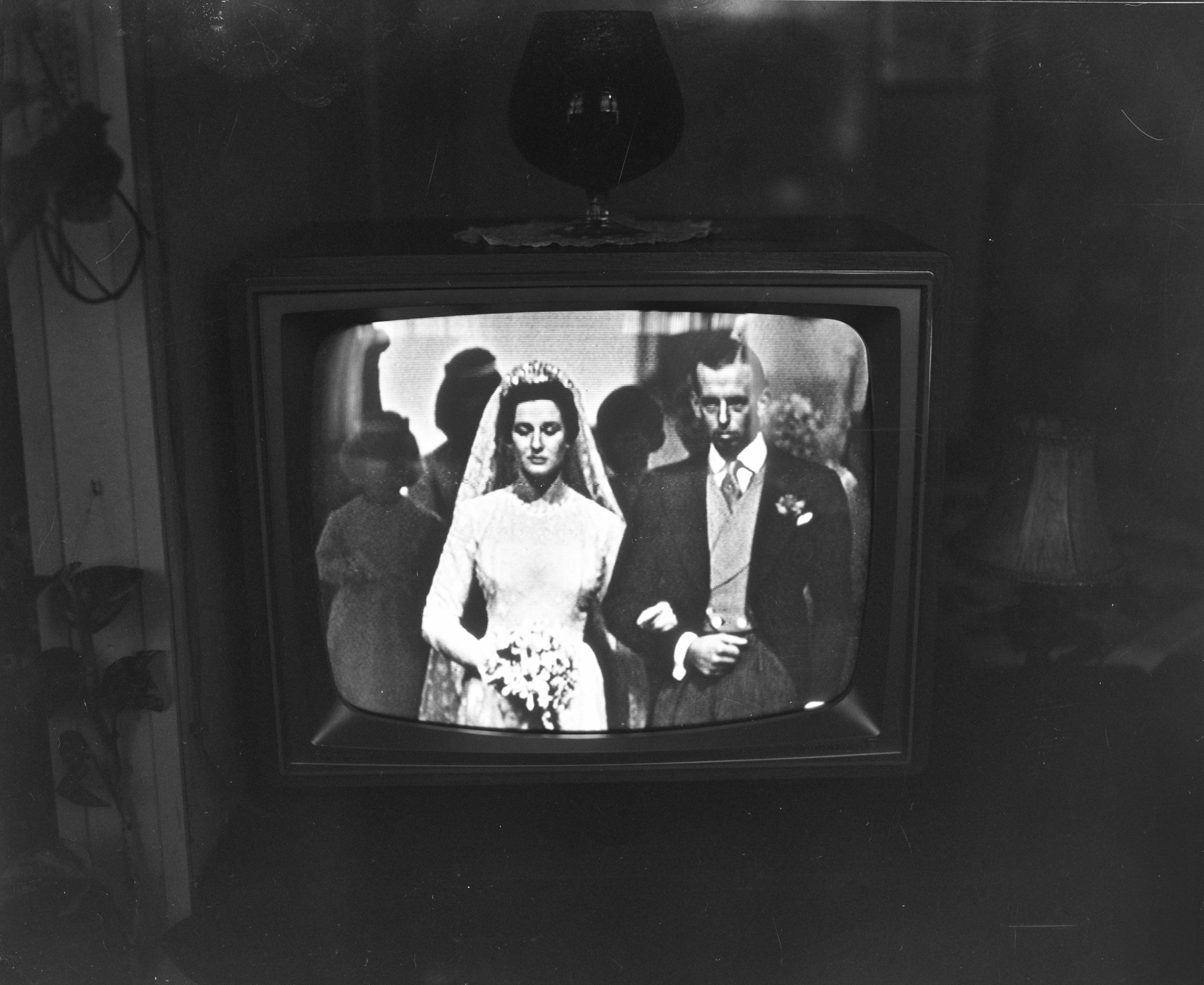
Princess Alexandra arrives at Westminster Abbey on the arm of her brother, the Duke of Kent

External videos
- Royal Spring Wedding of Princess Alexandra (1963) (external video)

The wedding was held on Wednesday, 24 April 1963 at 12:00 BST at Westminster Abbey. Alexandra became the 12th member of the royal family to be married in the Abbey.

The traditional Anglican wedding service was conducted according to the Book of Common Prayer by Eric Abbott, Dean of Westminster, and Michael Ramsey, Archbishop of Canterbury.

After the service, the newlyweds travelled in the Glass Coach to St. James's Palace for the wedding breakfast. The couple honeymooned at Birkhall on the Balmoral estate.

=== Music ===
Prior to the service, the organist of the Abbey played pieces by Johann Sebastian Bach, George Frederic Handel, Herbert Howells and William Henry Harris. Princess Alexandra walked down the aisle on the arm of her brother, The Duke of Kent, to the hymn Holy, Holy, Holy. Throughout the service, the hymns God be in my head, and in my understanding and Love Divine, All Loves Excelling were sung. The National Anthem was sung, and during the signing of the register, anthems by Christopher Tye, Thomas Weelkes, and Handel were sung. The newlywed couple recessed to Charles-Marie Widor's "Toccata" from Symphony for Organ No. 5 and William Walton's Crown Imperial.

=== Clothing ===
The bride wore a wedding dress of Valenciennes lace, with matching veil and train, designed by John Cavanagh. The lace had to be made in France, with special customs arrangements being made so that the press was not notified of its arrival in Britain. The wedding dress included a piece of lace from the bride's late grandmother, Princess Nicholas of Greece and Denmark, and the veil worn by Lady Patricia Ramsey at her own wedding in 1919. She wore the diamond fringe tiara given to her mother by the City of London as a wedding gift in 1934. The bridegroom wore morning dress. The train of her wedding dress was twenty feet long.

The Queen wore an eau-de-nil dress with a matching three-quarter sleeves chiffon overcoat by Norman Hartnell and a hat by Simone Mirman. In 2016, The Queen's ensemble was on display during the exhibition "Fashioning a Reign" to celebrate her 90th birthday.

=== Attendants ===
The royal couple had seven bridal attendants. The Hon. David Ogilvy, son of Lord Ogilvy, thus the groom's nephew, and Simon Hay, son of courtiers Lady Margaret and Sir Alan Hay and great-grandson of the 6th Marquess of Hertford, were page boys. Princess Alexandra was attended by five bridesmaids: Princess Anne, daughter of Queen Elizabeth II and Prince Philip, thus the bride's paternal first cousin once removed and maternal second cousin; Archduchess Elisabeth of Austria, granddaughter of Princess Elizabeth of Greece and Denmark, thus the bride's maternal first cousin once removed; The Hon. Doune Ogilvy, daughter of Lord Ogilvy, thus the groom's niece; Georgina Butter, daughter of Myra Butter, thus the bride's maternal fourth cousin and also her goddaughter; and Emma Tennant, daughter of Lady Margaret and Iain Tennant, thus the groom's niece.

Ogilvy's best man was the Hon. Peregrine Fairfax, second son of the 12th Lord Fairfax of Cameron.

== Guests ==
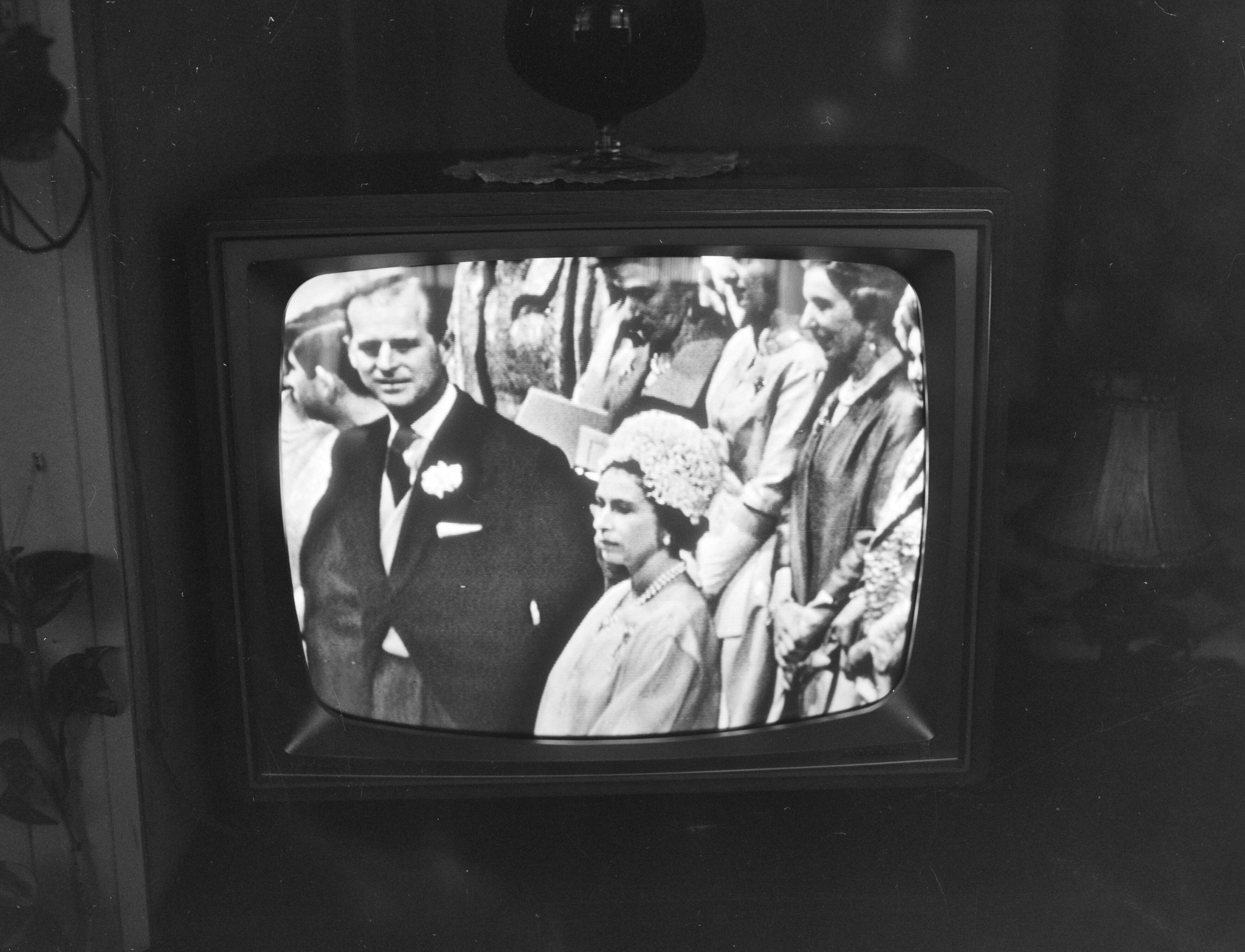
Queen Elizabeth II and Prince Philip, Duke of Edinburgh, at the wedding

Princess Alexandra and Angus Ogvily were married in front of a congregation of 2000 guests. Notable guests in attendance included:

=== Relatives of the bride ===
==== British royal family ====
- Princess Marina, Duchess of Kent, the bride's mother
  - The Duke and Duchess of Kent, the bride's brother and sister-in-law
  - Prince Michael of Kent, the bride's brother
- Queen Elizabeth the Queen Mother, the bride's paternal aunt by marriage
  - The Queen and the Duke of Edinburgh, the bride's paternal first cousin and maternal first cousin once removed
    - The Prince of Wales, the bride's paternal first cousin once removed and maternal second cousin
    - The Princess Anne, the bride's paternal first cousin once removed and maternal second cousin
  - The Princess Margaret, Countess of Snowdon and the Earl of Snowdon, the bride's paternal first cousin and her husband
- The Princess Royal, the bride's paternal aunt
  - The Earl and Countess of Harewood, the bride's paternal first cousin and his wife
    - Viscount Lascelles, the bride's paternal first cousin once removed
- The Duke and Duchess of Gloucester, the bride's paternal uncle and aunt
  - Prince William of Gloucester, the bride's paternal first cousin
  - Prince Richard of Gloucester, the bride's paternal first cousin
- Princess Alice, Countess of Athlone, the bride's paternal first cousin twice removed and paternal great-aunt by marriage
- The Earl Mountbatten of Burma, the bride's paternal second cousin once removed

=== Relatives of the groom ===
==== Ogilvy family ====
- The Earl and Countess of Airlie, the groom's parents
  - The Lady and Lord Lloyd, the groom's sister and brother-in-law
  - Lady Margaret and Iain Tennant, the groom's sister and brother-in-law
    - Miss Emma Tennant, the bridegroom's niece
  - Lady Griselda and Major Peter Balfour, the groom's sister and brother-in-law
  - Lord and Lady Ogilvy, the groom's brother and sister-in-law
    - The Hon. Doune Ogvily, the groom's niece
    - The Master of Ogilvy, the groom's nephew
  - The Hon. James and Mrs Ogilvy, the groom's brother and sister-in-law

=== Other royal guests ===
- The Queen of Denmark, the bride's paternal second cousin once removed
  - Princess Anne-Marie of Denmark, the bride's paternal and maternal third cousin
- (Kingdom of Greece) The Queen of the Hellenes, the bride's maternal and paternal second cousin once removed, and wife of her first cousin, once removed
  - (Kingdom of Greece) The Crown Prince of Greece, the bride's maternal second cousin
  - (Kingdom of Greece) Princess Irene of Greece and Denmark, the bride's maternal second cousin
- Princess Irene of the Netherlands, the bride's maternal second cousin once removed
- Princess Margriet of the Netherlands the bride's maternal second cousin once removed
- The King of Norway, the bride's paternal first cousin once removed
  - The Crown Prince of Norway, the bride's paternal second cousin
- The Queen of Sweden, the bride's paternal second cousin once removed
  - Princess Margaretha of Sweden, the bride's paternal third cousin
  - Princess Désirée of Sweden, the bride's paternal third cousin
- The Margrave and Margravine of Baden, the bride's double second cousin once removed and the bride's maternal first cousin once removed
  - Prince Ludwig of Baden, the bride's maternal second cousin
- Prince and Princess George William of Hanover, the bride's double second cousin once removed and the bride's maternal first cousin once removed
  - Princess Clarissa of Hesse, the bride's maternal second cousin
- The Prince and Princess of Hesse and by Rhine, the bride's paternal second cousin once removed and his wife
- The Princess of Hohenlohe-Langenburg, the bride's maternal first cousin once removed
  - Princess Beatrix of Hohenlohe-Langenburg, the bride's maternal second cousin
  - Prince Rupprecht of Hohenlohe-Langenburg, the bride's maternal second cousin
- The Duchess of Aosta, the bride's maternal first cousin once removed
- King Umberto II of Italy, the bride's paternal seventh cousin once removed
- Queen Victoria Eugenie of Spain, the bride's paternal first cousin twice removed
  - The Prince and Princess of Asturias, the bride's paternal third cousin and the bride's maternal second cousin
- Queen Mother Helen of Romania, the bride's maternal first cousin once removed
- Princess and Prince Paul of Yugoslavia, the bride's maternal aunt and uncle
  - Prince Alexander of Yugoslavia, the bride's maternal first cousin
- The Duke of Bourbon and Burgundy, the bride's paternal third cousin and the bride's maternal second cousin

=== Other notable guests ===
- Harold Macmillan, Prime Minister of the United Kingdom, and Lady Dorothy Macmillan
- R. A. Butler, First Secretary of State, and Mrs Butler
- Duncan Sandys, Secretary of State for the Colonies, and Mrs Sandys
- The Earl of Home, Foreign Secretary, and the Countess of Home
- The Earl and Countess Attlee, former Prime Minister and his wife
- The Earl and Countess of Avon, former Prime Minister and his wife
- Lady Churchill, wife of former Prime Minister Sir Winston Churchill
- The Lord and Lady Fisher of Lambeth, former Archbishop of Canterbury and his wife

== Aftermath ==
After the ceremony, Alexandra and Angus left the Abbey in the Glass Coach for the reception at St James's Palace. The couple honeymooned on the Balmoral estate. They had two children, James (born 1964) and Marina (born 1966). They remained married until Ogilvy's death on 26 December 2004 at the age of 76.
