= David Ogilvy, 10th Earl of Airlie =

Scottish nobleman (1826–1881)

The Right Honourable The Earl of Airlie KT
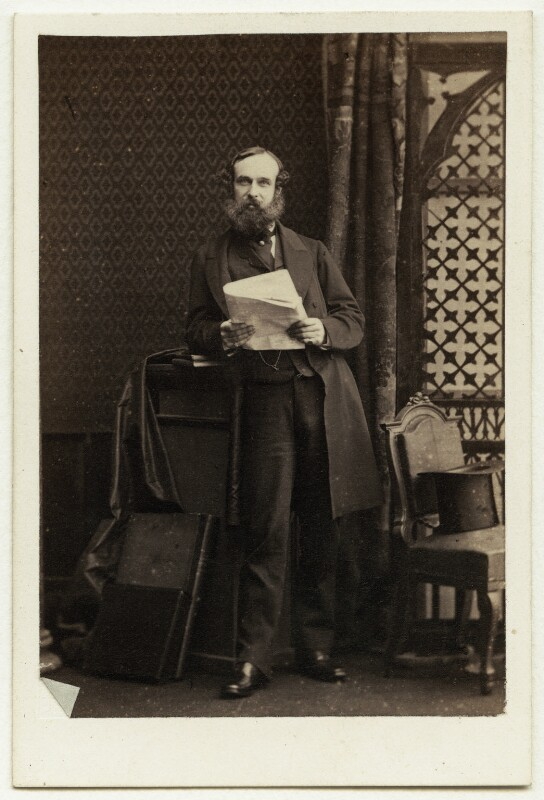
- Photograph of David Ogivly by Camille Silvy

Lord High Commissioner to the General Assembly of the Church of Scotland
- In office 1872–1873
- Preceded by: The 10th Earl of Stair
- Succeeded by: The Earl of Rosslyn

Personal details
- Born: David Graham Drummond Ogilvy; 4 May 1826 London, England
- Died: 25 September 1881 (aged 55) Denver, Colorado, U.S.
- Spouse: Henrietta Blanche Stanley (m. 1851)
- Children: Lady Henrietta Blanche Hozier; Clementine Freeman-Mitford, Lady Redesdale; David Ogilvy, 11th Earl of Airlie; Lady Maude Whyte; Hon. Lyulph Ogilvy; Lady Griselda Cheape
- Parent(s): David Ogilvy, 9th Earl of Airlie; Clementina Drummond
- Education: Christ Church, Oxford
- Occupation: Scottish peer, soldier and rancher

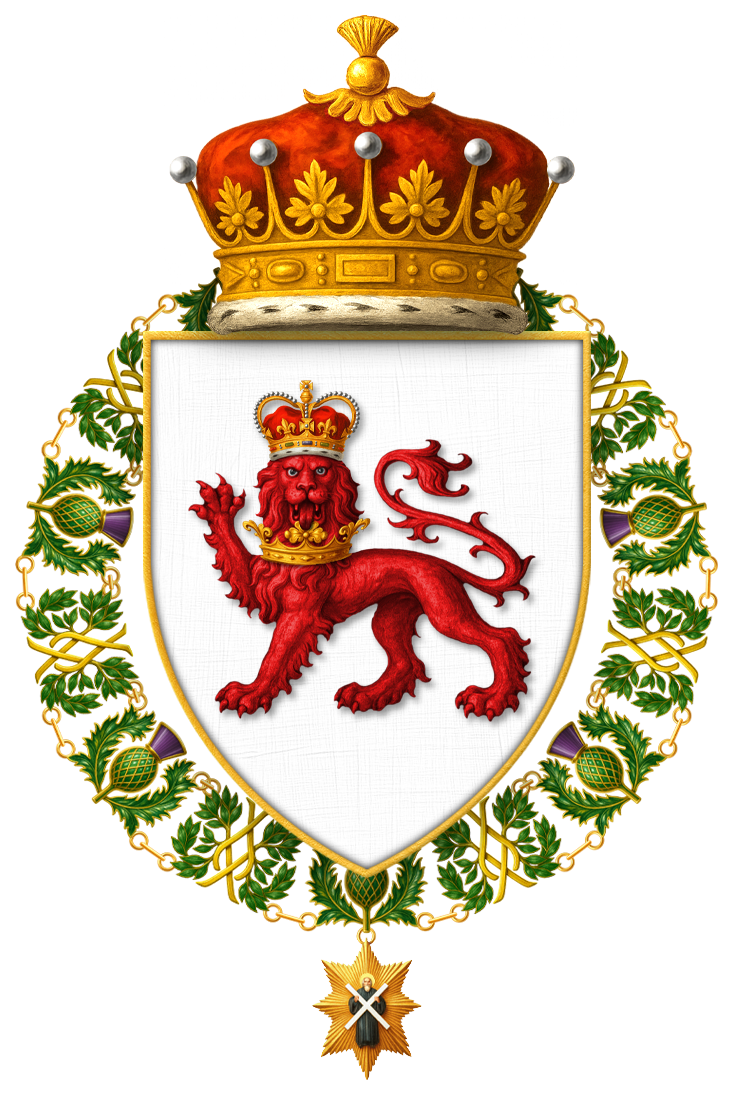
Shield of Arms of David Graham Drummond Ogilvy, 10th Earl of Airlie, KT

David Graham Drummond Ogilvy, 10th Earl of Airlie (4 May 1826 – 25 September 1881), styled Lord Ogilvy from birth until 1849, was a Scottish nobleman, soldier and rancher in Colorado.

== Background and education ==
Born in London in 1826, he was the second (but eldest surviving) son of David Ogilvy, 9th Earl of Airlie, and his first wife, Clementine, daughter of Gavin Drummond. Ogilvy was educated at Christ Church, Oxford, where he graduated with a BA in 1847. Two years later, he succeeded his father as earl. In 1879, Ogilvy received an Honorary LLD by the University of Glasgow.

== Career ==
Ogilvy became a Deputy Lieutenant for Forfarshire in 1847. He was elected a Scottish representative peer to the House of Lords in 1850 and served as captain of the Forfarshire Yeomanry Cavalry and the 12th Forfarshire Rifle Volunteers from 1856. Ogilvy was invested as a Knight of the Order of the Thistle in 1862. In 1872, he was appointed Lord High Commissioner to the General Assembly of the Church of Scotland, an office he held until the following year. He was a founder and served as first President of the Girls' Public Day School Company.

== Private life ==
On 23 September 1851, Airlie married Hon. (Henrietta) Blanche Stanley (30 July 1830 – 5 January 1921), second daughter of Edward Stanley, 2nd Baron Stanley of Alderley, and his wife, Henrietta Dillon-Lee, at Alderley, Cheshire, and had by her two sons and four daughters.

- Lady (Henrietta) Blanche Ogilvy (8 November 1852 – 23 March 1925); married Col. Sir Henry Montague Hozier and had issue, including Clementine Ogilvy Hozier, the wife of Winston Churchill.
- Lady Clementine Gertrude Helen Ogilvy (19 June 1854 – 30 April 1932); married Bertram Mitford (created Baron Redesdale in 1902), and had issue; they were the grandparents of the Mitford sisters.
- Lt.-Col. David Stanley William Ogilvy, 11th Earl of Airlie (20 January 1856 – 11 June 1900, killed in action in the Boer War); married Lady Mabell Gore, and had issue; they were grandparents of Sir Angus Ogilvy, who married Princess Alexandra of Kent.
- Lady Maude Josepha Ogilvy (16 November 1859 – 3 April 1933); married Theodore Whyte, and had issue.
- Lyulph Gilchrist Stanley Ogilvy (25 June 1861 – April 1947); married Edith Boothroyd, in Colorado, USA, and had issue.
- Lady Griselda Johanna Helen Ogilvy (20 December 1865 – 12 February 1934); married James Cheape, and had issue.

Ogilvy died in Denver, Colorado, in 1881 and was succeeded in his titles by his older son, David.

== See also ==
- Airlie, Oregon

Peerage of Scotland
Preceded by David Ogilvy	Earl of Airlie; 1849–1881	Succeeded by David Ogilvy
