= Thomas Swinburne =

Thomas Swinburne may refer to:

- Thomas Robert Swinburne (1794–1864), British military administrator
- Thomas Thackeray Swinburne (1865–1926), American poet
