= Cheape =

Cheape is a surname. Notable people with the surname include:

- Eric Cheape (1885–1973), American college football player
- John Cheape (1792–1875), Scottish general
- Lady Griselda Cheape (1865–1934), anti-suffrage campaigner
- Leslie Cheape (1882–1916), English soldier and polo player
