= David Ogilvy, 13th Earl of Airlie =

Scottish banker and peer (1926–2023)

The Right Honourable The Earl of Airlie KT GCVO PC JP

Chancellor of the Order of the Thistle
- In office 13 November 2007 – 26 June 2023
- Monarchs: Elizabeth II; Charles III
- Preceded by: The Duke of Buccleuch and Queensberry
- Succeeded by: The Duke of Buccleuch and Queensberry

Lord Chamberlain of the Household
- In office 1984–1997
- Monarch: Elizabeth II
- Preceded by: The Lord Maclean
- Succeeded by: The Lord Camoys

Lord Lieutenant of Angus
- In office 1989–2001
- Monarch: Elizabeth II
- Preceded by: The Earl of Dalhousie
- Succeeded by: Georgiana Osborne

Member of the House of Lords Lord Temporal
- In office 28 December 1968 – 11 November 1999 as a hereditary peer
- Preceded by: The 12th Earl of Airlie
- Succeeded by: Seat abolished

Personal details
- Born: David George Coke Patrick Ogilvy; 17 May 1926 Westminster, London, England
- Died: 26 June 2023 (aged 97) London, England
- Spouse: Virginia Fortune Ryan (m. 1952)
- Children: 6
- Parent(s): David Ogilvy, 12th Earl of Airlie; Lady Alexandra Coke
- Military career
- Allegiance: United Kingdom
- Branch: British Army
- Service years: 1945–1950
- Rank: Captain
- Service number: 339585
- Unit: Scots Guards
- Conflicts: World War II

David George Coke Patrick Ogilvy, 13th Earl of Airlie, KT, GCVO, PC, JP (17 May 1926 – 26 June 2023) was a Scottish landowner, soldier, banker and peer.

Airlie served as Lord Chamberlain of the Household from 1984 until 1997, as well as in a number of honorary positions such as Chancellor of the Order of the Thistle and Lord Lieutenant of Angus. He was the brother-in-law of Princess Alexandra, The Honourable Lady Ogilvy.

== Early life and ancestry ==
Airlie was born David George Coke Patrick Ogilvy in Westminster on 17 May 1926. He was the eldest son of the 12th Earl of Airlie and his wife Lady Alexandra Marie Bridget Coke (1891–1984), herself the daughter of 3rd Earl of Leicester. King George V was his godfather. His younger brother was The Hon. Sir Angus Ogilvy, husband of Princess Alexandra of Kent. He served as a page to his father at the coronation of King George VI and Queen Elizabeth in Westminster Abbey on 12 May 1937. After the death of Queen Elizabeth II, his childhood friend, on 8 September 2022, he was the last surviving participant in that coronation.

Airlie, then styled Lord Ogilvy by courtesy, was educated at Eton College. He served with the Scots Guards in Germany, Malaya and Austria. In 1946, he was appointed aide-de-camp to the commander-in-chief and High Commissioner to Austria. He left the army in 1950 to attend the Royal Agricultural College to learn more about estate management. He maintained two homes on the family's 69,000 acres (280 km^{2}) estate in Angus: Cortachy Castle and Airlie Castle. He also had a home at Sloane Court West in Chelsea, London, where at the time of his death he lived full-time.

== Career ==
=== Merchant banking ===
In 1953, then Lord Ogilvy took up merchant banking, joining J. Henry Schroder & Co. He was appointed a director of the company in 1961, chairman of Henry Schroder Wagg & Co. in 1973, and then of Schroders plc in 1977.

He became the 13th Earl of Airlie and chief of Clan Ogilvy upon the death of his father in 1968. In 1972, Lord Airlie was named to the International Best Dressed Hall of Fame List.

=== Royal Household ===
In 1984, Lord Airlie resigned from Schroder to take up the position of Lord Chamberlain of the Household, the most senior office in the Royal Household. He was sworn into the Privy Council and appointed a Knight Grand Cross of the Royal Victorian Order. In his capacity as Lord Chamberlain, he was chancellor of the Royal Victorian Order. He was following in the footsteps of his late father, who had served as Lord Chamberlain of Queen Elizabeth the Queen Mother's household.

Under Lord Airlie, the Lord Chamberlain's ceremonial and non-executive role was altered to that of chief executive. Airlie initiated changes in the early 1990s under the auspices of "The Way Ahead Group". Under these plans the Queen agreed to pay tax, greater transparency for the public subsidy of the monarchy began and a greater emphasis on public relations started. In 1986, he produced a 1,393-page report recommending 188 changes for smoother operations of the Royal Household.

On 29 November 1985, Airlie was made a Knight of the Order of the Thistle, Scotland's highest order of chivalry. He became Chairman of General Accident Fire and Life Assurance plc in 1987. In 1989, he was appointed Lord Lieutenant of Angus, having been a deputy lieutenant since 1964.

Airlie's tenure as Lord Chamberlain saw times of turbulence for the monarchy, including Queen Elizabeth II's annus horribilis, with the 1992 Windsor Castle fire and the separations and subsequent divorces of the Prince and Princess of Wales and the Duke and Duchess of York, and the death of Diana, Princess of Wales, in August 1997. He remained in the post until 1997; upon his retirement, he was awarded the Royal Victorian Chain and appointed a permanent lord-in-waiting.

== Later life ==
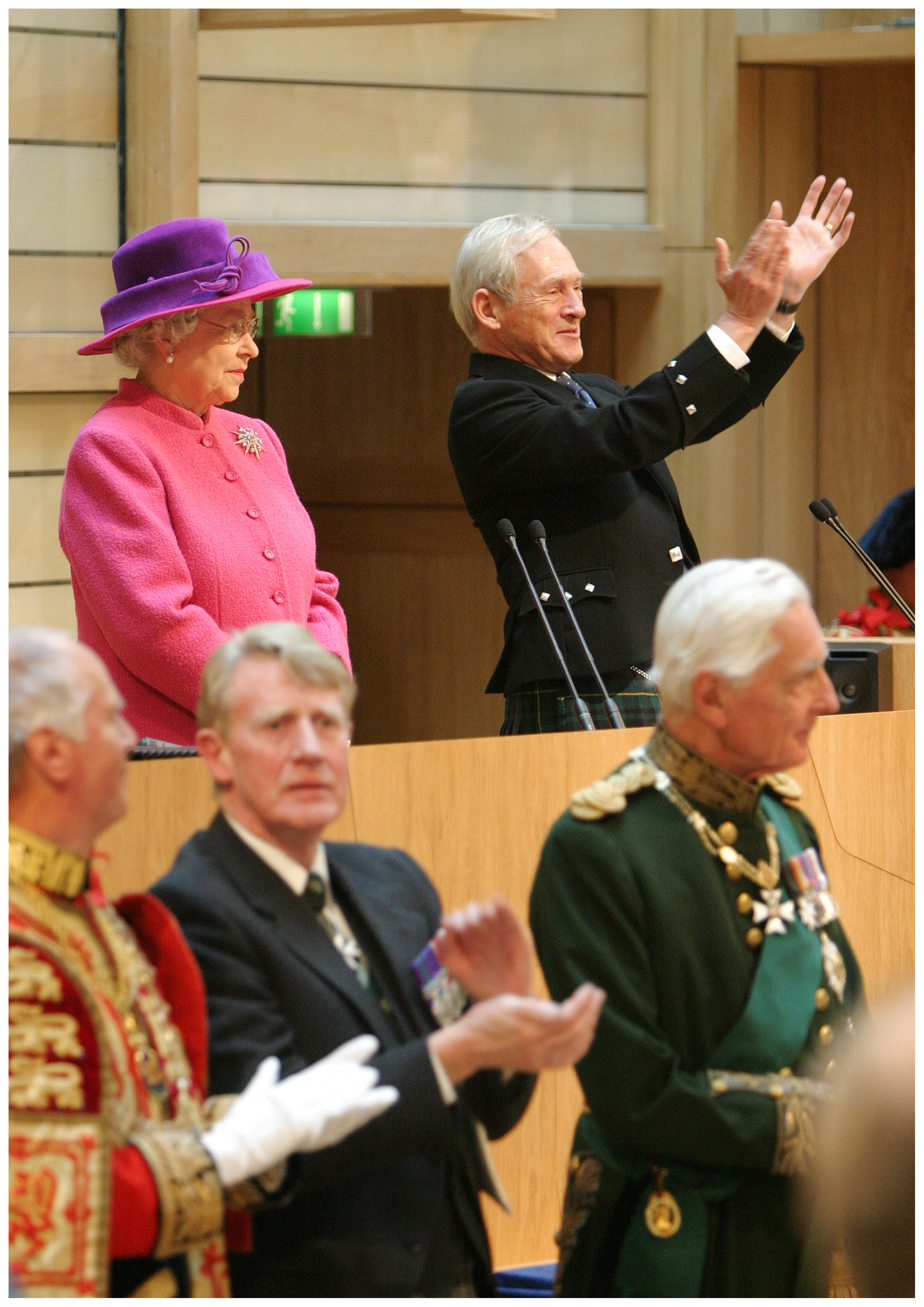
Airlie, front right, as Captain General of the Royal Company of Archers at the opening of the new Scottish Parliament building, October 2004

Lord Airlie's ancestral home in Tayside was Cortachy Castle near the ancient burgh of Kirriemuir, Angus. The castle has served as the family home for more than 500 years. However, in 2014, Lord and Lady Airlie moved out of Cortachy Castle, and their eldest son, who now manages the property, is considering the future of the residence. On 13 November 2007, Airlie was appointed Chancellor of the Order of the Thistle following the death of the 9th Duke of Buccleuch. He remained in this position until his death.

When the University of Abertay Dundee was founded in 1994, Airlie was appointed their first chancellor. He was additionally, the Captain-General of the Royal Company of Archers, The Queen's Bodyguard for Scotland, a ceremonial unit that serves as the sovereign's bodyguard in Scotland, and thus Gold Stick for Scotland.

In September 2022, Lord Airlie attended the state funeral of Queen Elizabeth II. In May 2023, he was present at the coronation of King Charles III and Queen Camilla. Hugo Vickers has pointed out that Lord Airlie was the last surviving man to attend three coronations – 1937, 1953 and 2023.

Lord Airlie died at home in London, on 26 June 2023, at the age of 97. His funeral was held on 6 July 2023 at Cortachy Castle. Per his request, representatives from Scouts Scotland, of which he was president, were present during his funeral and lined the street as his coffin was transported to the local Cortachy cemetery for interment. A memorial service was held on 15 November 2023 in the Chapel of the Royal Hospital Chelsea and was attended by King Charles III and Queen Camilla.

== Personal life ==
On 23 October 1952, he married Virginia Fortune Ryan at St Margaret's Church, Westminster, in the presence of Queen Elizabeth the Queen Mother and Princess Margaret.

They had six children:

- Lady Doune Mabell Ogilvy (born 13 August 1953); married Hereward Charles Wake, on 16 April 1977, had issue, divorced in July 1995.
- Lady Jane Fortune Margaret Ogilvy (born 24 June 1955); married François Nairac on 30 August 1980, had issue.
- David John Ogilvy, 14th Earl of Airlie (born 9 March 1958); married, firstly, The Hon. Geraldine Harmsworth (daughter of the 3rd Viscount Rothermere) in 1981, had issue, divorced in 1990. Married, secondly, Tarka Kings in 1991, had issue.
  - Lady Augusta Amadeus Caroline Ogilvy (born 1981)
  - David Huxley Ogilvy, Lord Ogilvy (born 1991)
  - The Hon. Joseph Skene Ogilvy (born 1995)
  - The Hon. Michael Móir Ogilvy (born 1997)
- The Hon. Bruce Patrick Mark Ogilvy (born 7 April 1959)
- Lady Elizabeth Clementina Ogilvy (born 4 June 1965); married Jonathan Baring, had issue.
- The Hon. Patrick Alexander Ogilvy (born 24 March 1971)

His wife, the Countess of Airlie, was a Lady of the Bedchamber to Queen Elizabeth II, following in the footsteps of his grandmother, Mabell, Countess of Airlie, who was a Lady of the Bedchamber to Queen Mary. She was the first American to be appointed a lady-in-waiting.

== In popular culture ==
Lord Airlie was portrayed by actor Douglas Reith in the 2006 film The Queen in his capacity as Lord Chamberlain, planning the funeral of Diana, Princess of Wales. He was portrayed by actor Martin Turner in the fifth season of The Crown in which he was depicted managing the divorce of the Prince (Dominic West) and Princess of Wales (Elizabeth Debicki). He was again portrayed by Turner in the sixth season of the series, planning Diana's funeral and for Operation London Bridge.

== Honours and arms ==
Ribbon bar of David Ogilvy, 13th Earl of Airlie

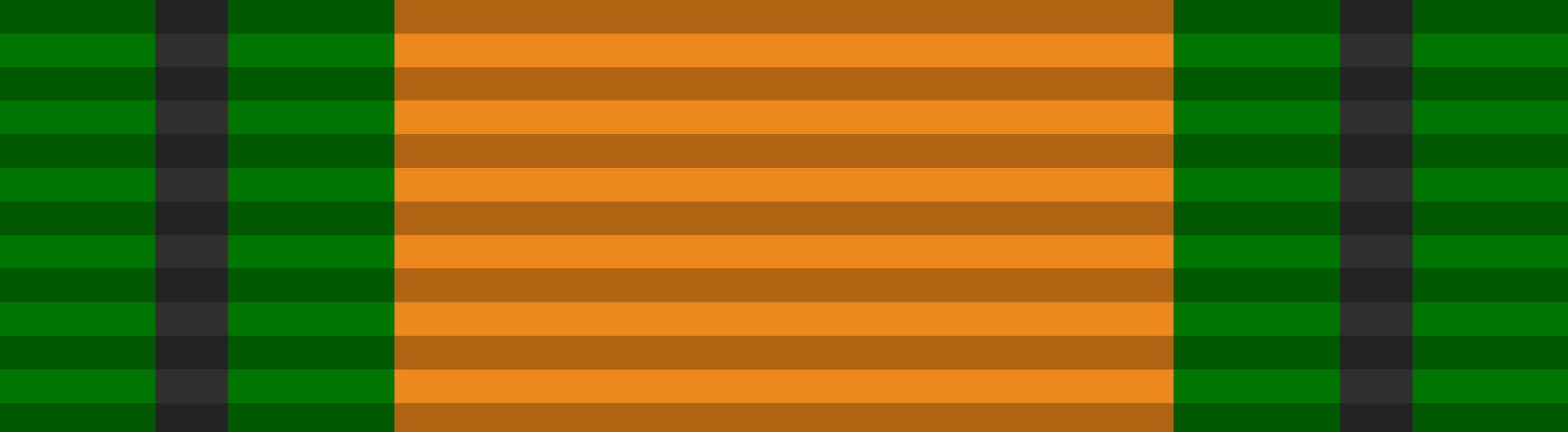

Country	Date	Appointment	Ribbon	Post-nominal letters	Notes
United Kingdom	12 May 1937	King George VI Coronation Medal			
United Kingdom	2 June 1953	Queen Elizabeth II Coronation Medal			
United Kingdom	6 February 1977	Queen Elizabeth II Silver Jubilee Medal			
United Kingdom	11 May 1981	Officer of the Most Venerable Order of the Hospital of Saint John of Jerusalem		OStJ	Promoted to KStJ in 1996
United Kingdom	7 December 1984	Knight Grand Cross of the Royal Victorian Order		GCVO	
Scotland; United Kingdom	29 November 1985	Knight of the Most Ancient and Most Noble Order of the Thistle		KT	
Brunei	1992	Order of the Crown of Brunei, 1st Class		SPMB	
Portugal	27 April 1993	Grand Cross of the Order of Prince Henry		GCIH	
United Kingdom	6 February 1996	Knight of the Most Venerable Order of the Hospital of Saint John of Jerusalem		KStJ	
United Kingdom	19 December 1997	Royal Victorian Chain			
United Kingdom	6 February 2002	Queen Elizabeth II Golden Jubilee Medal			
United Kingdom	6 February 2012	Queen Elizabeth II Diamond Jubilee Medal			
United Kingdom	6 May 2023	King Charles III Coronation Medal			
United Kingdom		Defence Medal			
United Kingdom		War Medal 1939–1945			
United Kingdom		General Service Medal			

=== Arms ===
Coat of arms of David Ogilvy, 13th Earl of Airlie
Coronet A Coronet of an Earl Crest A Lady from the waist upwards, affrontée Azure holding a Portcullis Gules Escutcheon Argent a Lion passant guardant Gules crowned with an Imperial Crown and collared with an open one proper Supporters On either side a Bull Sable, armed and unguled Vert, and gorged with a Garland of Flowers proper Motto A Fin (To the end) Orders Thistle circlet; Previously: Royal Victorian Order circlet

Court offices
Preceded by The Lord Maclean	Lord Chamberlain; 1984–1997	Succeeded by The Lord Camoys
Honorary titles
Preceded by The Earl of Dalhousie	Lord Lieutenant of Angus; 1989–2001	Succeeded by Georgiana Osborne
Preceded by The Duke of Buccleuch	Chancellor of the Order of the Thistle; 2007–2023	Succeeded by The Duke of Buccleuch
Peerage of Scotland
Preceded by David Ogilvy	Earl of Airlie; 1968–2023	Succeeded by David Ogilvy
