= Lord Lieutenant of Angus =

Ceremonial officer in Angus, Scotland

The Lord Lieutenant of Angus, is the British monarch's personal representative in an area which was defined by the Lord-Lieutenants (Scotland) Order 1996 as consisting of the unitary Angus council area, in Scotland.

The lieutenancy area was previously defined by the Lord-Lieutenants (Scotland) Order 1975 as consisting of the Angus district, which was one of three districts of the two-tier Tayside region created by the Local Government (Scotland) Act 1973 and abolished by the Local Government etc (Scotland) Act 1994, which divided the region between the Angus, Dundee City, and Perth and Kinross council areas. Prior to the 1975 order the lieutenancy area was the county of Angus, which was officially the county of Forfar until 1928.

The office was founded in 1794, and has had the following titles:

- His or Her Majesty's Lieutenant in the County of Forfar until 1928
- His or Her Majesty's Lieutenant in the County of Angus 1928 to 1975
- Lord-Lieutenant of Tayside Region, District of Angus 1975 to 1996
- Lord-Lieutenant of Angus since 1996

== List of Lord-Lieutenants of Angus ==
- Archibald Douglas, 1st Baron Douglas 17 March 1794 – 26 December 1827
- David Ogilvy, 9th Earl of Airlie 5 February 1828 – 1849
- Fox Maule-Ramsay, 11th Earl of Dalhousie 13 June 1849 – 6 July 1874
- Claude Bowes-Lyon, 13th Earl of Strathmore and Kinghorne 3 August 1874 – 16 February 1904
- Claude Bowes-Lyon, 14th Earl of Strathmore and Kinghorne 28 July 1904 – 1936
- David Ogilvy, 12th Earl of Airlie 15 June 1936 – 1967
- Simon Ramsay, 16th Earl of Dalhousie 12 June 1967 – 1989
- David Ogilvy, 13th Earl of Airlie 6 November 1989 – 2001
- Georgiana Osborne 24 July 2001 – 24 August 2019
- Patricia Ann Sawers 24 August 2019 – present

== Deputy lieutenants ==
A deputy lieutenant of Angus is commissioned by the Lord Lieutenant of Angus. Deputy lieutenants support the work of the lord-lieutenant. There can be several deputy lieutenants at any time, depending on the population of the county. Their appointment does not terminate with the changing of the lord-lieutenant, but they usually retire at age 75.

=== 19th Century ===
- 10 March 1846: Sir Thomas Monro
- 10 March 1846: David Laird,
- 10 March 1846: Lieutenant General Thomas Robert Swinburne
- 10 March 1846: David William Balfour Ogilvy
- 10 March 1846: David Rankine

== Notes and references ==
- Sainty, J. C. "Lieutenants and Lord-Lieutenants of Counties (Scotland) 1794-".
