= David Ogilvy, 12th Earl of Airlie =

Scottish peer, soldier and courtier (1893–1968)

Colonel The Right Honourable The Earl of Airlie KT GCVO MC
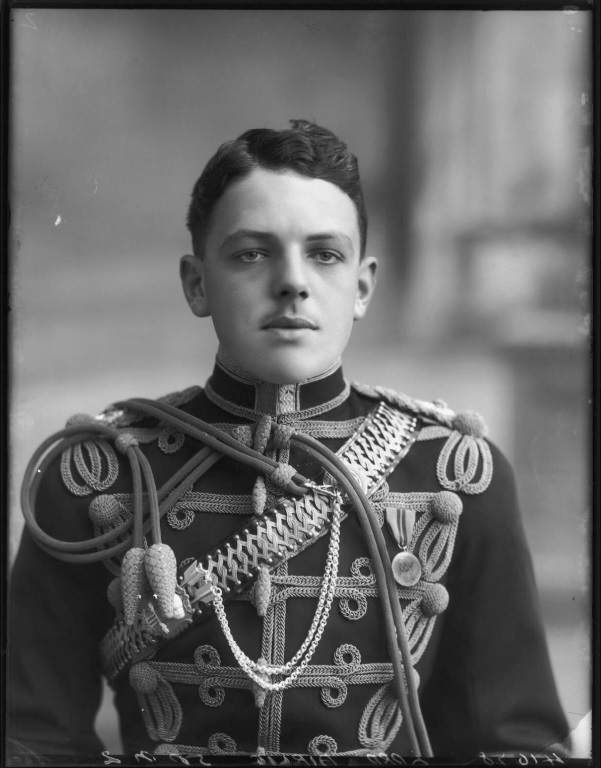
- Lord Airlie in 1912

Personal details
- Born: David Lyulph Gore Wolseley Ogilvy, Lord Ogilvy; 18 July 1893 Cahir, County Tipperary, Ireland
- Died: 28 December 1968 (aged 75) Airlie Castle, Angus, Scotland
- Spouse: Lady Alexandra Coke (m. 1917)
- Children: Victoria Lloyd, Baroness Lloyd; Lady Margaret Tennant; Lady Griselda Balfour; David Ogilvy, 13th Earl of Airlie; Hon. Sir Angus Ogilvy; Hon. James Ogilvy
- Parent(s): David Ogilvy, 11th Earl of Airlie; Lady Mabell Gore
- Occupation: Peer, soldier, courtier

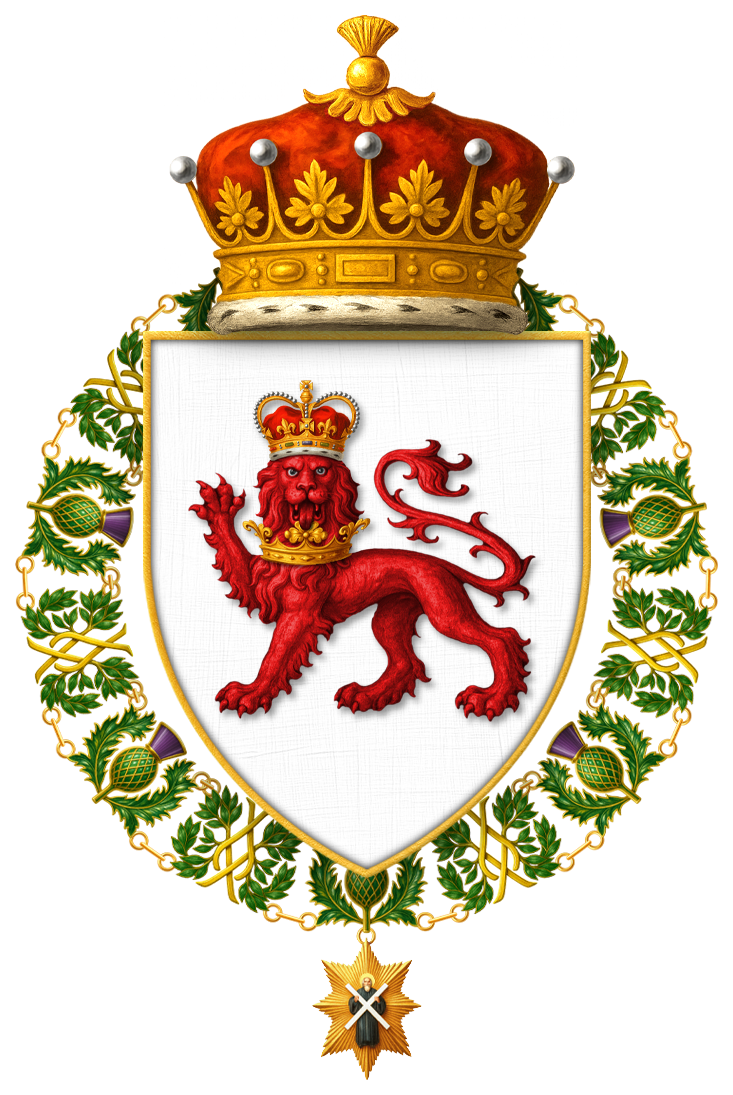
Shield of Arms of David Lyulph Gore Wolseley Ogilvy, 12th Earl of Airlie, KT, GCVO, MC

Colonel David Lyulph Gore Wolseley Ogilvy, 12th Earl of Airlie, KT, GCVO, MC (18 July 1893 – 28 December 1968) was a Scottish peer, soldier and courtier. He was the father-in-law of Princess Alexandra, The Honourable Lady Ogilvy.

== Early life ==
Airlie was born on 18 July 1893 in Cahir, County Tipperary, Ireland. He was the eldest son of David Ogilvy, 11th Earl of Airlie, and his wife, the former Lady Mabell Gore. He inherited his father's titles in 1900 at the age of six when his father died in the Boer War, and was one of the trainbearers to Mary of Teck at her coronation in 1911. Lord Airlie was educated at Eton and the Royal Military College, Sandhurst.

== Career ==
He became a Scottish representative peer in 1922, was appointed a lord-in-waiting in Stanley Baldwin's government in April 1926, and was made a Knight Commander of the Royal Victorian Order on 10 May 1929.

In June 1936, he became Lord Lieutenant of Angus. He was a guest at the 1947 wedding of Princess Elizabeth and Philip Mountbatten, Duke of Edinburgh. He was elevated to Knight Grand Cross of the Royal Victorian Order in 1938, made a Knight of the Order of the Thistle in 1942 and was appointed Chancellor of the Order of the Thistle in 1956.

Lord Airlie owned many racehorses, most notably the steeplechaser Master Robert, "an eleven-year-old Irish-bred horse" that won the 1924 Grand National in the Earl's colours.

=== Military career ===
From the Royal Military College, Sandhurst, in 1912 Airlie was commissioned into the 10th Hussars. He was promoted to the rank of captain during the First World War, in which he won the Military Cross.

He retired from the Regular Army in 1921, but was commissioned into the part-time 5th Battalion (4th/5th Battalion from 1922), Black Watch (Territorial Army) as a major. He was lieutenant-colonel commanding from 1924–29, being promoted colonel in 1928. In 1940 he was commissioned a lieutenant-colonel in the Scots Guards, reverting at his own request to the rank of major until 1942. He resigned his commission in 1948. He was commandant of the Army Cadet Forces, Scotland in 1943. He was awarded the honorary degree of Doctor of Laws (LL.D) by the University of St Andrews in 1958.

== Personal life ==
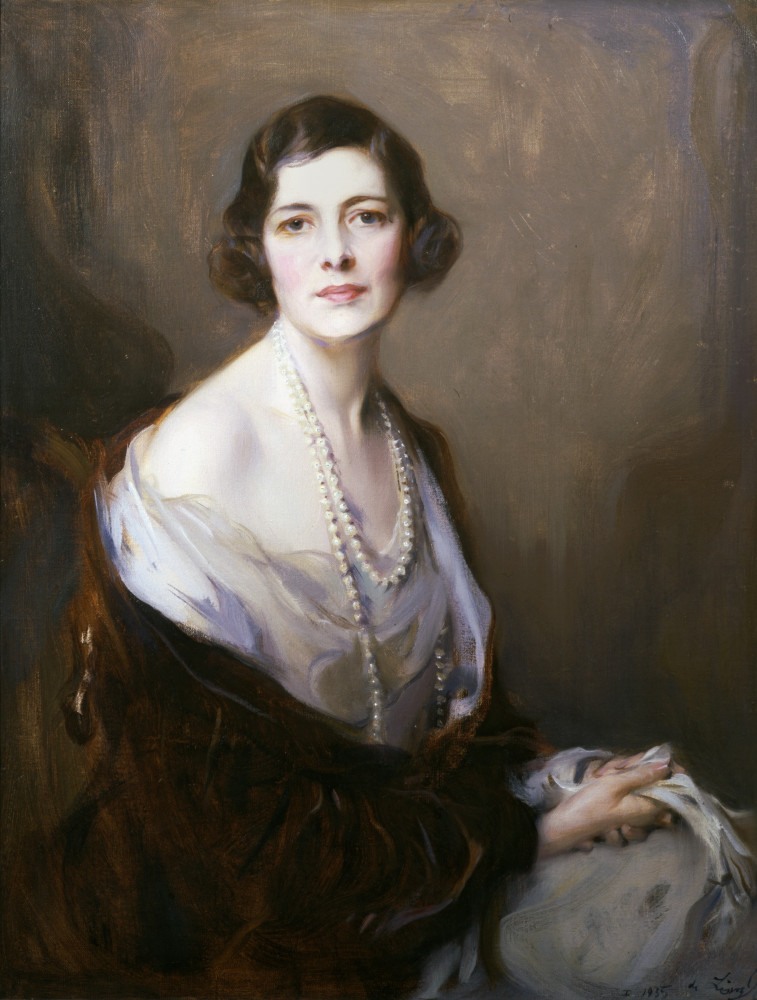
Portrait of the Countess of Airlie, by Philip de László, 1935

On 17 July 1917, Lord Airlie married Lady Alexandra Coke (d. 1984), second daughter of Thomas Coke, 3rd Earl of Leicester, and they had six children.

- Lady Victoria Jean Marjorie Mabell Ogilvy (1918–2004), who married Alexander Lloyd, 2nd Baron Lloyd, in 1942. They had three children.
- Lady Margaret Helen Isla Marion Ogilvy (1920–2014), who married Iain Tennant in 1946. They had three children.
- Lady Griselda Davinia Roberta Ogilvy (1924–1977), who married Maj. Peter Balfour in 1948. Before their divorce in 1968, they had three children.
- David George Coke Patrick Ogilvy, 13th Earl of Airlie (1926–2023), who married Virginia Fortune Ryan in 1952. They had six children.
- The Hon. Sir Angus James Bruce Ogilvy (1928–2004), who married Princess Alexandra of Kent in 1963. They had two children.
- The Hon. James Donald Diarmid Ogilvy (1934–2024), who married Magdalen Jane Ruth Ducas in 1959. Before their divorce in 1980, they had four children. He remarried Lady Caroline Child-Villiers (daughter of the 9th Earl of Jersey) in 1980.

Lord Airlie died on 28 December 1968, at his home, Airlie Castle, Angus, Scotland.

Political offices
Preceded by The Lord Somers	Lord-in-waiting; 1926–1929	Unknown
Court offices
New title	Lord Chamberlain to The Queen; 1937–1965	Succeeded by The Earl of Dalhousie
Honorary titles
Preceded by The Earl of Strathmore and Kinghorne	Lord Lieutenant of Angus; 1936–1967	Succeeded by The Earl of Dalhousie
Preceded by The Lord Elphinstone	Chancellor of the Order of the Thistle; 1956–1966	Succeeded by The Duke of Buccleuch
Peerage of Scotland
Preceded by David Ogilvy	Earl of Airlie; 1900–1968	Succeeded by David Ogilvy
