= David Ogilvy, 11th Earl of Airlie =

Scottish soldier (1856–1900)

The Right Honourable Lieutenant-Colonel The Earl of Airlie DL
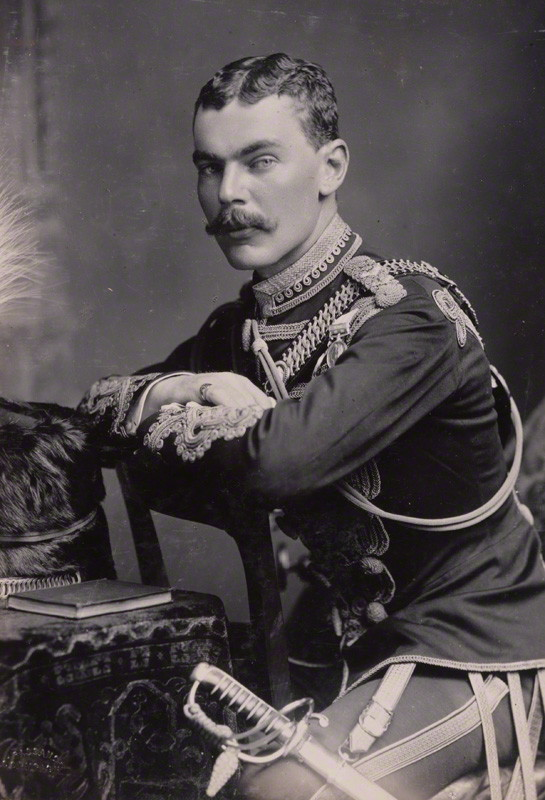
- Lord Airlie in 1883.

Personal details
- Born: David Stanley William Ogilvy; 20 January 1856 Florence, Grand Duchy of Tuscany
- Died: 11 June 1900 (aged 44) Pretoria, South African Republic
- Spouse: Lady Mabell Gore (m. 1886)
- Children: Lady Kitty Ogilvy; Lady Helen Ogilvy; Lady Mabell Ogilvy; David Ogilvy, 12th Earl of Airlie; Hon. Bruce Ogilvy; Hon. Patrick Ogilvy
- Parent(s): David Ogilvy, 10th Earl of Airlie; Hon. Henrietta Stanley
- Occupation: Scottish peer

Lieutenant-Colonel David Stanley William Ogilvy, 11th Earl of Airlie DL (20 January 1856 – 11 June 1900) was a Scottish peer and soldier.

He was born at Florence, Grand Duchy of Tuscany. He was the third child and elder son of David Ogilvy, 10th Earl of Airlie, and The Hon. Henrietta Blanche Stanley.

== Marriage and family ==
On 19 January 1886 he married Lady Mabell Frances Elizabeth Gore, daughter of Arthur Gore, 5th Earl of Arran, and Lady Edith Elizabeth Jocelyn at St George's, Hanover Square, London, England.

They had three sons - the eldest being Colonel David Lyulph Gore Wolseley Ogilvy, 12th Earl of Airlie (18 July 1893 – 28 December 1968) - and three daughters, Helen Alice, Mabel and Kitty Edith Blanche.

== Career ==
David Ogilvy was educated at Eton College and Balliol College, University of Oxford. Between 1874 and 1876 he gained the rank of lieutenant in the services of the 1st Regiment, in the Scots Guards and the 10th Royal Hussars. Between 1878 and 1879 he fought in the Second Anglo-Afghan War. Between 1884 and 1885 he fought in the Sudan and Nile Expedition. Between 1885 and 1900 he held the office of Scottish representative peer.

In 1890 he held the office of Deputy Lieutenant of Forfar. In December 1897 he gained the rank of lieutenant colonel in the service of the 12th Royal Lancers.

In 1899 his regiment was called upon for active service to fight in the Second Boer War. He took part in the Battle of Magersfontein on 10–11 December 1899, in which the defending Boer force defeated the advancing British forces amongst heavy casualties for the latter (mentioned in the despatch from Lord Methuen describing the battle). Taking part in the advance to relieve Kimberley, he was again mentioned in despatches by Lord Roberts (31 March 1900), and for gallantry at Modder River. He was again wounded near Brandfort.

He died aged 44 at the Battle of Diamond Hill, Pretoria, Transvaal, South Africa, killed in action, after leading his regiment in a charge which saved the guns. At his death, the Earldom of Airlie was inherited by his six-year-old son David. The Airlie Monument, which stands on Tulloch Hill, was erected to commemorate his death.

He owned 69,000 acres, mostly in Forfar but also and Perth.

Peerage of Scotland
Preceded by David Graham Drummond Ogilvy	Earl of Airlie; 1881–1900	Succeeded by David Lyulph Gore Wolseley Ogilvy
