= David Ogilvy, 9th Earl of Airlie =

Scottish peer

The Right Honourable The Earl of Airlie
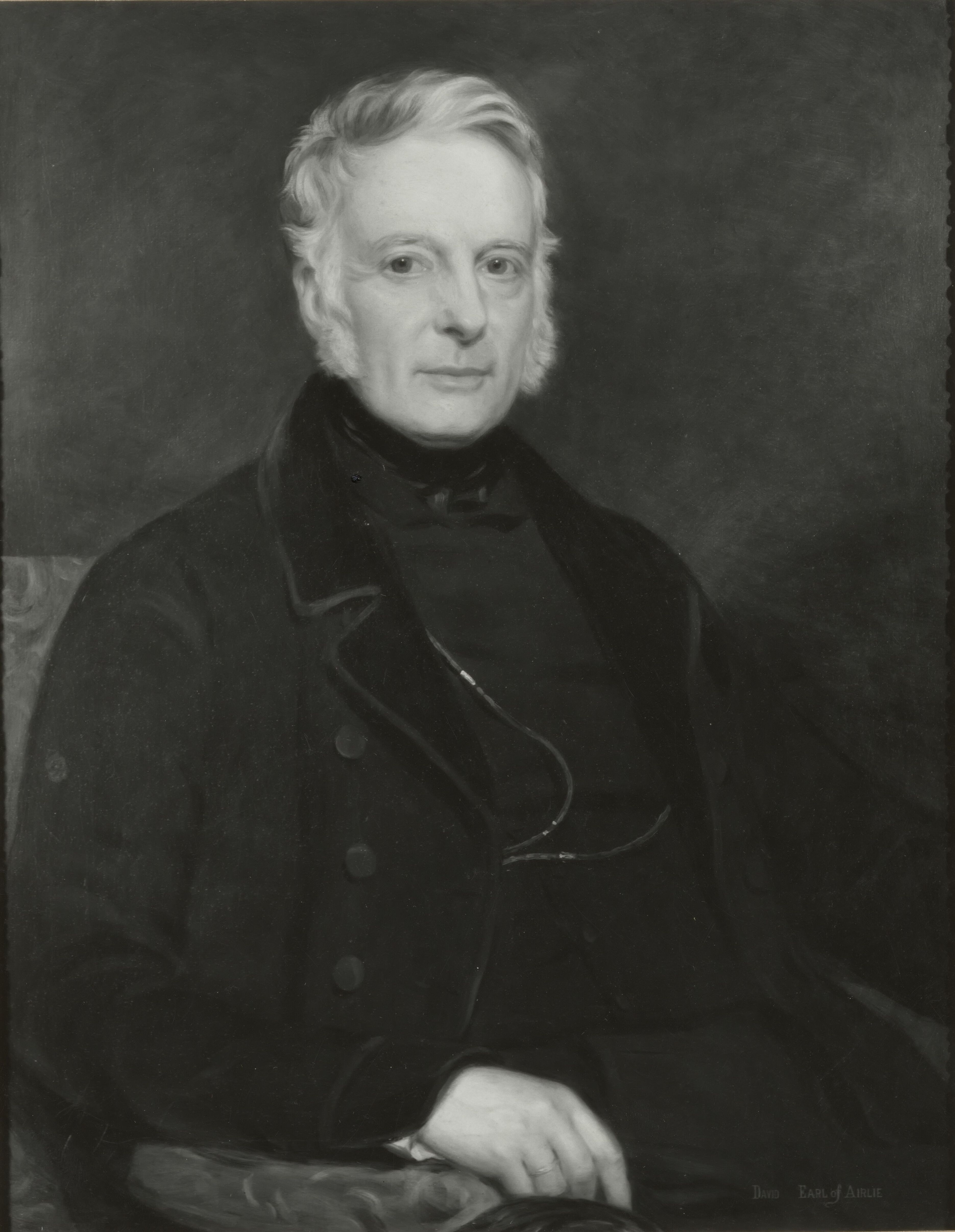
- David Ogilvy, painted by William Deey

Lord Lieutenant of Forfarshire
- In office 1828–1849
- Preceded by: The Lord Douglas
- Succeeded by: Fox Maule

Personal details
- Born: David Graham Drummond Ogilvy; 16 December 1785
- Died: 20 August 1849 (aged 63) London, England
- Spouses: Clementina Drummond; Margaret Bruce
- Children: 7, including David Ogilvy, 10th Earl of Airlie
- Parent: Walter Ogilvy

David Ogilvy, 9th Earl of Airlie (16 December 1785 – 20 August 1849) was a Scottish peer.

== Early life ==
David was the youngest son of Walter Ogilvy, who was de jure 8th Earl of Airlie, and Jean Ogilvy.

== Titles ==
David Ogilvy Restoration Act 1826
- Act of Parliament
- Parliament of the United Kingdom
- Long title: An Act to restore David Ogilvy Esquire and others from the Effects of the Attainders of James eldest Son of David Earl of Airlie, and of David Ogilvy, taking upon himself the Title of Lord Ogilvy.
- Citation: 7 Geo. 4. c. 50 Pr.

Dates
- Royal assent: 26 May 1826
- Commencement: 26 May 1826

On 26 May 1826 he succeeded to the title of 9th Earl of Airlie, after his honours were restored by an act of Parliament, the David Ogilvy Restoration Act 1826 (7 Geo. 4. c. 50 Pr.). He succeeded also to the titles of 10th Lord Ogilvy of Airlie and 4th Lord Ogilvy of Alith and Lintrathen. He gained the rank of Captain in the service of the 42nd Highlanders (Black Watch). Between 1833 and 1849 he held the office of Scottish representative peer. He also held the office of Lord Lieutenant of Angus which in that time was known as Forfarshire.

The 1833 steam locomotive, Earl of Airlie, was named after him; it ran on the Dundee and Newtyle Railway, of which he was a director.

== Slave ownership ==
As a result of his first marriage, Airlie came into possession of the "Ferry Pen" slave plantation in the British colony of Jamaica, which had 59 slaves. He was awarded compensation from the British government under the terms of the Slave Compensation Act 1837 (1 & 2 Vict. c. 3), receiving a £1,362 payment.

== Death ==
He died at Regent Street, London, England, aged 63. In May 1851 his will was probated.

== Marriages and family ==
On 7 October 1812 he married, firstly, Clementina Drummond, daughter of Gavin Drummond and Clementina Graham.

They had at least four children:

- Lady Jean Graham Drummond Ogilvy (27 February 1818 – 4 March 1902), married in 1837 John Arbuthnott, 9th Viscount of Arbuthnott
- Walter Ogilvy (21 September 1823 – 27 March 1824)
- David Graham Drummond Ogilvy, 10th Earl of Airlie (4 May 1826 – 25 September 1881)
- Helen Susanna Catherine Gertrude Ogilvy (1831 – 26 April 1862), married in 1859 George Augustus Pepper-Staveley

On 15 November 1838 he married, secondly, Margaret Bruce, daughter of William Bruce, at 6 Heriot Row, Edinburgh, Scotland.

They had four children:

- William Henry Bruce Ogilvy (26 February 1840 – 1912)
- James Bruce Ogilvy (1 December 1841 – 15 May 1888)
- John Bruce Ogilvy (17 June 1845 – 1904)
- Donald Bruce Ogilvy (17 June 1845 – 16 December 1890)

== Notes and sources ==
Honorary titles
Preceded by The Lord Douglas	Lord Lieutenant of Angus; 1828–1849	Succeeded by The Earl of Dalhousie
Peerage of Scotland
Preceded by Walter Ogilvy (de jure)	Earl of Airlie; 1826–1849	Succeeded by David Graham Drummond Ogilvy
