= Chancellor of the Order of the Thistle =

Office of the Order of the Thistle

The Chancellor of the Order of the Thistle is an office of the Order of the Thistle, established in 1687. The Chancellor is named by the Sovereign from among the knights.

== Office holders from 1913 ==
- 1913–1917: John Stewart-Murray, 7th Duke of Atholl
- 1917–1925: Douglas Graham, 5th Duke of Montrose
- 1926–1932: Henry Innes-Ker, 8th Duke of Roxburghe
- 1932–1949: Walter Erskine, Earl of Mar and Kellie (1865–1955)
- 1949–1955: Sidney Elphinstone, 16th Lord Elphinstone
- 1956–1966: David Ogilvy, 12th Earl of Airlie
- 1966–1973: Walter Montagu Douglas Scott, 8th Duke of Buccleuch
- 1973–1992: Alec Douglas-Home, Baron Home of the Hirsel
- 1992–2007: John Montagu Douglas Scott, 9th Duke of Buccleuch
- 2007–2023: David Ogilvy, 13th Earl of Airlie
- 2023–present: Richard Montagu Douglas Scott, 10th Duke of Buccleuch
