= Lady Kitty Vincent =

English dog breeder and author (1887-1969)

Lady Kitty Ritson (née Ogilvy, 1887-1969), best known as Lady Kitty Vincent during her writing career, was a Scottish dog breeder and author. She wrote many books, including non-fiction books about dogs and her travels in Canada; and fiction including historical novels and a series of pony stories for children.

== Life ==
Advertisement for Me and My Dogs (1930)

She was born Lady Kitty Edith Blanche Ogilvy on 5 February 1887 to David Ogilvy, 11th Earl of Airlie and Mabell Ogilvy, Countess of Airlie, who was an author, and educated at home. In 1906, she married Brigadier General Sir Berkeley Vincent. They had two sons, who died young. The couple divorced in 1925. During World War I, her brother Patrick was killed in action and her sister Mabell was killed while exercising army horses. In 1926 she married Lieutenant-Colonel Ralph Gerald Ritson. She served as Lady-in-Waiting to Mary, the Queen Mother.

== Select works ==
- Good Manners (1924)
- The Fiery Cross (1930)
- Two on a Trip (1930)
- Me and My Dogs (1933)

=== Pony books ===
- Molly the New Forest Pony (1940)
- Montana Adventure (1946)
- Tessa and Some Ponies (1953)
- John and Jennifer's Pony Club (1955)
- Tessa in South Africa (1955)
- Tessa to the Rescue (1957)
- Tessa and the Rannoch Dude Ranch (1961)
