= Virginia Ogilvy, Countess of Airlie =

British countess (1933–2024)

The Right Honourable The Countess of Airlie DCVO
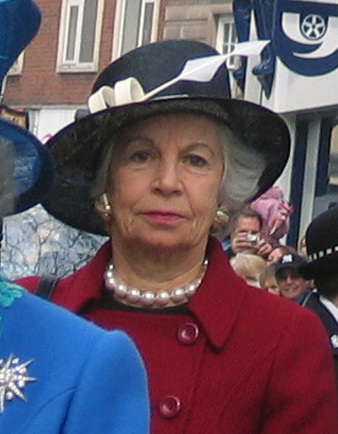
- The Countess of Airlie in 2005
- Born: Virginia Fortune Ryan; 9 February 1933; Mayfair, London, England
- Died: 16 August 2024 (aged 91); Cortachy, Scotland
- Spouse: David Ogilvy, 13th Earl of Airlie (m. 1952; died 2023)
- Children: 6
- Relatives: Otto Hermann Kahn (maternal grandfather); Thomas Fortune Ryan (paternal great-grandfather); Ida Mary Barry Ryan (paternal great-grandmother)

Virginia Fortune Ogilvy, Countess of Airlie, DCVO (née Ryan; 9 February 1933 – 16 August 2024) was a Lady of the Bedchamber to Queen Elizabeth II. She was born in London to an American family, and grew up in the United States before returning to the United Kingdom. In 1973, she became the first American to be a lady-in-waiting.

== Early life ==
Lady Airlie was born in Mayfair, London, on 9 February 1933, the daughter of John Barry Ryan Jr. (1901–1966) and Margaret Dorothy Kahn (1901–1995). Her mother was the daughter of German-American financier Otto Hermann Kahn and her father was the grandson of Thomas Fortune Ryan. She had one brother, John Barry Ryan III (1931–2003).

She was raised in New York City and Newport, Rhode Island. She was educated at the Brearley School in Manhattan and the James Franklyn School of Professional Arts. She often accompanied her mother on long trips to London.

She came out in society in 1950 with a ball at the Waldorf Astoria; other debutantes that evening included Lee Bouvier. She had a ball of her own at the St. Regis.

== Royal household ==
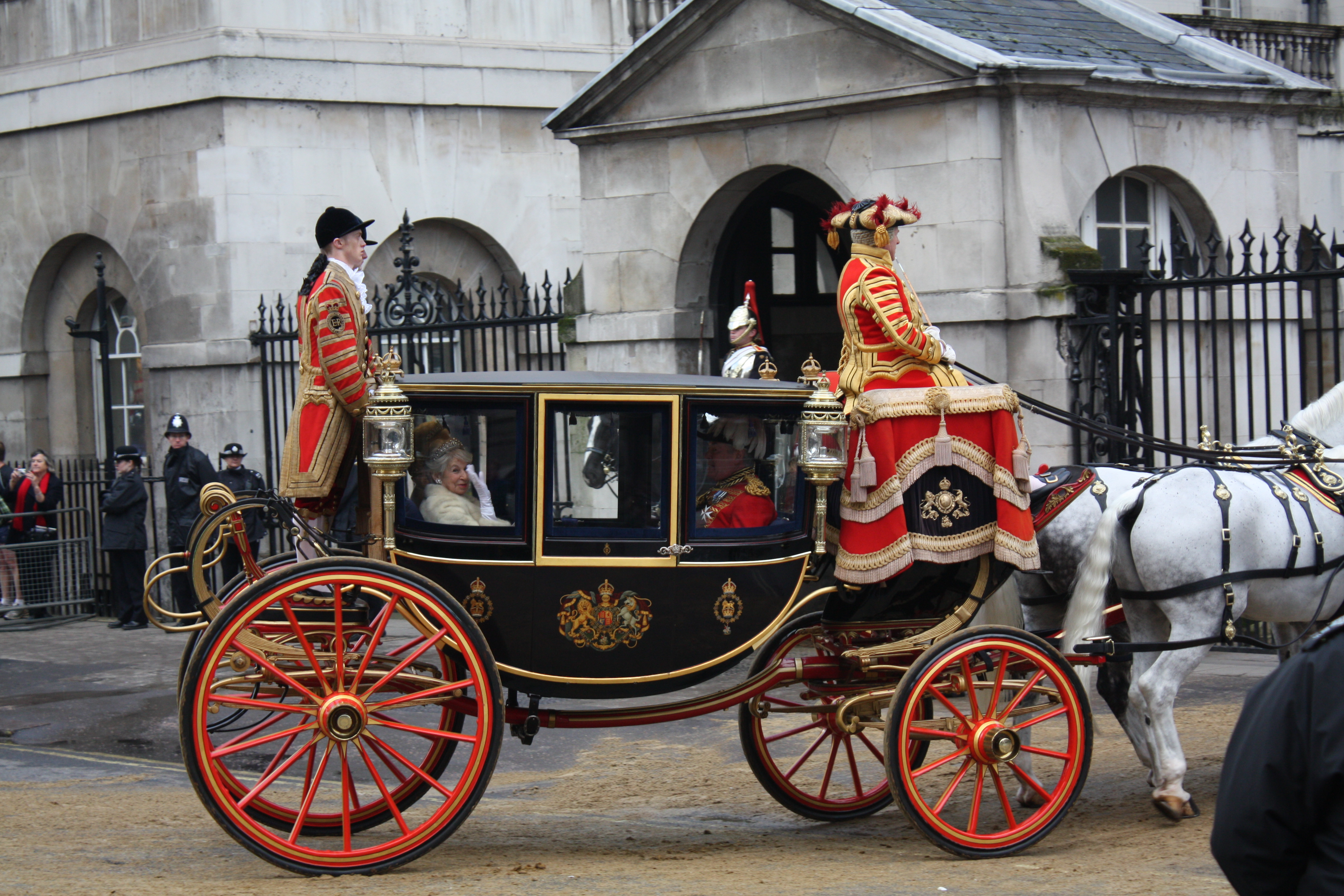
The Countess of Airlie returns to Buckingham Palace in a carriage in 2008, having attended the State Opening of Parliament in her capacity as Lady of the Bedchamber to Queen Elizabeth II.

Lady Airlie was appointed a Lady of the Bedchamber to Queen Elizabeth II on 1 January 1973. She was the first American to serve as a lady-in-waiting. She was following in the footsteps of her husband's grandmother, Mabell, Countess of Airlie, who had been a Lady of the Bedchamber to Queen Mary. She remained in the position until Queen Elizabeth II's death in September 2022.

For her royal service, she was appointed a Commander of the Royal Victorian Order (CVO) in the 1983 New Year Honours. She was promoted to a Dame Commander of the same order (DCVO) in the 1995 New Year Honours.

In 2003, Lady Airlie celebrated her 70th birthday with a dinner at the private member's nightclub Annabel's in Mayfair, which the Queen attended. It is thought to be the only occasion on which the Queen visited a nightclub after she was married.

As Lady of the Bedchamber, she was a senior lady-in-waiting and attended to the Queen on major occasions and overseas tours. In May 2007, she accompanied the Queen on her trip to the United States to commemorate the 400th anniversary of England's first American settlement at Jamestown, Virginia. On 7 May 2007, she attended a state dinner at the White House, hosted by President George W. Bush and First Lady Laura Bush. She was in attendance when the Queen received President Donald Trump and First Lady Melania Trump at Windsor Castle on 13 July 2018.

After the Queen's death, King Charles III retained his mother's ladies-in-waiting to assist with hosting events at Buckingham Palace. In this role, they were known as "ladies of the household".

== Personal life ==
Her nickname was "Ginnie". At the age of 16, she met David Ogilvy, Lord Ogilvy, at a dance at the Savoy Hotel. They were married on 23 October 1952 at St Margaret's, Westminster. One thousand guests attended, including Queen Elizabeth The Queen Mother, Princess Margaret, and Douglas Fairbanks Jr. She wore a white satin gown by Jean Dessès.

Virginia and David, who in 1968 became 13th Earl of Airlie, had six children:

- Lady Doune Mabell Ogilvy (born 13 August 1953); served as a bridesmaid at the wedding of her uncle Angus Ogilvy and Princess Alexandra of Kent. Lady Doune married Sir Hereward Charles Wake, 15th Bt, on 16 April 1977; they had four children, and divorced in July 1995.
- Lady Jane Fortune Margaret Ogilvy (born 24 June 1955); married François Nairac on 30 August 1980. The couple have two daughters.
- David John Ogilvy, 14th Earl of Airlie (born 9 March 1958); served as a page boy at the wedding of his uncle Angus Ogilvy and Princess Alexandra. He married first, in 1981, the Hon. Geraldine Harmsworth, daughter of Vere Harmsworth, 3rd Viscount Rothermere. They had a daughter before divorcing in 1990. Lord Ogilvy married secondly, in 1991, Tarka Kings, with whom he has three children.
- The Honourable Bruce Patrick Mark Ogilvy (born 7 April 1959).
- Lady Elizabeth Clementine Ogilvy (born 4 June 1965); married Jonathan Baring, with whom she has one child; and
- The Honourable Patrick Alexander Ogilvy (born 24 March 1971).

They resided at Cortachy Castle in Angus. She supported a scheme for the Refugees Defence Committee to provide holidays for concentration camp survivors. She also served on the Royal Fine Art Commission from 1975, and was a trustee of the Tate, National Gallery in London and the Scottish National Gallery. She was chairman of the American Museum in Britain from 1997 to 2000 and was president of the local branch of the Scottish Women's Institutes. The Earl of Airlie died on 26 June 2023, aged 97.

The Dowager Countess of Airlie died in Cortachy on 16 August 2024, aged 91. A statement released by Buckingham Palace stated that the King was "deeply saddened to hear the news, having known Lady Airlie for so much of his life and having so greatly appreciated her immense devotion and dedicated service to Her late Majesty over so many years." Her funeral was held at Cortachy on 30 August 2024.

== Awards and honours ==
Country	Date	Appointment	Ribbon	Post-nominal letters	Notes
United Kingdom	31 December 1982	Commander of the Royal Victorian Order		CVO	
United Kingdom	31 December 1994	Dame Commander of the Royal Victorian Order		DCVO	
United Kingdom	6 February 1977	Queen Elizabeth II Silver Jubilee Medal			
United Kingdom	6 February 2002	Queen Elizabeth II Golden Jubilee Medal			
United Kingdom	6 February 2012	Queen Elizabeth II Diamond Jubilee Medal			
United Kingdom	6 February 2022	Queen Elizabeth II Platinum Jubilee Medal			
