= Lady Griselda Cheape =

British anti-suffrage campaigner

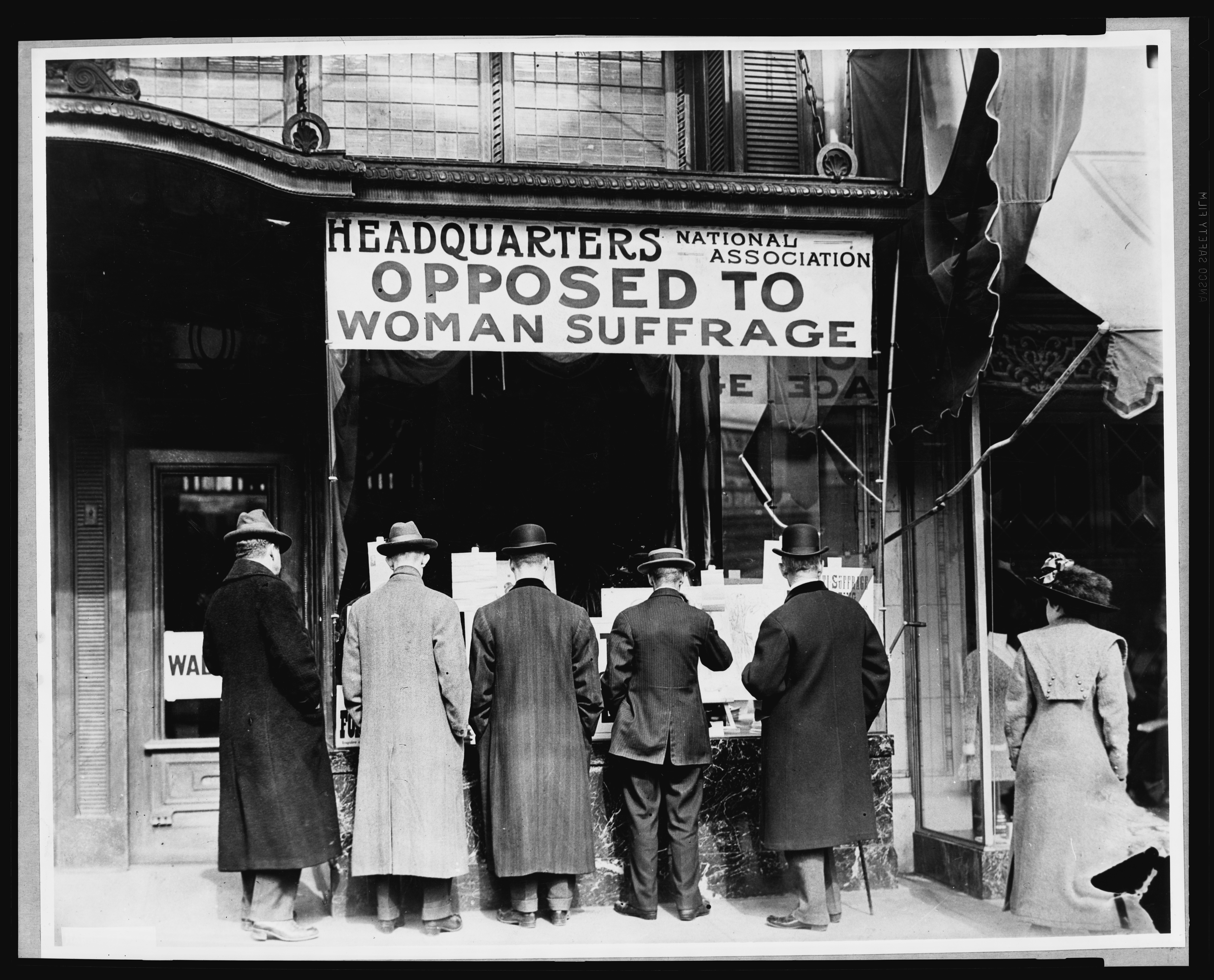
National Anti-suffrage Association

Lady Griselda Johanna Helen Cheape (20 December 1865 – 12 February 1934) was a British anti-suffrage campaigner.

== Early life ==
Born in Angus, Scotland, Griselda Ogilvy was the sixth child of Henrietta Blanche Stanley and Sir David Graham Drummond Ogilvy, Earl of Airlie.

== Family life ==
Griselda Ogilvy married James Cheape of Strathtyrum in 1897. They went on to have three children.

== Political activity ==
She was interested in the care of children and enrolled for nursing at the Royal Hospital for Sick Children Edinburgh. She also assisted at the Pendlebury Sick Children's Home in Manchester, Dundee Royal Infirmary and the London Temperance Hospital.

The issue of temperance was a cause she promoted and she was active within British Women's Temperance Association (BWTA).

She was prominent in the Scottish National Women's Anti-Suffragette League (WASL), founding the branch in St Andrews in 1909

The BWTA were pro women's suffrage, however the St Andrews branch where Lady Cheape was president (1909–12) was opposed. In 1913 Lady Cheape formed the 'Beehive'- an anti-suffrage society based in St Andrews. She was the President of the St Andrews Branch of the Scottish League for Opposing Women's Suffrage.

"Lady Cheape believed that direct political representation would undermine, rather than amplify, the idea of feminine moral superiority. Her opinions may be traced to her strongly evangelical approach to temperance reform that emphasised moral, rather than legal, 'suasion.'"

== Death ==
She died in 1934 in London.
