= Thomas Robert Swinburne =

- Born: March 1794
- Died: 1864
- Military career
- Branch: British Army
- Conflicts: Battle of Waterloo

Thomas Robert Swinburne of Marcus DL FRSE (1794–1864) was a British Army officer and amateur artist who served at the Battle of Waterloo.

== Life ==
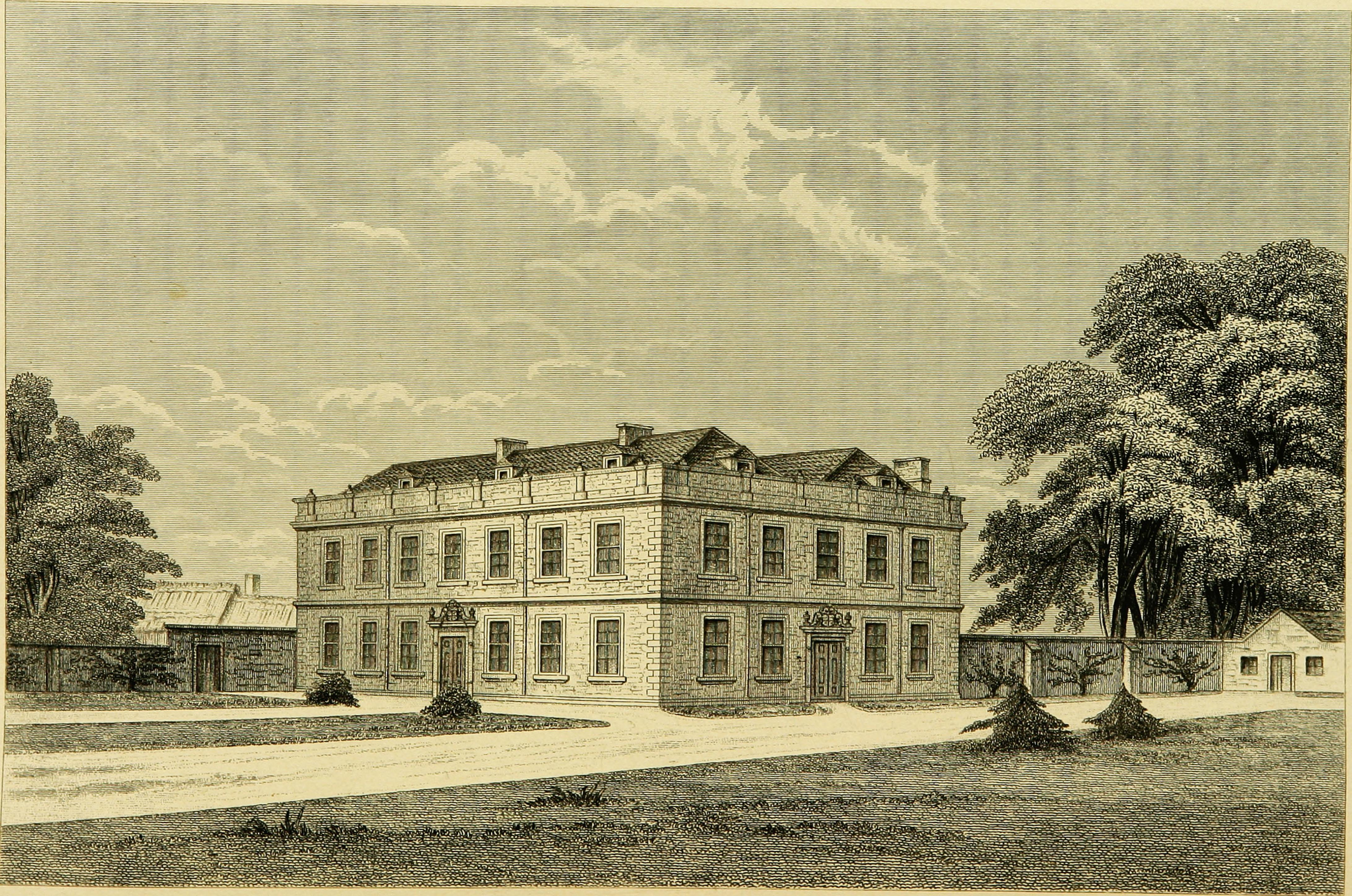
Pontop Hall

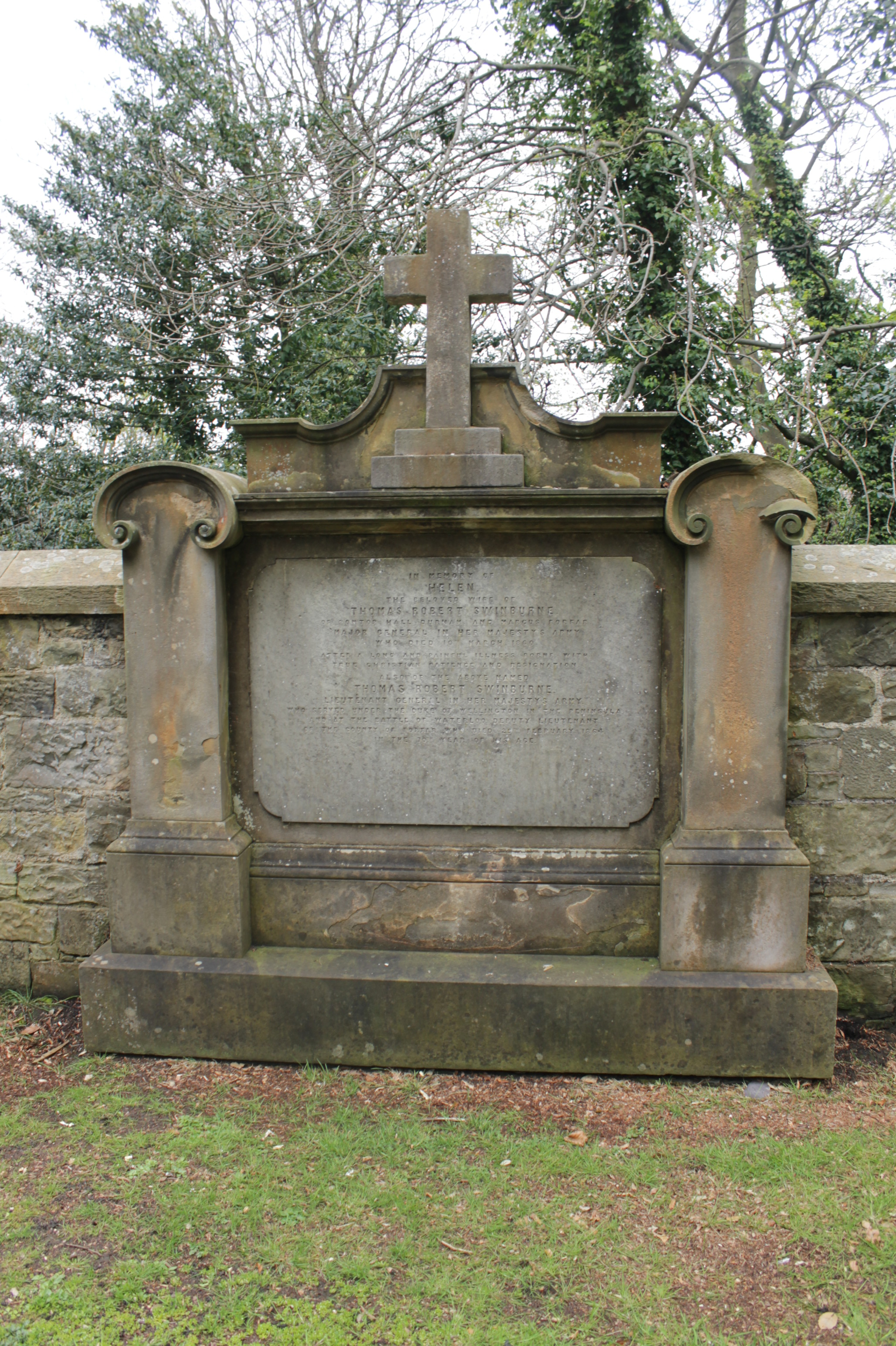
The grave of Thomas Robert Swinburne, Dean Cemetery

He was born in March 1794 and raised at Pontop Hall, a 17th-century manor house in County Durham. He was the eldest son of Thomas Swinburne (d.1825) and his wife, Charlotte Spearman.

In June 1813 he became an ensign in the 1st Regiment of Foot Guards. He was at the Battle of Waterloo at Quatre Bras and survived uninjured. He was also at the Siege of Peronne. In December 1816 he was promoted to captain and transferred to the 3rd Dragoon Guards. He became lieutenant colonel in 1838 and brevet colonel in 1851. He was major general in 1857 and lieutenant general shortly before death

From 1838 he was in administrative roles, based in Edinburgh. In 1839 he was elected an Fellow of the Royal Society of Edinburgh. His proposer was John Gordon of Cairnbulg.

He also had estates at Marcus in Forfar (sometimes shown as Margus), and was made Deputy Lieutenant of Forfar.

He retired to west Edinburgh and died there on 29 February 1864.

== Family ==
He married twice. Firstly in 1818 to Maria Coats, daughter of Anthony Coats. Following Maria's death in 1820 (a week after giving birth to their first and only child), in 1826 he married Helen Aspinall (d.1864).

His eldest son Thomas Anthony Swinburne (1820-1893) was a Captain in the Royal Navy.

== Known art works ==
- Pack Pony Jean (1815)
