= Order of the Thistle =

British order of chivalry associated with Scotland

Most Ancient and Most Noble Order of the Thistle
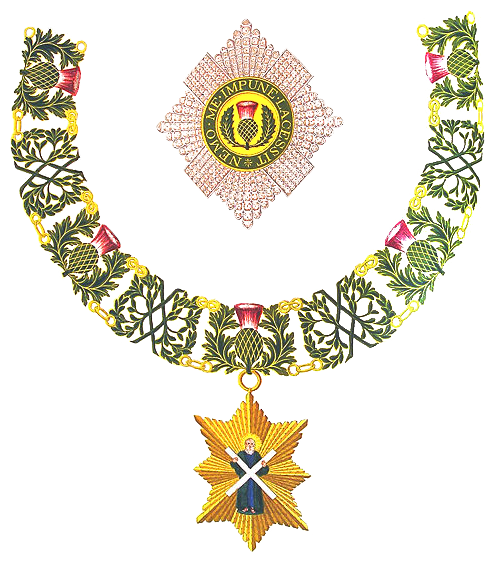
- Insignia of Knights and Ladies of the Most Ancient and Most Noble Order of the Thistle

Awarded by the monarch of Scotland and successor states
- Type: Order of chivalry
- Established: 1687; 339 years ago
- Motto: Nemo me impune lacessit
- Criteria: At the monarch's pleasure
- Status: Currently constituted
- Founder: James VII
- Sovereign: Charles III
- Chancellor: The Duke of Buccleuch and Queensberry
- Classes: Extra Knight/Lady (KT/LT); Knight/Lady (KT/LT)

Statistics
- First induction: 29 May 1687
- Total inductees: James VII: 8; Anne: 12; George I: 8; George II: 17; George III: 29; George IV: 10; William IV: 4; Victoria: 53; Edward VII: 8; George V: 27; Edward VIII: 0; George VI: 12; Elizabeth II: 58; Charles III: 7

Precedence
- Next (higher): Order of the Garter
- Next (lower): Order of St Patrick
- Ribbon of the Order of the Thistle

The Most Ancient and Most Noble Order of the Thistle is an order of chivalry associated with Scotland. The current version of the order was founded in 1687 by King James VII of Scotland, who asserted that he was reviving an earlier order. The order consists of the sovereign and sixteen knights and ladies, as well as certain "extra" knights (members of the British royal family and foreign monarchs). The sovereign alone grants membership of the order; they are not advised by the government, as occurs with most other orders.

Royal Coat of Arms of the United Kingdom for use in Scotland

The order's primary emblem is the thistle, the national flower of Scotland. The motto is Nemo me impune lacessit (Latin for "No one provokes me with impunity"). The same motto appears on the Royal coat of arms of the United Kingdom for use in Scotland and pound coins minted in 1984, 1989, 1994, and 1999 (since withdrawn), and is also the motto of the Royal Scots Dragoon Guards, the Scots Guards, the Royal Regiment of Scotland, and the Black Watch (Royal Highland Regiment) of Canada. The patron saint of the order is St Andrew.

Most British orders of chivalry cover the whole United Kingdom, but the three most exalted ones each pertain to one constituent country only. The Order of the Thistle, which pertains to Scotland, is the second most senior in precedence. Its equivalent in England, the Most Noble Order of the Garter, is the oldest documented order of chivalry in the United Kingdom, dating to the middle fourteenth century. In 1783 an Irish equivalent, the Most Illustrious Order of St Patrick, was founded, but it is now dormant.

== History ==
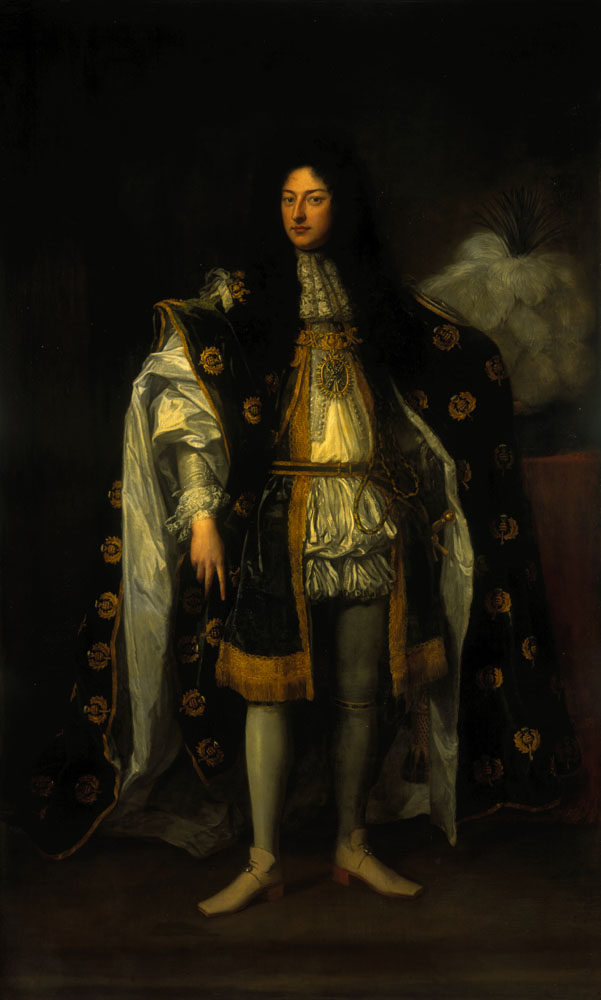
John Drummond, 1st Earl of Melfort in 1688; originator of the 'revived' order

The claim that James VII was reviving an earlier order is generally not supported by the evidence. The 1687 warrant states that during a battle in 786 with Angles under Æthelstan of East Anglia, the cross of St Andrew appeared in the sky to Achaius, King of Scots; after his victory, he established the Order of the Thistle and dedicated it to the saint. This seems unlikely on the face of it, since Achaius died a century before Æthelstan (though it is now thought that the opponents in this battle were not the East Anglian king Æthelstan (born around 894) but an earlier Northumbrian of the same name, and not the legendary Scottish King Achaius but the historical Pictish King Óengus II).

An alternative version is that the order was founded in 809 to commemorate an alliance between Achaius and Emperor Charlemagne; there is some plausibility to this, insofar as Charlemagne is believed to have employed Scottish bodyguards. Yet another version is that Robert the Bruce instituted the order after his victory at Bannockburn in 1314.

Most historians consider the earliest credible claim to be the founding of the order by James III, during the fifteenth century. He adopted the thistle as the royal badge, issued coins depicting thistles and allegedly conferred membership of the "Order of the Burr or Thissil" on Francis I of France, although there is no conclusive evidence for this.

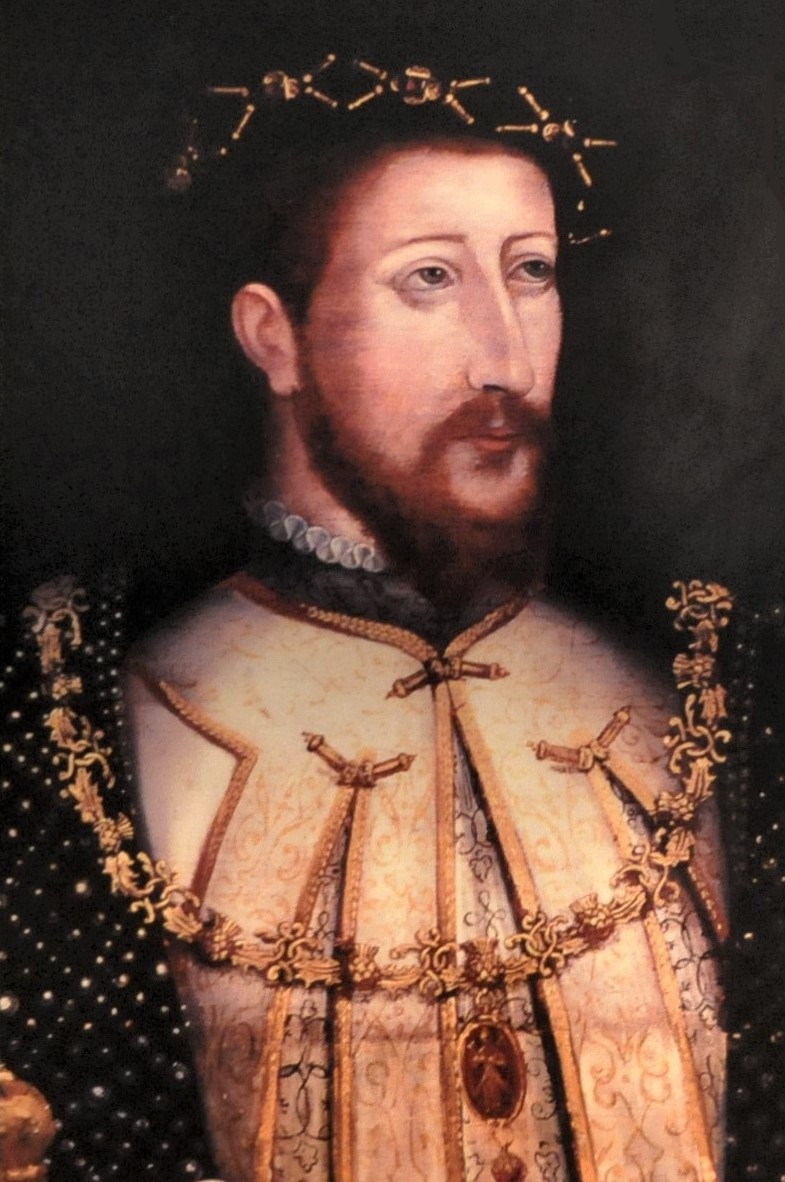
James V wearing a Thistle-style collar, c. 1538

Some Scottish order of chivalry may have existed during the sixteenth century, possibly founded by James V and called the Order of St. Andrew, but lapsed by the end of that century, although the evidence is unclear. A royal thistle collar is depicted in a book of hours, prepared for James IV in about 1503, where he is shown kneeling at an altar bearing the royal arms encircled by a collar of thistles and a badge depicting St Andrew. In a painting of 1538, James V is shown wearing a gold collar of linked thistles with a St Andrew badge, although the King's wardrobe inventories of the period make no mention of a thistle collar.

In 1558, a French commentator described the use of the crowned thistle and St Andrew's cross on Scottish coins and banners but noted there was no Scottish order of knighthood. Writing around 1578, John Lesley refers to the three foreign orders of chivalry carved on the gate of Linlithgow Palace, with James V's ornaments of St Andrew, proper to this nation. In 1610 William Fowler, the Scottish secretary to Anne of Denmark was asked about the Order of the Thistle. Fowler believed that there had been an order, founded to honour Scots who fought for Charles VII of France, but it had been discontinued in the time of James V, and could say nothing of its ceremonies or regalia.

James VII issued letters patent "reviving and restoring the Order of the Thistle to its full glory, lustre and magnificency" on 29 May 1687. His intention was to reward Scottish Catholics for their loyalty, but the initiative actually came from John, 1st Earl and 1st Jacobite Duke of Melfort, then Secretary of State for Scotland. Only eight members out of a possible twelve were appointed; these included Catholics, such as Melfort and the Lord Chancellor of Scotland, his elder brother James, 4th Earl and 1st Jacobite Duke of Perth, plus Protestant supporters like the Earl of Arran.

After James was deposed by the 1688 Glorious Revolution no further appointments were made, although the exiled House of Stuart continued to issue a Jacobite version until 1784 (the last appointment being Charlotte Stuart, Jacobite Duchess of Albany), although none of those were recognised by the British Crown. Queen Anne appointed knights to the Order from 1704, and it has remained in existence since then, and is used to recognise Scots 'who have held public office or contributed significantly to national life.'

=== Founder knights: 1687 creation ===
- James Drummond, 4th Earl of Perth; went into exile with James in 1688, died in France 1716
- George Gordon, 1st Duke of Gordon; exiled in 1689 but returned home and pardoned, included in the 1703 revival by Anne, died 1716
- John Murray, 1st Marquess of Atholl; reconciled with new regime in 1689, died 1703
- James, Earl of Arran; confirmed in his titles by William III in 1698, heavily involved in the disastrous Darien scheme, abstained from the vote passing the Acts of Union 1707, killed in a duel with Lord Mohun, 1712
- Kenneth Mackenzie, 4th Earl of Seaforth; imprisoned after 1688, released in 1696 and moved to Paris, died 1701
- John Drummond, 1st Earl of Melfort; went into exile with James in 1688, died in France 1714
- George Douglas, 1st Earl of Dumbarton; went into exile with James in 1688, died in France 1692
- Alexander Stuart, 5th Earl of Moray; lost office after 1688, died at home 1701

== Composition ==
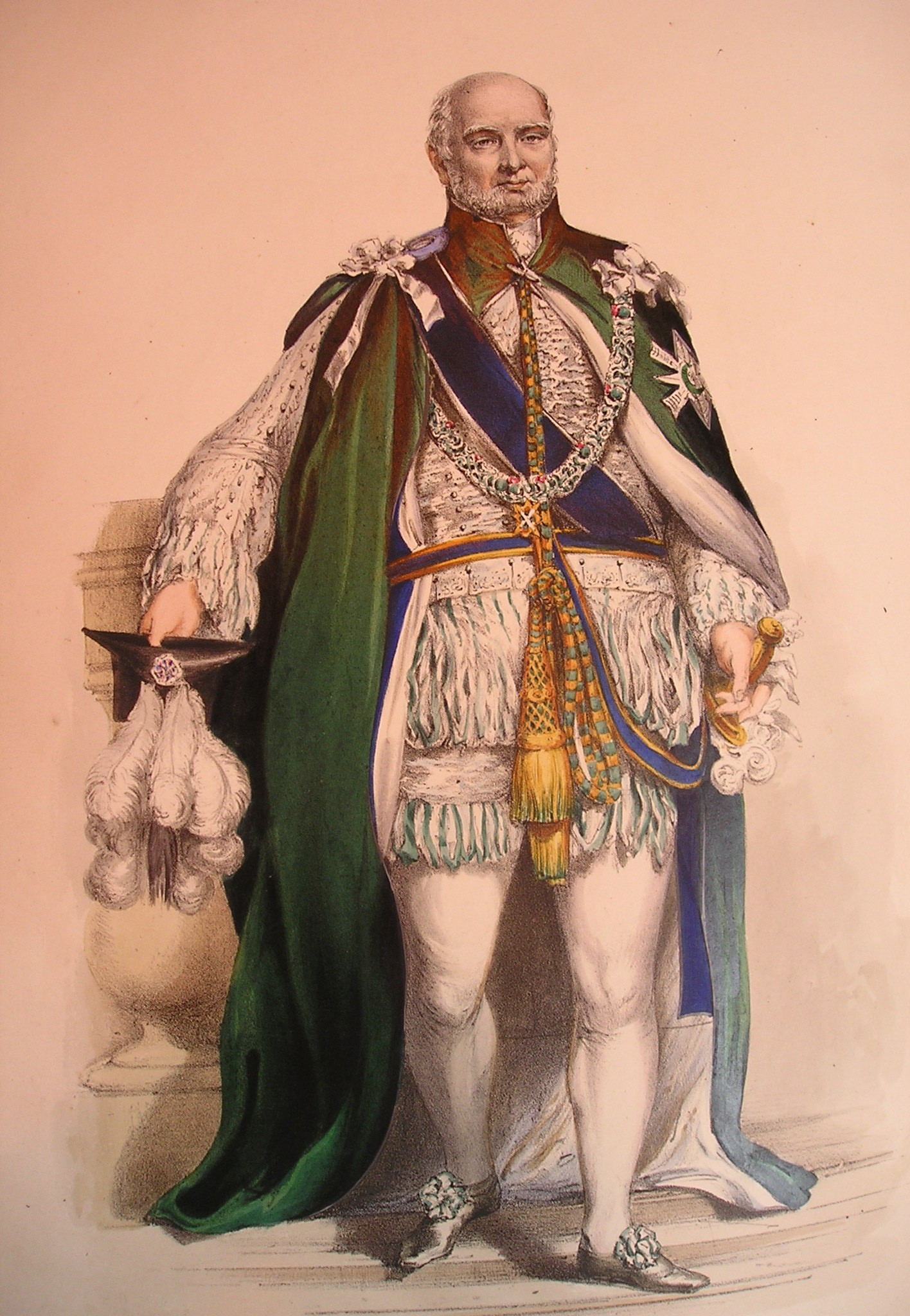
Prince Augustus Frederick, Duke of Sussex in the robes of a Knight of the Order of the Thistle

The Kings of Scots, later the Kings of Great Britain and of the United Kingdom, have served as sovereigns of the Order. When James VII revived the order, the statutes stated that the order would continue the ancient number of Knights, which was described in the preceding warrant as "the Sovereign and twelve Knights-Brethren in allusion to the Blessed Saviour and his Twelve Apostles". In 1827, George IV increased the number to sixteen members. Women (other than Queens regnant) were originally excluded from the Order, since members were required to be Knights Bachelor before appointment; George VI created his wife Queen Elizabeth a Lady of the Thistle in 1937 by a special statute, and in 1987 Elizabeth II allowed the regular admission of women to both the Order of the Thistle and the Order of the Garter.

From time to time, individuals may be admitted to the order by special statutes. Such members are known as "Extra Knights" or "Extra Ladies" and do not count towards the sixteen-member limit. Members of the British royal family are normally admitted through this procedure; the first to be so admitted was Prince Albert. King Olav V of Norway, the first foreigner to be admitted to the order, was also admitted by special statute in 1962.

The sovereign has historically had the power to choose knights of the order. From the eighteenth century onwards, the sovereign made his or her choices upon the advice of the government. George VI felt that the orders of the Garter and the Thistle had been used only for political patronage, rather than to reward actual merit. Therefore, with the agreement of the Prime Minister (Clement Attlee) and the Leader of the Opposition (Winston Churchill) in 1946, both orders returned to the personal gift of the sovereign.

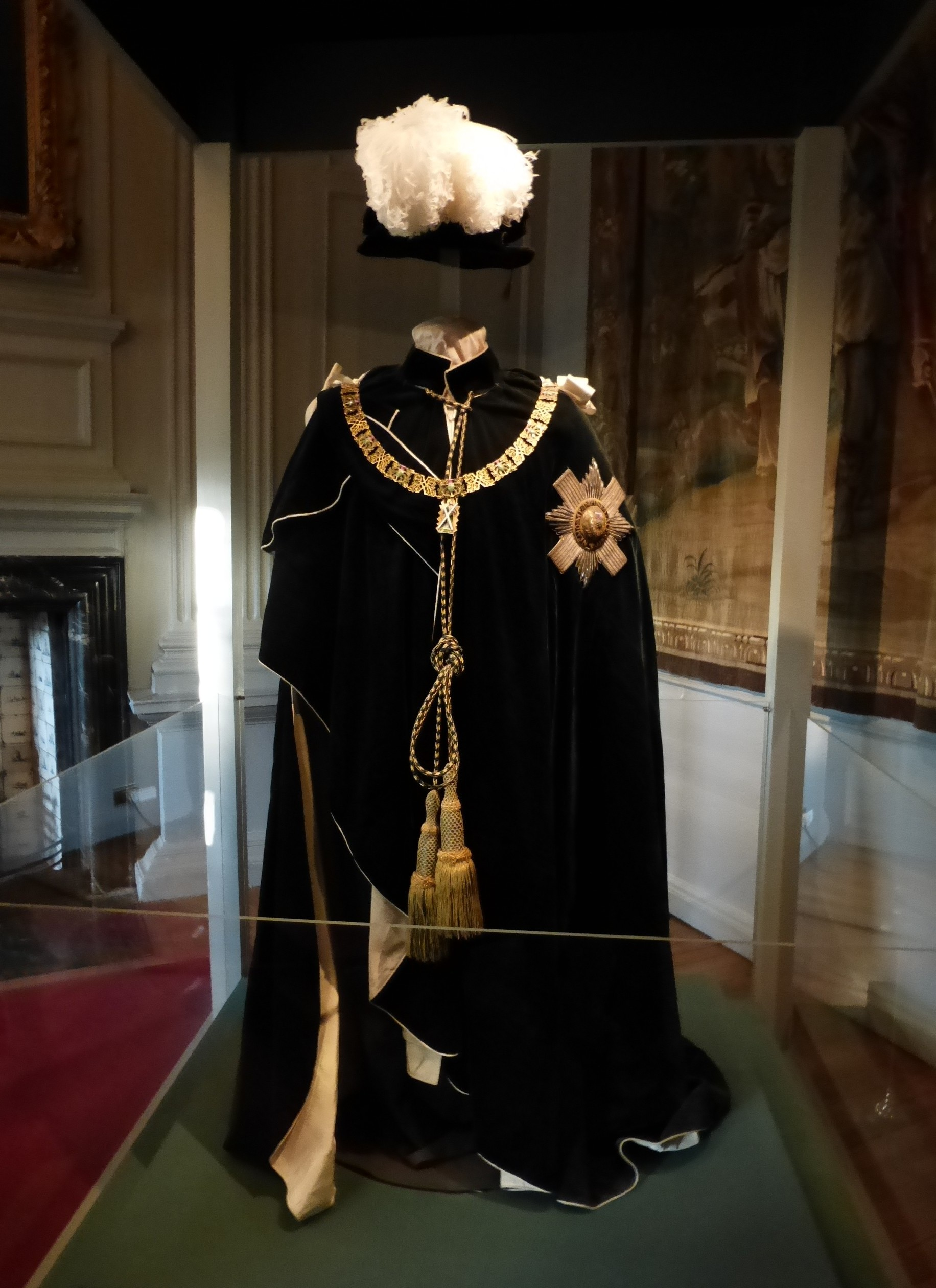
Vestments of a Knight of the Thistle

Knights and Ladies of the Thistle may also be admitted to the Order of the Garter. Formerly, many, but not all, Knights elevated to the senior order would resign from the Order of the Thistle. The first to resign from the Order of the Thistle was John Campbell, 2nd Duke of Argyll in 1710; the last to take such an action was Thomas Dundas, 2nd Earl of Zetland in 1872.

Knights and Ladies of the Thistle may also be deprived of their knighthoods. The only individual to have suffered such a fate was John Erskine, 6th Earl of Mar who lost both the knighthood and the earldom after participating in the Jacobite Rising of 1715.

The order has five officers: the Chancellor, the Secretary, the Dean, Lord Lyon King of Arms, and the Gentleman Usher of the Green Rod. The Dean is normally a cleric of the Church of Scotland. This office was not part of the original establishment, but was created in 1763 and joined to the office of Dean of the Chapel Royal. The two offices were separated in 1969. The office of Chancellor is mentioned and given custody of the seal of the order in the 1687 statutes, but no-one was appointed to the position until 1913. The office has subsequently been held by one of the knights, though not necessarily the most senior. The Usher of the Order is the Gentleman Usher of the Green Rod (unlike his Garter equivalent, the Gentleman Usher of the Black Rod, he does not have another function assisting the House of Lords). The Lord Lyon King of Arms, head of the Scottish heraldic establishment, whose office predates his association with the order, serves as King of Arms of the Order.

== Symbolism ==
According to legend, an invading Norse army was attempting to sneak up at night upon a Scottish army's encampment. During this operation, one barefoot Norseman had the misfortune to step upon a thistle, causing him to cry out in pain, thus alerting Scots to the presence of the Norse invaders. Some sources suggest the specific occasion was the 1263 Battle of Largs, which marked the beginning of the departure of King Haakon IV (Haakon the Elder) of Norway who, having control of the Northern Isles and Hebrides, had harried the coast of the Kingdom of Scotland for some years.

== Habit and insignia ==
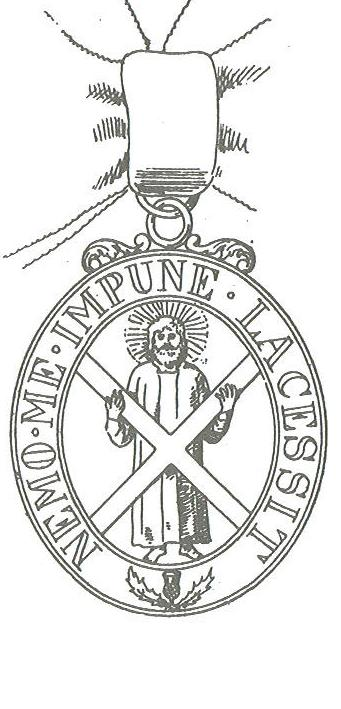
St Andrew with the saltire in the badge of the Order of the Thistle

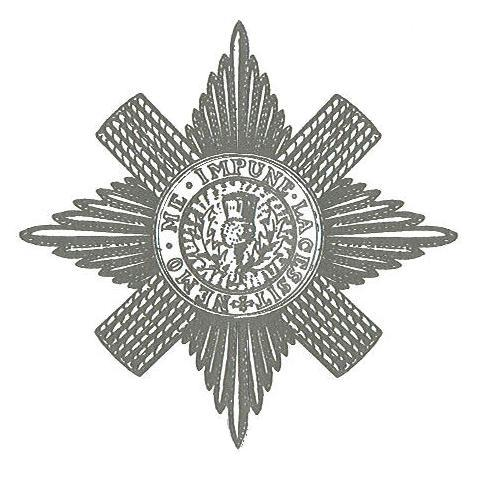
The star of the Order of the Thistle

For the Order's great occasions, such as its annual service each June or July, as well as for coronations, the Knights and Ladies wear an elaborate costume:

- The mantle is a green robe worn over their suits or military uniforms. The mantle is lined with white taffeta; it is tied with green and gold tassels. On the left shoulder of the mantle, the star of the order (see below) is depicted.
- The hat is made of black velvet and is plumed with white feathers with a black egret's or heron's top in the middle.
- The collar is made of gold and depicts thistles and sprigs of rue. It is worn over the mantle.
- The St Andrew, also called the badge-appendant, is worn suspended from the collar. It comprises a gold enamelled depiction of St Andrew, wearing a green gown and purple coat, holding a white saltire. Gold rays of a glory are shown emanating from St Andrew's head.

Aside from these special occasions, however, much simpler insignia are used whenever a member of the order attends an event at which decorations are worn:

- The star of the order consists of a silver St Andrew's saltire, with clusters of rays between the arms thereof. In the centre is depicted a green circle bearing the motto of the order in gold majuscules; within the circle, there is depicted a thistle on a gold field. It is worn pinned to the left breast. (Since the Order of the Thistle is the second most senior chivalric order in the UK, a member will wear its star above that of other orders to which he or she belongs, except that of the Order of the Garter; up to four orders' stars may be worn.)
- The broad riband is a dark green sash worn across the body, from the left shoulder to the right hip.
- At the right hip of the riband, the badge of the order is attached. The badge depicts St Andrew in the same form as the badge-appendant, surrounded by the order's motto.

However, on certain collar days designated by the sovereign, members attending formal events may wear the order's collar over their military uniform, formal wear, or other costume. They will then substitute the broad riband of another order to which they belong (if any), since the Order of the Thistle is represented by the collar.

Upon the death of a Knight or Lady, the insignia must be returned to the Central Chancery of the Orders of Knighthood. The badge and star are returned personally to the sovereign by the nearest relative of the deceased.

Officers of the order also wear green robes. The Gentleman Usher of the Green Rod also bears, as the title suggests, a green rod.

== Chapel ==
When James VII created the modern order in 1687, he directed that the Abbey Church at the Palace of Holyroodhouse be converted to a chapel for the Order of the Thistle, perhaps copying the idea from the Order of the Garter (whose chapel is located in Windsor Castle). James VII, however, was deposed by 1688; the chapel, meanwhile, had been destroyed during riots. The order did not have a chapel until 1911, when one was added onto St Giles High Kirk in Edinburgh. Each year, the sovereign resides at the Palace of Holyroodhouse for a week in June or July; every two years during the visit, a service for the order is held. Any new knights or ladies are installed at annual services.

Each member of the order, including the sovereign, is allotted a stall in the chapel, above which his or her heraldic devices are displayed. Perched on the pinnacle of a knight's stall is his helm, decorated with mantling and topped by his crest. If he is a peer, the coronet appropriate to his rank is placed beneath the helm. Under the laws of heraldry, women, other than monarchs, do not normally bear helms or crests; instead, the coronet alone is used (if she is a peeress or princess). Lady Marion Fraser had a helm and crest included when she was granted arms; these were displayed above her stall in the same manner as for knights. Unlike other British orders, the armorial banners of Knights and Ladies of the Thistle are not hung in the chapel, but instead in an adjacent part of St Giles High Kirk. The Thistle Chapel does, however, bear the arms of members living and deceased on stall plates. These enamelled plates are affixed to the back of the stall and display its occupant's name, arms, and date of admission into the order.

Upon the death of a Knight, his helm, mantling, crest (or coronet or crown) and sword are taken down. The stall plates, however, are not removed; rather, they remain permanently affixed to the back of the stall, so that the stalls of the chapel are festooned with a colourful record of the order's knights and ladies since 1911. The entryway just outside the doors of the chapel has the names of the order's knights from before 1911 inscribed into the walls giving a complete record of the members of the order.

== Precedence and privileges ==
Knights and Ladies of the Thistle are assigned positions in the order of precedence, ranking above all others of knightly rank except the Order of the Garter, and above baronets. Wives, sons, daughters and daughters-in-law of Knights of the Thistle also feature on the order of precedence; relatives of Ladies of the Thistle, however, are not assigned any special precedence. (Generally, individuals can derive precedence from their fathers or husbands, but not from their mothers or wives.)

Knights of the Thistle prefix "Sir", and Ladies prefix "Lady", to their forenames. Wives of Knights may prefix "Lady" to their surnames, but no equivalent privilege exists for husbands of Ladies. Such forms are not used by peers and princes, except when the names of the former are written out in their fullest forms.

Knights and Ladies use the post-nominal letters "KT" and "LT" respectively. When an individual is entitled to use multiple post-nominal letters, "KT" or "LT" appears before all others, except "Bt" or "Btss" (Baronet or Baronetess), "VC" (Victoria Cross), "GC" (George Cross) and "KG" or "LG" (Knight or Lady Companion of the Garter).

Knights and Ladies may encircle their arms with the circlet (a green circle bearing the order's motto) and the collar of the order; the former is shown either outside or on top of the latter. The badge is depicted suspended from the collar. The Royal Arms depict the collar and motto of the Order of the Thistle only in Scotland; they show the circlet and motto of the Garter in England, Wales and Northern Ireland.

Knights and Ladies are also entitled to receive heraldic supporters. This high privilege is shared only by members of the Royal Family, peers, Knights and Ladies Companion of the Garter, and Knights and Dames Grand Cross of the junior orders of chivalry and clan chiefs.

== Current members and officers ==
=== Sovereign ===
Name	Year of appointment	Present age	Arms
King Charles III (ex officio)	1977 as The Duke of Rothesay; Sovereign since 2022	77	

=== Extra Knights and Ladies ===
Name	Year of appointment	Present age	Arms
Anne, Princess Royal KG, KT, GCVO, GCStJ, QSO, GCL, CMM, CD, ADC	2000	76	
Prince William, Duke of Rothesay KG, KT, GCB, PC, ADC	2012 as The Earl of Strathearn; Duke of Rothesay since 2022	44	
Queen Camilla LG, LT, ONZ, GCVO, GBE, CSM, CD, PC	2023	79	
Prince Edward, Duke of Edinburgh KG, KT, GCVO, CD, ADC	2024	62	

=== Knights and Ladies ===
Member number (Note: The number shown in brackets is the individual's place in the wider order of appointment since the Order's inception.)	Name	Known for	Year of appointment	Present age	Arms
1-(200)	Andrew Bruce, 11th Earl of Elgin KT, CD, JP, DL	Lord Lieutenant of Fife	1981	102	
2-(214)	David Wilson, Baron Wilson of Tillyorn KT, GCMG, FRSE	Governor of Hong Kong	2000	91	
3-(217)	David Steel, Baron Steel of Aikwood KT, KBE, PC	Presiding Officer of the Scottish Parliament	2004	88	
4-(218)	George Robertson, Baron Robertson of Port Ellen KT, GCMG, PC, FRSA, FRSE	Secretary General of NATO	2004	80	
5-(219)	William Cullen, Baron Cullen of Whitekirk KT, PC, KC, FRSE, FREng	Lord President of the Court of Session and Lord Justice General	2007	90	
6-(221)	David Hope, Baron Hope of Craighead KT, PC, KC, FRSE	Deputy President of the Supreme Court of the United Kingdom	2009	88	
7-(222)	Narendra Patel, Baron Patel KT, FMedSci, FRSE	Chancellor of the University of Dundee	2009	88	
8-(224)	Robert Smith, Baron Smith of Kelvin KT, CH, FRSGS	Governor of the British Broadcasting Corporation	2014	82	
9-(225)	Richard Scott, 10th Duke of Buccleuch KT, GCVO, KBE, FSA, FRSE, FRSGS	Lord Lieutenant of Roxburgh, Ettrick and Lauderdale	2017	72	
10-(227)	Lady Elish Angiolini LT, DBE, KC, FRSA, FRSE	Lord Advocate, Principal of St Hugh's College, Oxford	2022	66	
11-(229)	Sue Black, Baroness Black of Strome LT, DBE, FRS, FRSE, FRAI, FRSB	President of the Royal Anthropological Institute of Great Britain and Ireland	2024	65	
12-(230)	Helena Kennedy, Baroness Kennedy of The Shaws LT, KC, FRSA, HonFRSE	Chair of the British Council	2024	76	
13-(232)	Sir Jim McDonald KT, GBE, FRSE, FREng, FInstP, FIET	Principal of the University of Strathclyde	2026	68–69	
14-(233)	Sir James MacMillan KT, CBE, FRSE	Classical composer and conductor	2026	67	
15-(234)	Vacant (Note: Vacant following the death of James Mackay, Baron Mackay of Clashfern on 7 July 2026.)				
16-(235)	Vacant (Note: Vacant following the death of Sir Ian Wood on 26 July 2026.)				

=== Officers ===
- Dean: David Fergusson OBE, FRSE, FBA (2019)
- Chancellor: Richard Scott, 10th Duke of Buccleuch KT, GCVO, KBE, FSA, FRSE, FRSGS (2024)
- King of Arms: Canon Joseph Morrow CVO, CBE, KC, DL, FRSE, Lord Lyon King of Arms (ex officio, 2014)
- Secretary: Elizabeth Roads LVO, OStJ (2014)
- Usher: Katherine Grainger, Baroness Grainger DBE, Usher of the Green Rod (ex officio, 2026)

== See also ==
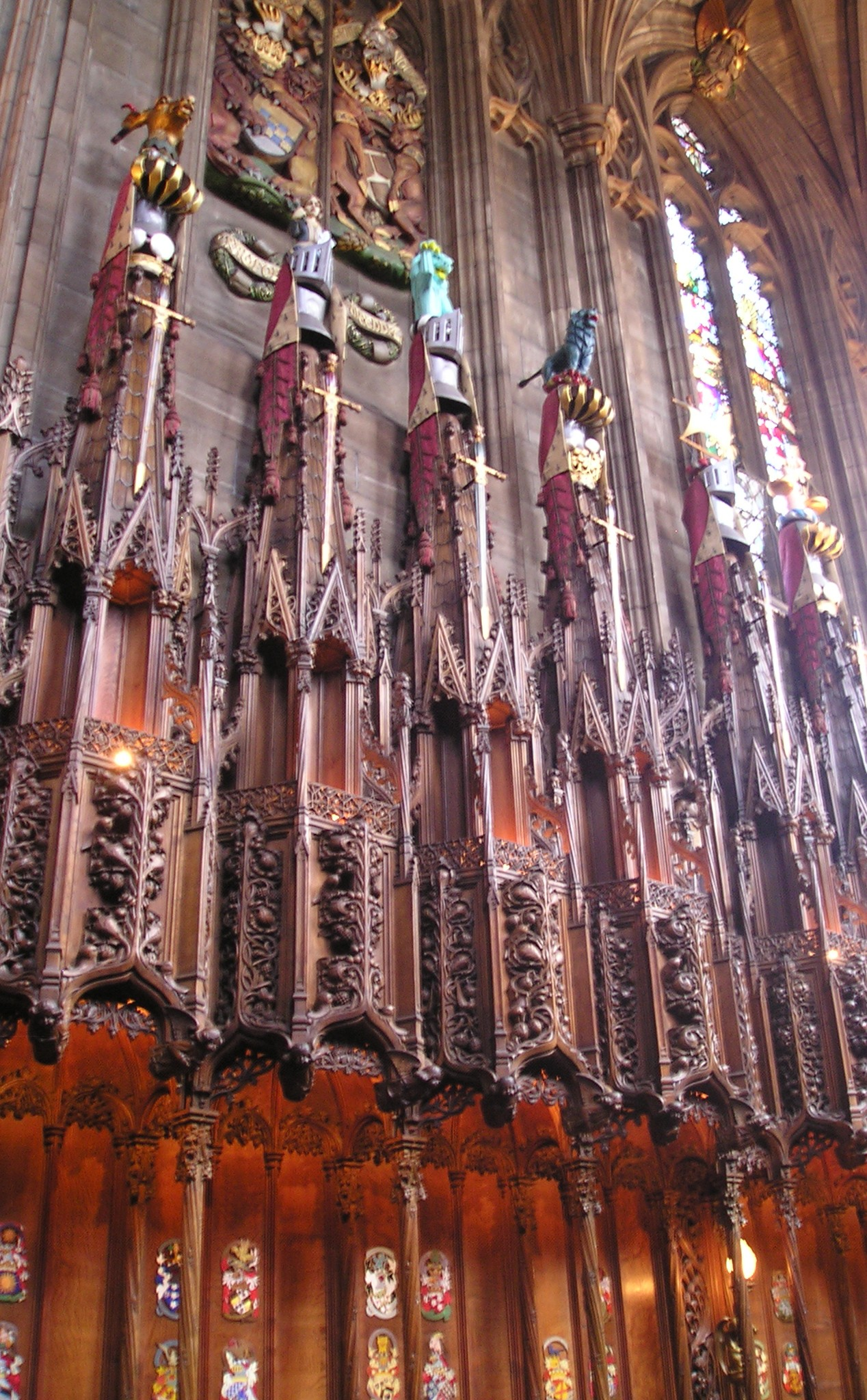
Swords, helms and crests of Knights of the Thistle above their stalls in the Thistle Chapel. Lady Marion Fraser's helm and crest are second from the left

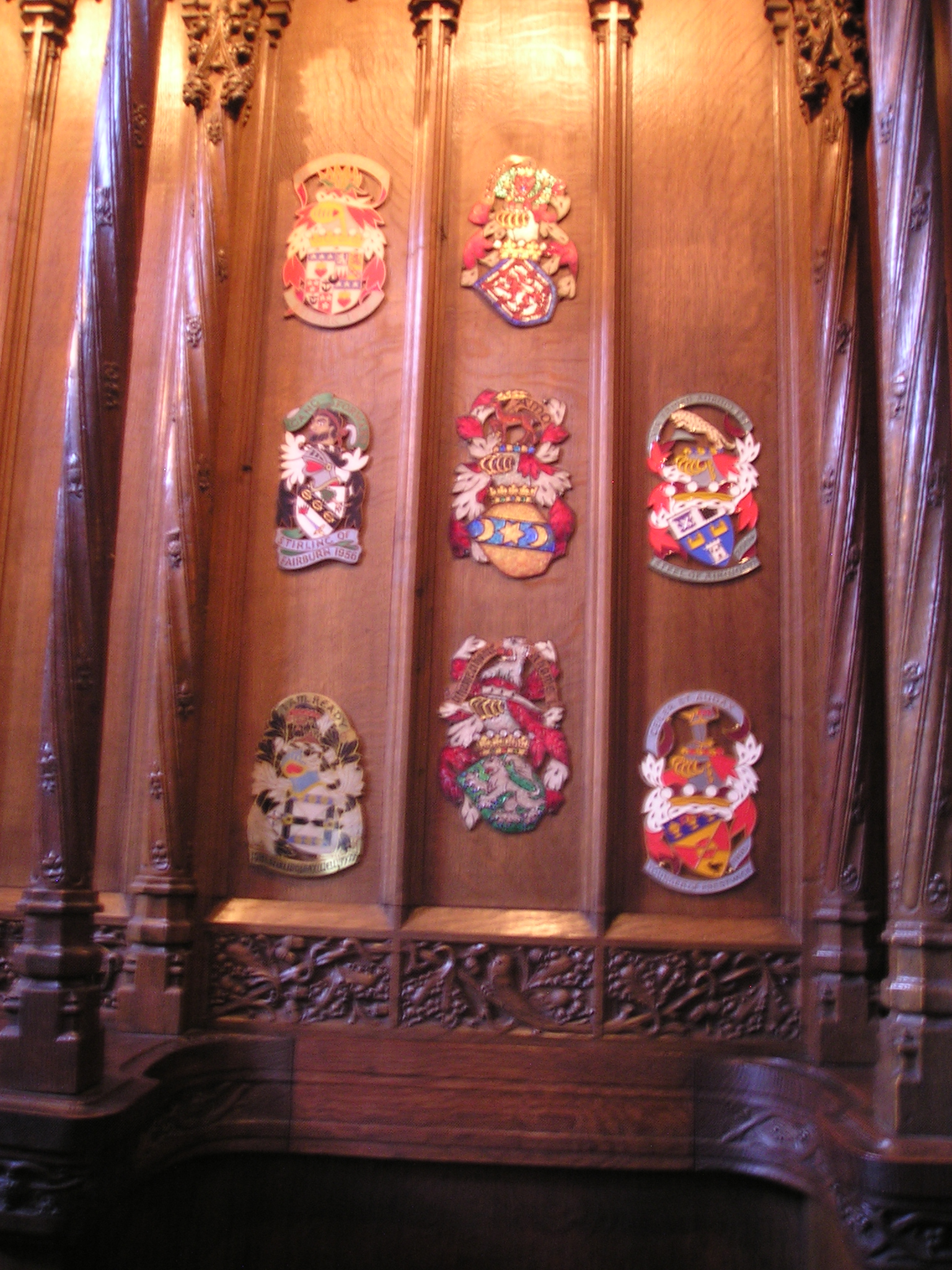
Stall plates of Knights of the Thistle

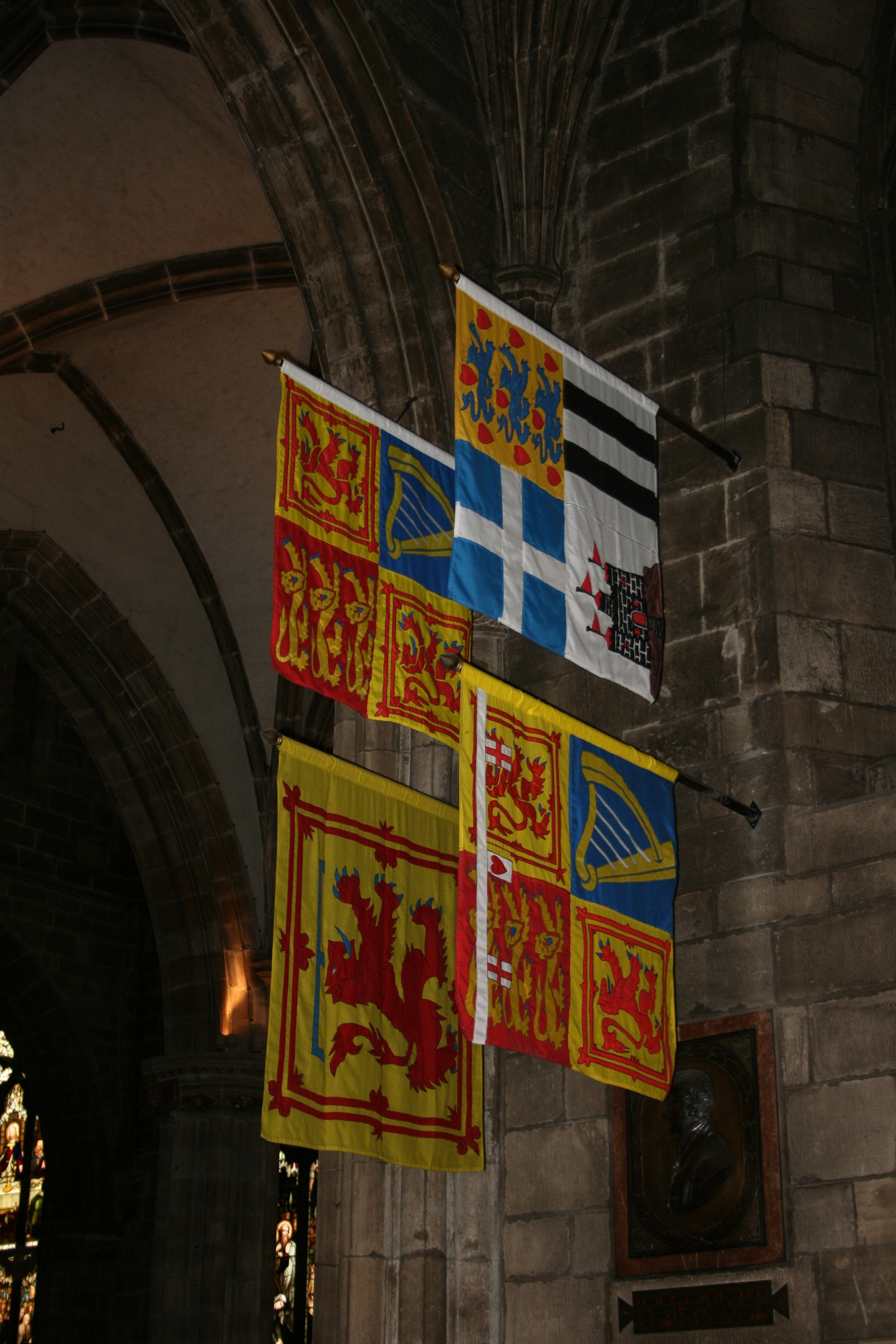
Royal Banners hanging in St Giles High Kirk

- List of knights and ladies of the Thistle (1687–present)
- Thistle Chapel

== Sources ==
=== Printed ===
- Burnett, C. J.; Hodgson, L. (2001). Stall Plates of the Most Ancient and Most Noble Order of the Thistle in the Chapel of the Order within St Giles' Cathedral, The High Kirk of Edinburgh. Edinburgh: Heraldry Society of Scotland. ISBN 978-0-9525258-3-7.
- Debrett's Peerage and Baronetage. London: Debrett's Peerage Ltd. 1995.
- Galloway, Peter (2009). The Order of the Thistle. London: Spink & Son Ltd. ISBN 978-1-902040-92-9.
- Innes of Learney, T. (1956). Scots Heraldry; a practical handbook on the historical principles and modern application of the art and science (2nd ed.). Edinburgh: Oliver and Boyd.
- McGill, Lyndsay (2020). "Identification of an early Order of the Thistle badge". The Journal of the Orders and Medals Research Society. Orders & Medals Research Society Journal. Vol. 59, No. 4. Dec 2020. ISSN 1474-3353.
- Mackey, A. G.; Haywood, H. L. (1946). Encyclopedia of Freemasonry. Kessinger Publishing. ISBN 978-0-7661-4719-5.
- Nicolas, N. H. (1842). History of the Orders of Knighthood of the British Empire, of the Order of the Guelphs of Hanover; and of the Medals, Clasps, and Crosses, Conferred for Naval and Military Service, Vol. III. London: John Hunter.
- Paul, J. B. (1911). The knights of the Order of the Thistle: a historical sketch by the Lord Lyon King of Arms, and a descriptive sketch of their chapel by J. Warrack. Edinburgh.
- Order of the Thistle (1978). Statutes of the Most Ancient and Most Noble Order of the Thistle: revived by His Majesty King James II of England and VII of Scotland and again revived by Her Majesty Queen Anne. Edinburgh: The Order.
- Woodcock, T.; Robinson, J. M. (1988). The Oxford Guide to Heraldry. Oxford: Oxford University Press. ISBN 978-0-19-211658-1.

=== Online ===
- "The Monarchy Today: Queen and Public: Honours: The Order of the Thistle". The official website of the British Monarchy. Archived from the original on 14 April 2010.
- "Royal Insight: Mailbox". The Royal Household. February 2007.
- "The Scale of General Precedence in Scotland". Burke's Peerage. Archived from the original on 4 February 2007.
