= Mabell Ogilvy, Countess of Airlie =

British courtier and author

The Right Honourable The Countess of Airlie GCVO GBE
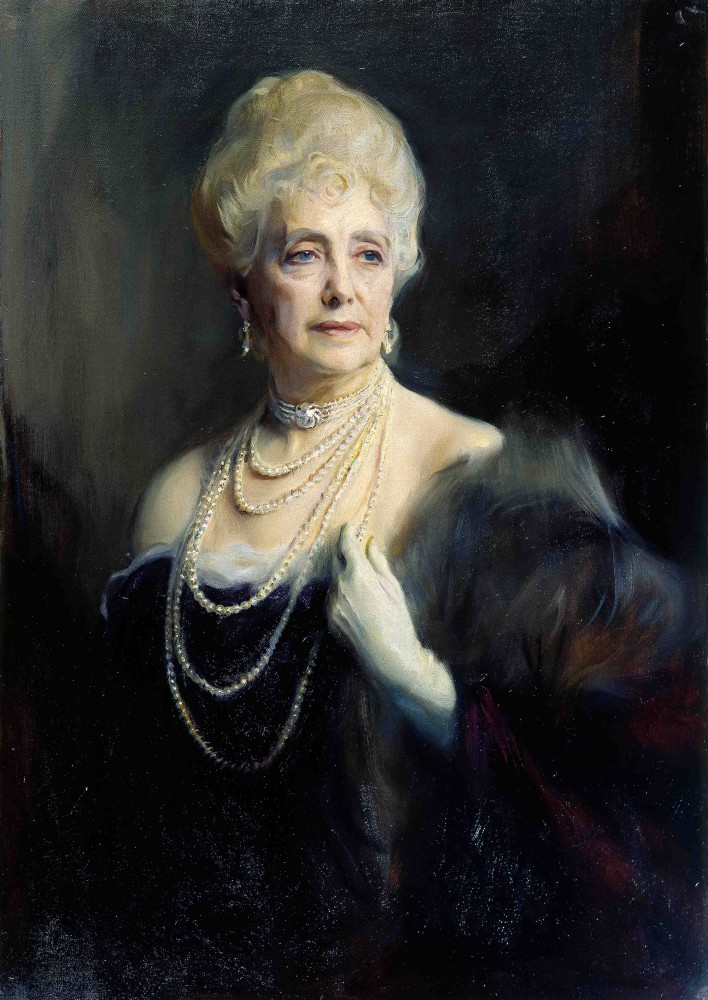
- Portrait by Philip de László, 1933
- Born: Hon. Mabell Frances Elizabeth Gore; 10 March 1866; Mayfair, London, England
- Died: 7 April 1956 (aged 90); Paddington, London, England
- Occupation: Lady of the Bedchamber to Queen Mary
- Spouse: David Ogilvy, 11th Earl of Airlie (m. 1886; died 1900)
- Children: Lady Kitty Ogilvy; Lady Helen Ogilvy; Lady Mabell Ogilvy; David Ogilvy, 12th Earl of Airlie; Hon. Bruce Ogilvy; Hon. Patrick Ogilvy
- Parent(s): Arthur Gore, 5th Earl of Arran; Hon. Edith Jocelyn

Mabell Frances Elizabeth Ogilvy, Countess of Airlie (née Gore; 10 March 1866 – 7 April 1956), was a British courtier and author.

== Early life ==
She was born the eldest daughter of Arthur Gore, Viscount Sudley, and his wife Edith, daughter of Robert Jocelyn, Viscount Jocelyn. Her mother died in 1871 and she and her sisters, Cicely and Esther, were raised by their maternal grandmother, Lady Jocelyn. The sisters were educated by governesses and made visits to the Duchess of Teck at White Lodge, where Mabell Gore met and befriended the Duchess's daughter, Princess May (later Queen Mary). When her paternal grandfather, Philip Gore, 4th Earl of Arran, died in 1884 and her father inherited the former's titles, she and her sisters were entitled to the nominal prefix of Lady.

== Life ==
On 19 January 1886, Mabell Gore married an army officer, David Ogilvy, 11th Earl of Airlie, at St George's, Hanover Square, becoming the Countess of Airlie. They had six children.

On the outbreak of the Second Boer War in 1899, Lord Airlie went with his regiment, the 12th Royal Lancers, to South Africa, where he was killed in action at the Battle of Diamond Hill in 1900. After the end of the war in 1902, Lady Airlie paid a visit to South Africa.

Following her husband's death, Lady Airlie began to manage Cortachy Castle in Angus on behalf of her eldest son, David, the new earl, who was then only six years old. After opening the Dundee Sanatorium for Consumptives (i.e. for the treatment of tuberculosis), which had been built on a site gifted by her late husband shortly before his death in 1900, she was on 26 September 1902 presented with the Freedom of the City of Dundee.

In December 1901, she became a Lady of the Bedchamber to her old friend, the Princess of Wales (as Princess May had become). On the accession of King George V in 1910, Lady Airlie was retained at court as a Lady of the Bedchamber to the-now Queen Mary.

== World War I ==
During World War I she supported the Red Cross and was appointed a Dame Grand Cross of the Order of the British Empire (GBE) in the 1920 civilian war honours list for her services as president of Queen Alexandra's Army Nursing Board.

However, she suffered losses in her family during the war: her son-in-law, Clement (the eldest son of Bertram Freeman-Mitford, 1st Baron Redesdale), was killed in action in 1915, her youngest son, Patrick, was also killed in action in 1917 and her daughter, Mabell, was killed whilst exercising army horses in 1918.

== Later life ==
In 1953, the countess's employer and lifelong friend, Queen Mary, died, and Elizabeth II appointed her a Dame Grand Cross of the Royal Victorian Order (GCVO) for her many years of service. She later moved from Airlie Castle to Bayswater Road, London, in 1955. She died there a few weeks after her ninetieth birthday in 1956.

== Works ==
When Lady Airlie's eldest son married in 1917, she moved from Cortachy Castle to Airlie Castle and embarked on a career as an author. She published family letters, titled In Whig Society, 1775–1818 (1921) and Lady Palmerston and her Times (1922). The works were based on the papers of her great-grandmother, born Emily Lamb, a leading figure of the Almack's social set, sister to Prime Minister Lord Melbourne, wife to the 5th Earl Cowper, and subsequently wife to another Prime Minister Lord Palmerston. A later book, With the Guards We Shall Go (1933), detailed her great-uncle, John Jocelyn, 5th Earl of Roden, through the Crimean War.

As a confidante to Queen Mary, Lady Airlie was a close observer of the fluctuating relationships within the British royal family, and detailed her reminiscences about them in her memoirs. The unfinished manuscript was discovered after her death, and was published as Thatched with Gold: The Memoirs of Mabell, Countess of Airlie in 1962.

== Family ==
On 19 January 1886, Mabell Gore married an army officer, David Ogilvy, 11th Earl of Airlie, at St George's, Hanover Square, becoming the Countess of Airlie. They had six children.

- Lady Kitty Edith Blanche Ogilvy (5 February 1887 – 17 October 1969); married Brigadier General Sir Berkeley Vincent on 18 September 1906 and they were divorced in 1925. They had two sons. She remarried Lieutenant Colonel Ralph Gerald Ritson on 1 June 1926.
  - John Ogilvy Vincent (24 March 1911 – 1 May 1914)
  - Boris Ogilvy Vincent (1914–1914)
- Lady Helen Alice Wyllington Ogilvy (21 November 1890 – December 1973); By 1930s as Lady Helen Nutting she was involved with campaigning on women's status and rights, especially economic equality between husband and wife. A member of the Married Women's Association from 1945, she was deputy Chair in 1947. Left with colleagues in 1952 to set up Council of Married Women, Chair in 1953-1969. Married Major Clement Freeman-Mitford, son of the 1st Baron Redesdale, on 25 November 1909. They had two daughters. He was killed in action in 1915. She remarried Lieutenant Colonel Henry Brocklehurst on 11 July 1918 and they were divorced in 1931. She remarried, again, Lieutenant Colonel Harold Nutting on 21 February 1933.
  - Rosemary Freeman-Mitford (16 September 1911 – 22 October 2005); married Commander Richard Bailey on 29 October 1932. They had six children.
  - Clementine Freeman-Mitford (22 October 1915 – 17 August 2005); married Sir Alfred Lane Beit on 20 April 1939.
  - Sir John Brocklehurst, 3rd Bt. (6 April 1926 – 1981)
- Lady Mabell Griselda Esther Sudley Ogilvy (22 January 1892 – 4 November 1918)
- David Ogilvy, 12th Earl of Airlie (18 July 1893 – 28 December 1968); married Lady Alexandra Coke on 17 July 1917. They had six children.
- The Honourable Bruce Arthur Ashley Ogilvy (15 March 1895 – 29 September 1976); married Primrose O'Brien on 28 April 1931.
- The Honourable Patrick Julian Harry Stanley Ogilvy (26 June 1896 – 9 October 1917)

== Styles ==
- The Honourable Mabell Gore (1866–1884)
- Lady Mabell Gore (1884–1886)
- The Right Honourable The Countess of Airlie (1886–1917)
- The Right Honourable Mabell Ogilvy, Countess of Airlie (1917–1921)
- The Right Honourable The Dowager Countess of Airlie (1921–1956)

== Sources ==
- Zeepvat, Charlotte - Ogilvy (née Gore), Mabell Frances Elizabeth, countess of Airlie (1866–1956), courtier and literary editor, Oxford Dictionary of National Biography; accessed 23 June 2017.(subscription required)
