= Grand Central Hotel (disambiguation) =

Grand Central Hotel may refer to:

- Grand Central Hotel, a demolished New York City hotel
- Grand Central Hotel, Adelaide, demolished building in Pulteney Street, Adelaide, South Australia
- Grand Central Hotel Belfast, a partly demolished former hotel and military base
- Grand Central Hotel (Glasgow), a functioning hotel formerly called Central Hotel
- Grand Central Hotel (Las Vegas), a proposed hotel
- Grand Central Hotel (Omaha, Nebraska), a demolished hotel destroyed by fire
- Grand Central Hotel (Perth), a hotel and YWCA building

== See also ==
- Grand Central (disambiguation)
