= Edward Fielden =

Edward Fielden may refer to:

- Edward Fielden (RAF officer) (1903–1976), Royal Air Force pilot and World War II veteran
- Edward Fielden (politician) (1857–1942), British businessman and Conservative Party politician
