= Marina Ogilvy =

Daughter of Princess Alexandra (born 1966)

- Born: Marina Victoria Alexandra Ogilvy; 31 July 1966 (age 60); Thatched House Lodge, Richmond Park, London, England
- Spouse: Paul Julian Mowatt (m. 1990; div. 1997)
- Children: 2
- Parents: Princess Alexandra of Kent; Angus Ogilvy

Marina Victoria Alexandra Ogilvy (born 31 July 1966) is the younger child and only daughter of Sir Angus Ogilvy and Princess Alexandra of Kent. Her mother is a first cousin of late Queen Elizabeth II, both being granddaughters of King George V. As a result, she is a second cousin of King Charles III and 64th in the line of succession to the British throne as of August 2026.

== Early life ==
Marina was born at Thatched House Lodge in Richmond Park, London, the home of her parents, on 31 July 1966. She was named after her maternal grandmother, Princess Marina of Greece and Denmark, who was also a first cousin of Prince Philip, Duke of Edinburgh. She has an elder brother, James Ogilvy, who was born in 1964. She was baptised on 2 September 1966 at the Private Chapel at Kensington Palace by Arthur Michael Ramsey, Archbishop of Canterbury. Marina was educated at St Mary's School, Wantage. She is a talented pianist and graduated from the Royal College of Music.

== Marriage and children ==
In November 1989, Marina announced that she was pregnant by her boyfriend Paul Julian Mowatt (born in Hendon, 28 November 1962), a freelance photographer. She claimed that her parents tried to pressure her into having an abortion or a shotgun wedding, and that they cut off her funds and disowned her when she refused. She also said that she wrote a letter to Queen Elizabeth II, addressing her "Dear Cousin Lilibet", asking her to intervene in the family dispute. Marina's parents denied her allegations and said that they loved her, had not cut her off and that she was welcome at home any time.

Marina married Mowatt in Richmond Park, Surrey, on 2 February 1990, wearing a red velvet bolero with gold trim, with a black dress underneath, and a black hat. The wedding was attended by her parents and brother, but not by the Queen nor the Prince of Wales. They had two children: Zenouska May Mowatt (born 26 May 1990), and Christian Alexander Mowatt (born 4 June 1993) and divorced in October 1997.

Marina Ogilvy Born: 31 July 1966
Lines of succession
Preceded by Isabel Vesterberg	Succession to the British throne granddaughter of George, Duke of Kent great-granddaughter of George V	Succeeded by Christian Mowatt
