= James Ogilvy =

British landscape designer and publisher (born 1964)

- Born: 29 February 1964 (age 62); Thatched House Lodge, Richmond Park, Surrey, England
- Education: Heatherdown Preparatory School; Eton College
- Alma mater: University of St Andrews (MA); Cranfield University (MBA)
- Occupations: Landscape designer; magazine editor
- Spouse: Julia Rawlinson (m. 1988)
- Children: 2
- Parents: Princess Alexandra of Kent; Angus Ogilvy

James Robert Bruce Ogilvy (born 29 February 1964) is a British landscape designer, and the founder and editor of the magazine Luxury Briefing. He is a member of the extended British royal family as the elder child and only son of Princess Alexandra of Kent and Sir Angus Ogilvy. Queen Elizabeth II was a first cousin of his mother, both of whom were granddaughters of King George V. As a result, he is a second cousin of King Charles III and 60th in the line to the British throne.

== Early life and family ==
James Robert Bruce Ogilvy was born on Leap Year Day in 1964, making him a leapling. He was born in Thatched House Lodge, Richmond Park, Surrey. He was the first of four children born to royalty within a space of nine weeks in 1964, the others being Prince Edward, Lady Helen Windsor and Lady Sarah Armstrong-Jones. Ogilvy was baptised by Michael Ramsey, Archbishop of Canterbury, with Queen Elizabeth II among his seven godparents. At birth, he was 13th in line to the British throne. As of December 2025, he is 59th.

== Education and professional life ==
His education began in the "palace school" with his cousins Prince Edward, Lady Helen Windsor and Lady Sarah Armstrong-Jones. Subsequently, Ogilvy attended Gibbs pre-prep and Heatherdown Preparatory School (with Prince Edward). After that, Ogilvy and Prince Edward went separate ways, the prince to Gordonstoun and Cambridge, and Ogilvy to Eton College and the University of St Andrews. From St. Andrews, he earned a Scottish Master of Arts degree in History of art. He then attended the full-time MBA course at Cranfield from 1990 to 1991, obtaining the MBA qualification.

He worked for Barclays de Zoete Wedd (BZW) and then a shipping agency in Edinburgh.

He is the publisher and founder of Luxury Briefing, a magazine launched in 1996, and has served on numerous boards of directors.

Ogilvy is also a professional photographer and landscape designer.

== Personal life ==
Ogilvy married Julia Caroline Rawlinson, daughter of Charles Frederick Melville Rawlinson, of Arkesden, Essex, a merchant banker, on 30 July 1988 at St Mary's Church in Saffron Walden, Essex. They have two children:

- Flora Alexandra Vesterberg (born 15 December 1994 in Edinburgh, Scotland) who studied History of Art at the University of Bristol and has a master's degree from the Courtauld Institute of Art: she runs a contemporary art agency. She married Swedish financier Timothy Vesterberg at the Chapel Royal, St James's Palace, on 26 September 2020 and they renewed their vows the following year. She was diagnosed with autism in 2025. She gave birth to her daughter Isabel Marina Vesterberg on 8 July 2026.
- Alexander Charles Ogilvy (born 12 November 1996 in Edinburgh, Scotland) who attended Brown University in Providence, Rhode Island. He attended Sandhurst and was commissioned a second lieutenant in the Blues and Royals (Royal Horse Guards and 1st Dragoons) in August 2025.

He is also the godfather of Princess Eugenie, the younger daughter of his second cousin, Andrew Mountbatten-Windsor, and Sarah Ferguson.

In 1997, while on holiday in Florida with his wife and children, he swam out into the ocean and was bitten by a shark. Ogilvy had several leg wounds and required 30 stitches.

== Ancestry ==
His maternal grandparents were Prince George, Duke of Kent, the fourth son of King George V; and Princess Marina of Greece and Denmark. Princess Marina was the daughter of Prince Nicholas of Greece and Denmark and Grand Duchess Elena Vladimirovna of Russia (later known as Princess Nicholas of Greece and Denmark). He has a younger sister, Marina Ogilvy. His paternal grandparents were the 12th Earl of Airlie and Lady Alexandra Coke, daughter of the 3rd Earl of Leicester.

== Honours ==
- 6 February 1977: Queen Elizabeth II Silver Jubilee Medal
- 6 February 2002: Queen Elizabeth II Golden Jubilee Medal
- 6 February 2012: Queen Elizabeth II Diamond Jubilee Medal
- 6 February 2022: Queen Elizabeth II Platinum Jubilee Medal
- 6 May 2023: King Charles III Coronation Medal

James Ogilvy Born: 29 February 1964
Lines of succession
Preceded by Princess Alexandra	Succession to the British throne grandson of George, Duke of Kent great-grandson of George V	Succeeded by Alexander Ogilvy
