= Princess Alexandra of Kent =

British princess (born 1936)

Princess Alexandra
- The Hon. Lady Ogilvy (more)
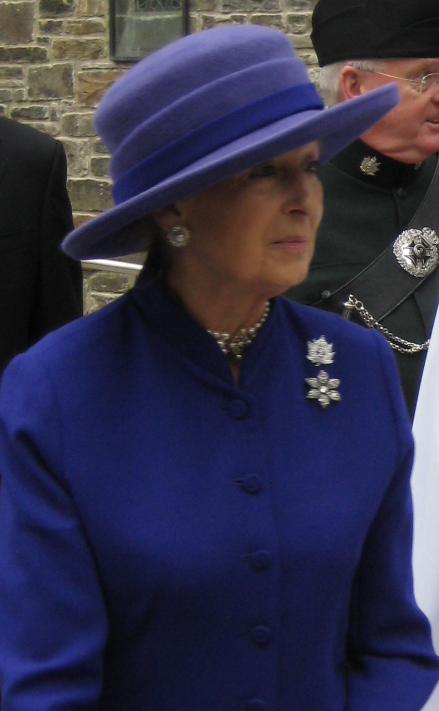
- Alexandra in 2010
- Born: Princess Alexandra of Kent; 25 December 1936 (age 89); Belgravia, London, England
- Spouse: Angus Ogilvy (m. 1963; died 2004)
- Issue: James Ogilvy; Marina Ogilvy
Names
- Alexandra Helen Elizabeth Olga Christabel
- House: Windsor
- Father: Prince George, Duke of Kent
- Mother: Princess Marina of Greece and Denmark

Princess Alexandra, The Honourable Lady Ogilvy (Alexandra Helen Elizabeth Olga Christabel; born 25 December 1936), is a member of the British royal family. She is the only daughter of Prince George, Duke of Kent, and Princess Marina of Greece and Denmark, the only living granddaughter of George V, a niece of Edward VIII and George VI, and a first cousin of Elizabeth II. Alexandra's mother was also a first cousin of Prince Philip, Duke of Edinburgh, consort of Elizabeth II, making her both a second cousin and first cousin once removed of Charles III.

Alexandra was married to the businessman Sir Angus Ogilvy from 1963 until his death in 2004. At the time of her birth, she was sixth in the line of succession to the British throne; as of 2026, she is 59th.

== Early life ==
Alexandra was born at 11:20 am on Christmas Day 1936 at 3 Belgrave Square, London, the second child and only daughter of Prince George, Duke of Kent, the fourth son of King George V and Queen Mary, and Princess Marina of Greece and Denmark, a daughter of Prince Nicholas of Greece and Denmark and Grand Duchess Elena Vladimirovna of Russia. She was named after her paternal great-grandmother, Queen Alexandra; her grandmother, Grand Duchess Elena Vladimirovna of Russia; and both of her maternal aunts, Countess Elizabeth of Törring-Jettenbach and Princess Olga of Yugoslavia. She received the name Christabel because she was born on Christmas Day, like her aunt Princess Alice, Duchess of Gloucester. Her birth was the last at which the Home Secretary was required to be present to verify the arrival of potential heirs to the throne. John Simon attended, and was the final holder of the office to do so.

As a male-line granddaughter of the British monarch, she was styled as a British princess with the prefix Her Royal Highness. At the time of her birth she was sixth in the line of succession to the British throne, behind her cousins Princess Elizabeth (later Queen Elizabeth II) and Princess Margaret, her uncle the Duke of Gloucester, her father the Duke of Kent, and her elder brother Prince Edward. She was born two weeks after the abdication of her uncle King Edward VIII.

Alexandra was baptised in the Private Chapel at Buckingham Palace on 9 February 1937, and her godparents were King George VI and Queen Elizabeth (her paternal uncle and aunt); the Queen of Norway (her great-aunt); Princess Nicholas of Greece and Denmark (her maternal grandmother); Princess Olga of Yugoslavia (her maternal aunt); Princess Beatrice (her paternal great-great-aunt); the Earl of Athlone (her paternal great-uncle); and Count Karl Theodor of Törring-Jettenbach (her maternal uncle by marriage). Of her godparents, only the King and Queen and Lord Athlone were present.

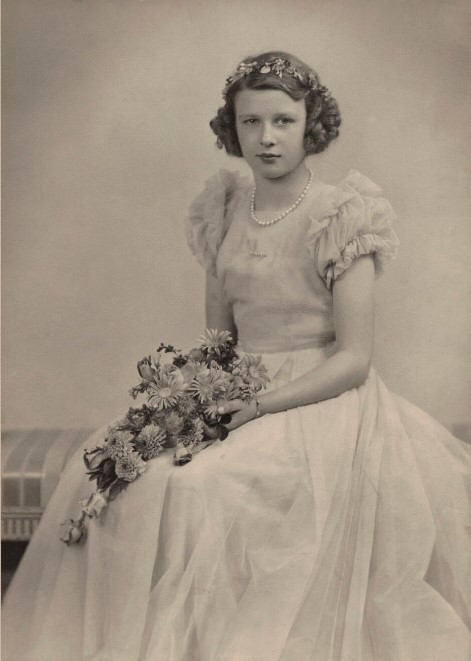
Alexandra aged 11 by Hay Wrightson

Alexandra spent most of her childhood at her family's country house, Coppins, in Buckinghamshire. During the Second World War she also lived at Badminton with her widowed grandmother Queen Mary. Her father was killed in an aeroplane crash in Caithness, Scotland, on 25 August 1942 whilst serving in the Royal Air Force. Alexandra has the distinction of being the first British princess to have attended a boarding school, Heathfield School near Ascot. She later studied in Paris, and received training at Great Ormond Street Hospital.

== Marriage and personal life ==
On 24 April 1963, Alexandra married The Hon. Angus James Bruce Ogilvy (1928–2004), the second son of David Ogilvy, 12th Earl of Airlie, and Lady Alexandra Coke, at Westminster Abbey. Ogilvy presented Alexandra with an engagement ring made of a cabochon sapphire set in gold and surrounded by diamonds on both sides. The wedding ceremony was attended by the royal family and was broadcast worldwide on television, watched by an estimated 200 million people.

The bride wore a wedding gown of Valenciennes lace, with matching veil and train, designed by John Cavanagh. Alexandra travelled with her brother, the Duke of Kent, from Kensington Palace to Westminster Abbey. The bridesmaids included Princess Anne and Archduchess Elisabeth of Austria, and the best man was Peregrine Fairfax. The Archbishop of Canterbury, Michael Ramsey, conducted the service. Ogilvy declined the Queen's offer to be created an earl upon marriage, so the couple's children carry no titles.

Ogilvy was knighted in 1988 (when Alexandra assumed the style of The Hon. Lady Ogilvy), and was sworn of the Privy Council in 1997. Alexandra and Ogilvy had two children:

- James Robert Bruce Ogilvy (born 29 February 1964 at Thatched House Lodge, Richmond Park, Surrey). He married Julia Caroline Rawlinson on 30 July 1988 at St Mary's Church in Saffron Walden, Essex. They have two children.
  - Flora Vesterberg (née Ogilvy; born 15 December 1994 in Edinburgh, Scotland) who studied History of Arts at the University of Bristol and has a master's degree from the Courtauld Institute of Arts: she runs a contemporary art agency. She married Swedish financier Timothy Vesterberg at Chapel Royal, St. James's Palace, on 26 September 2020 and they renewed their vows the following year. She was diagnosed with autism in 2025. The couple have one child.
    - Isabel Marina Vesterberg (born 8 July 2026)
  - Alexander Charles Ogilvy (born 12 November 1996 in Edinburgh, Scotland) who attended Brown University in Providence, Rhode Island. He attended Sandhurst and was commissioned a second lieutenant in Blues and Royals (Royal Horse Guards and 1st Dragoons) in August 2025.
- Marina Victoria Alexandra Ogilvy (born 31 July 1966 in Thatched House Lodge, Richmond Park, Surrey). She married Paul Julian Mowatt (Hendon, 28 November 1962) on 2 February 1990; they divorced on 15 October 1997. They have two children.
  - Zenouska May Mowatt (born 26 May 1990)
  - Christian Alexander Ogilvy (born 4 June 1993)

Marina's first pregnancy, announced in late 1989, caused controversy as the couple were not married. The situation led to a feud with her parents, who suggested that Marina either marry her companion in a shotgun wedding or have an abortion. In an interview with a tabloid at the time, Marina claimed that her parents had cut off her trust fund and monthly allowance due to their disapproval of her conduct. She also said that she wrote a letter to Queen Elizabeth II, addressing her "Dear Cousin Lilibet", asking the Queen to intervene in the family dispute. Marina's parents denied her allegations, stating that they loved her, had not cut her off, and that she was welcome at home at any time.

== Activities ==
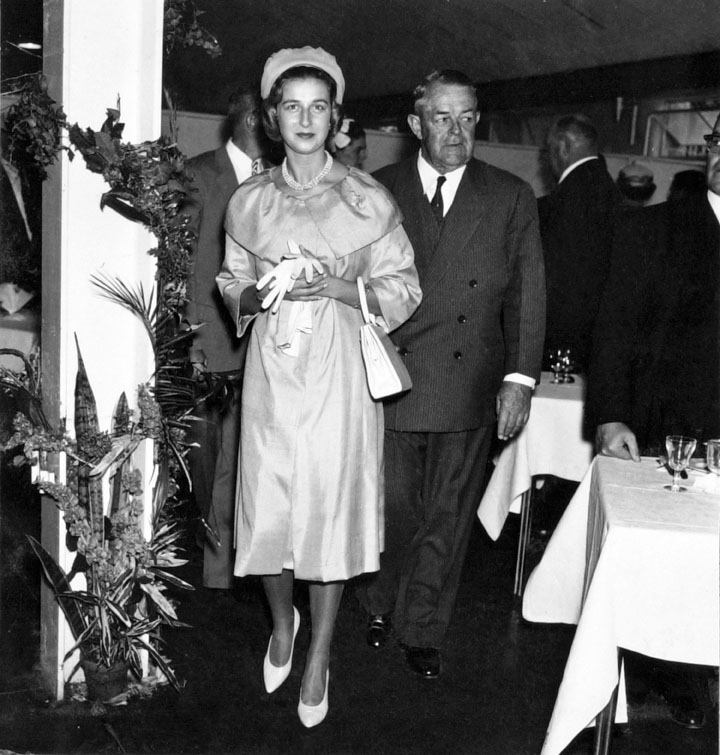
Princess Alexandra on her tour of Australia in 1959

Beginning in the late 1950s, Alexandra undertook an extensive programme of engagements in support of the Queen, both in the United Kingdom and overseas. Taking part in roughly 120 engagements each year, she became one of the most active members of the royal family. She carried out 110 engagements in 2012, but in April 2013 she cancelled her programme due to polymyalgia rheumatica. As of 2022, she remained listed as a working member of the royal family, attending numerous ceremonial and charitable engagements.

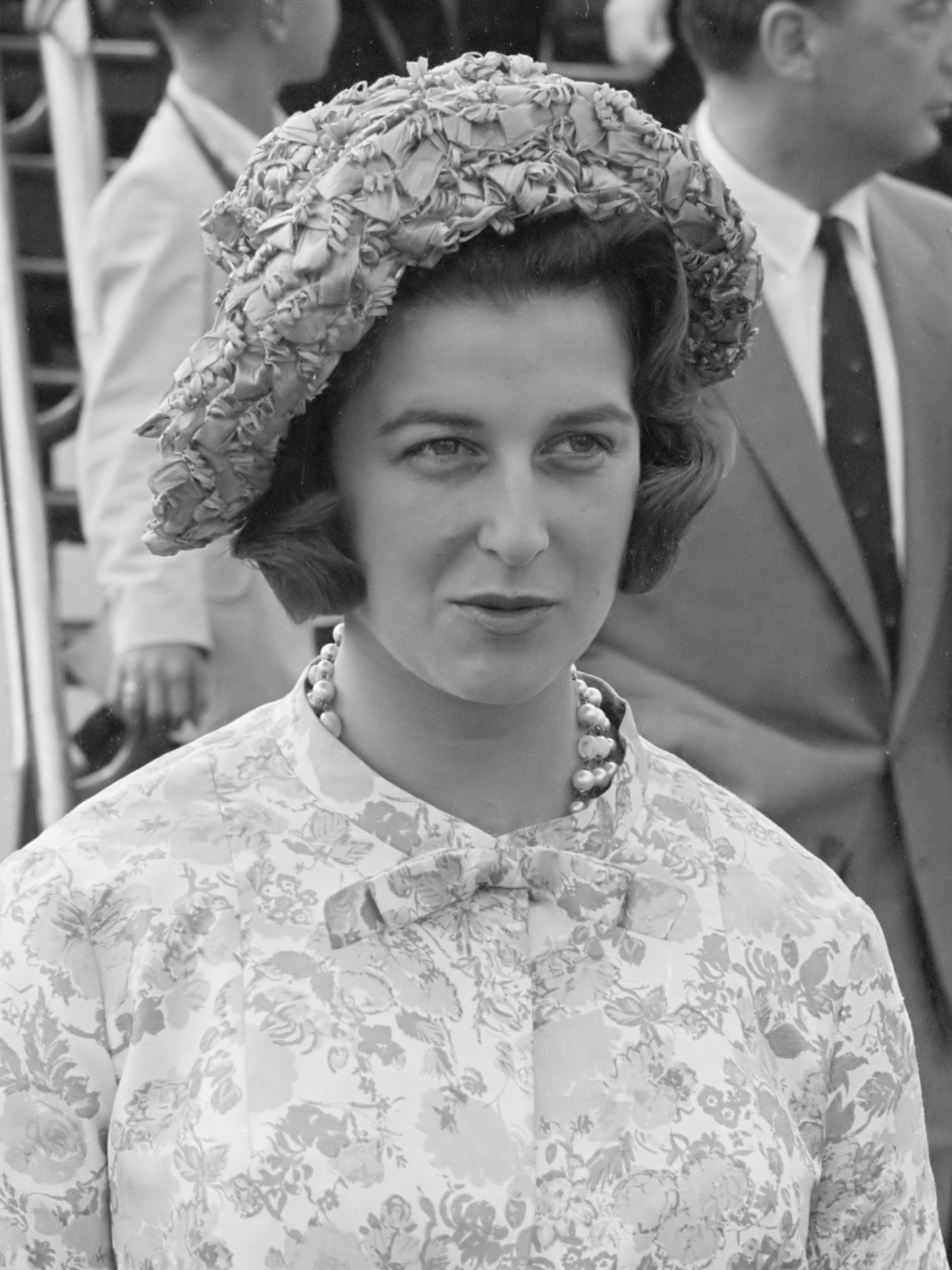
Princess Alexandra of Kent on a visit to the Netherlands in June 1961

In 1959, she undertook a major tour of Australia and attended the Queensland Centenary Celebrations. The "Alexandra Waltz" was composed for the visit by radio announcer Russ Tyson and television musical director Clyde Collins, and was sung for the princess by the teenage Gay Kahler, who later performed under the name Gay Kayler. In 1961, Alexandra visited Hong Kong, including stops at Aberdeen Fish Market, Lok Ma Chau police station, and So Uk Estate, a public housing complex. She returned to Australia in 1967 for a private holiday, during which she also carried out engagements in Canberra and Melbourne. The Princess Alexandra Hospital in Brisbane is named in her honour.

Alexandra represented Queen Elizabeth II, on 1 October 1960 when Nigeria gained independence from the United Kingdom , and she opened Nigeria's first Parliament on 3 October. Later overseas tours included visits to Canada, Italy, Oman, Hungary, Norway, Japan, Thailand, Gibraltar, and the Falkland Islands. In 1965, she launched the New Zealand Leander-class frigate HMNZS Waikato at Harland and Wolff in Belfast, Northern Ireland. She opened the Victoria-to-Brixton section of London Underground's Victoria line on 23 July 1971. In May 1973, she presented the Scottish Cup to Rangers following the 1973 Scottish Cup Final. She again represented the Queen at the celebrations marking Saint Lucia's independence from the UK in 1979.

Alexandra opened the new hospital in Harlow, Essex, named in her honour, on 27 April 1965. The Princess Alexandra Hospital NHS Trust was announced by the Prime Minister, Boris Johnson, in September 2019 as part of the government's new health infrastructure programme to build a replacement hospital.

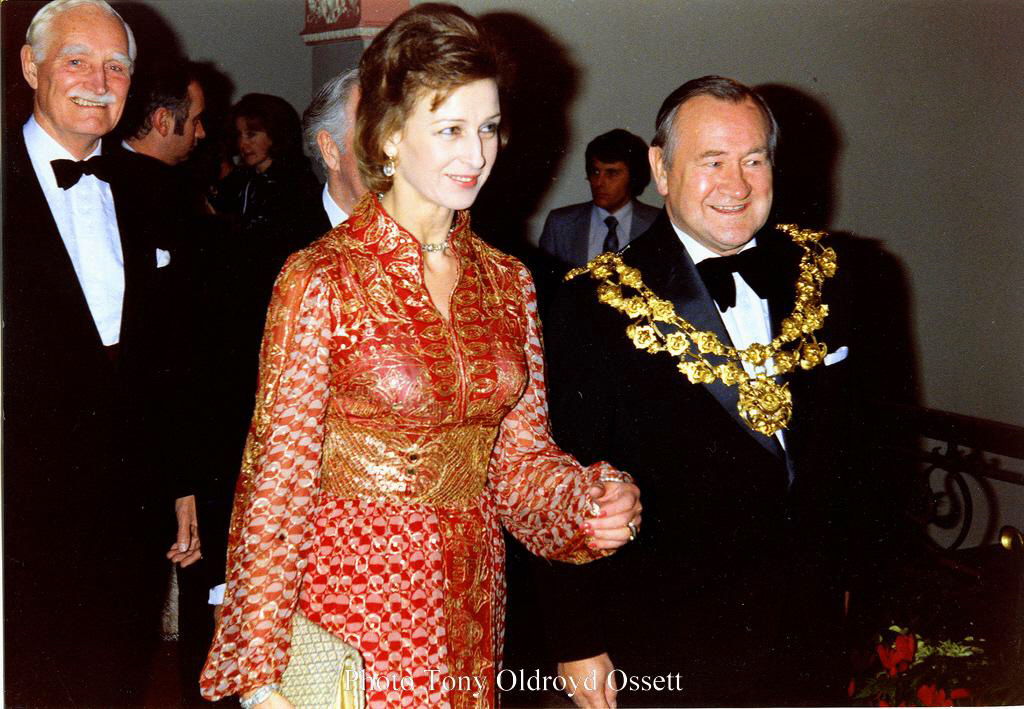
Princess Alexandra in Ossett in 1977

She served as chancellor of Lancaster University from its foundation in 1964 until she relinquished the post in 2004, when she also accepted an honorary degree in music. She was the first chancellor of the University of Mauritius. Alexandra is an honorary fellow of the Royal College of Physicians and Surgeons of Glasgow, the Faculty of Anaesthetists of the Royal College of Surgeons of England, the Royal College of Obstetricians and Gynaecologists, and the Royal College of Physicians. She is president of Alexandra Rose Day, founded in honour of her great-grandmother, Queen Alexandra, and was patron of The Royal School, Hampstead. She served as president of WWF-UK until 2011.

Until its abolition in 2013, she received £225,000 per year from the Civil List to cover the cost of official expenses, although, as with other members of the royal family (except the Duke of Edinburgh), the Queen repaid this amount to HM Treasury. Alexandra lives at Thatched House Lodge in Richmond, London, a Crown property purchased on a 150-year lease from the Crown Estate Commissioners by Angus Ogilvy after their wedding in 1963. She also has the use of a grace-and-favour apartment at St James's Palace.

She is the patron of the Blackie Foundation Trust, a charity dedicated to the promotion of research and education in homoeopathy. She is also patron of the People's Dispensary for Sick Animals; the English National Opera; the London Philharmonic Choir; the Bournemouth Symphony Orchestra; Wigmore Hall; the Florence Nightingale Foundation; the not-for-profit housing association Anchor; the charity Independent Age; St Christopher's Hospice in Sydenham; Core, a national charity funding research into digestive diseases; the Nature in Art Trust; and the London Academy of Music and Dramatic Art (LAMDA), the oldest drama school in the English-speaking world. She has been patron of the Royal Alexandra Children's Hospital in Brighton since 1954 and of Alzheimer's Society since 1990. Alexandra is also the royal patron of Children and Families Across Borders (CFAB), a charity dedicated to reuniting children separated from their families. She is patron of the Royal Central School of Speech and Drama in London, which received its royal style in 2012 during the Queen's Diamond Jubilee. In her role as president of Sightsavers UK, she visited Washington D.C. in October 2016 to attend the Neglected Tropical Diseases NGDO Network conference partnership reception. In November 2016, one month before Alexandra's 80th birthday, the Queen held a reception at Buckingham Palace in honour of her charitable work.

In May 2023, she appeared alongside other working members of the royal family in photographs taken in the Throne Room and on the Buckingham Palace balcony following the coronation of King Charles III, which she had attended earlier that day. In February 2024, she began using a wheelchair and attended a thanksgiving service for Constantine II of Greece later that month. In June 2025, she joined King Charles for a church service in the Queen's Chapel in London, sitting beside the King to mark the chapel's 400th anniversary celebration. In April 2026, Alexandra attended a commemorative reception held to mark the centenary of Queen Elizabeth II's birth, continuing to be a working member of the British royal family.

== Titles, styles, honours and arms ==
Alexandra's monogram

=== Titles and styles ===
Alexandra is often referred to simply as Her Royal Highness Princess Alexandra. She has held the following styles officially:

- Her Royal Highness Princess Alexandra of Kent
- Her Royal Highness Princess Alexandra, The Honourable Mrs Angus Ogilvy
- Her Royal Highness Princess Alexandra, The Honourable Lady Ogilvy

=== Honours ===
- 1951: Recipient of the Royal Family Order of George VI (the Princess is the final living recipient of this order)
- 25 December 1952: Recipient of the Royal Family Order of Elizabeth II
- 2 June 1953: Recipient of the Queen Elizabeth II Coronation Medal
- 25 December 1960: Dame Grand Cross of the Royal Victorian Order (GCVO)
- 6 February 1977: Recipient of the Queen Elizabeth II Silver Jubilee Medal
- 23 April 2003: Royal Knight Companion of the Order of the Garter (KG) (Note: The original announcement made regarding her appointment in 2003 describes her as a "Lady Companion of the Most Noble Order of the Garter", but her official biography states that she was "made a Knight of the Order of the Garter (KG) in 2003".)
- 1967: Recipient of the Order of the Dogwood
- 1972: Recipient of the Canadian Forces' Decoration (CD) with 5 Clasps

==== Eponyms ====
- The Alexandra Hospital in Redditch, Worcestershire, is named after the Princess; she opened it in April 1987.
- The Princess Alexandra Hospital in Harlow, Essex, was named by the Princess on 27 April 1965.
- The Princess Alexandra Hospital (formerly South Brisbane Hospital) was named by and in honour of the visit by the Princess to Queensland in 1959.
- The Princess Alexandra Gardens at Leeds Castle are named after her in honour of her involvement as Patron of the Leeds Castle Foundation.

==== Appointments ====
Academic

- 1964–2004: University of Lancaster, Chancellor
- 1974–1985: University of Mauritius, Chancellor

Honorary academic degrees

- University of Queensland, Doctor of Laws
- University of Hong Kong, Doctor of Laws
- University of Mauritius, Doctor of Laws
- University of Liverpool, Doctor of Laws
- University of Lancaster, Doctor of Musical Arts

Civic

- Honorary Fellow of the Royal College of Physicians and Surgeons of Glasgow
- Honorary Fellow of the Royal College of Anaesthetists
- Honorary Fellow of the Royal College of Obstetricians and Gynaecologists
- Honorary Fellow of the Royal College of Physicians
- Royal Honorary Freeman of the Worshipful Company of Barbers
- Honorary Freeman of the Worshipful Company of Clothworkers

==== Honorary military appointments ====
Canada

- 1960–2010: Colonel-in-Chief, The Queen's Own Rifles of Canada
- (Canada) 1977: Colonel-in-Chief, The Canadian Scottish Regiment (Princess Mary's)

United Kingdom

- (United Kingdom) 1955: Patron, Queen Alexandra's Royal Naval Nursing Service
- (United Kingdom) 1998: Sponsor of HMS Kent (F78)
- (United Kingdom) 1957–1968: Colonel-in-Chief, of Durham Light Infantry
- (United Kingdom) 1968–2002: Deputy Colonel-in-Chief, of Light Infantry
- (United Kingdom) 1977–2006: Colonel-in-Chief, of King's Own Royal Border Regiment
- (United Kingdom) 2002–2007: Colonel-in-Chief, of Light Infantry
- (United Kingdom) 1967: Honorary Colonel, of the North Irish Horse
- (United Kingdom) 1969–1993: Colonel-in-Chief, of the 17th/21st Lancers
- (United Kingdom) 1975: Royal Honorary Colonel, of The Royal Yeomanry
- (United Kingdom) 1992: Deputy Colonel-in-Chief, of The Queen's Royal Lancers
- (United Kingdom) 2007: Royal Colonel, 3rd Battalion The Rifles
- (United Kingdom) 1966: Patron and Air Chief Commandant, of Princess Mary's Royal Air Force Nursing Service
- (United Kingdom) 2000–2013: Honorary Air Commodore, of RAF Cottesmore

Hong Kong

- 1969–1997: Commandant General, Royal Hong Kong Police Force

=== Arms ===
Coat of arms of Princess Alexandra of Kent
Notes As a descendant of George V, Princess Alexandra's arms are based on the Royal Arms. The following explains the way in which her arms are differenced from those of the monarch. Adopted 1961 Coronet Coronet of a Grandchild of the Sovereign Crest On the coronet of children of other sons of the Sovereign, composed of four crosses-pattées alternated with four strawberry leaves a lion statant guardant or, crowned with the like coronet and differenced with a label as in the Arms. Escutcheon The Royal Arms differenced with a five-point label—the standard differentiation for a male-line grandchild of a British Monarch. The first and fifth points bear a heart gules, the second and fourth points bear an anchor azure, and the third point bears a cross gules. Supporters The Royal Supporters differenced with the like coronet and label. Orders The Order of the Garter circlet. HONI SOIT QUI MAL Y PENSE (Shame be to him who thinks evil of it) Banner The Royal Standard of the United Kingdom labelled for difference as in her arms. (in Scotland) Symbolism As with the Royal Arms of the United Kingdom. The first and fourth quarters are the arms of England, the second of Scotland, the third of Ireland.

== Issue ==
Name	Birth	Marriage		Issue
James Ogilvy	29 February 1964	30 July 1988	Julia Caroline Rawlinson	Flora Alexandra Vesterberg; Alexander Charles Ogilvy
Marina Ogilvy	31 July 1966	2 February 1990; Divorced 15 October 1997	Paul Julian Mowatt	Zenouska May Mowatt; Christian Alexander Mowatt

== Bibliography ==
- Collis, Rose (2010). The New Encyclopaedia of Brighton. (based on the original by Tim Carder) (1st ed.). Brighton: Brighton & Hove Libraries. ISBN 978-0-9564664-0-2.
- Panton, Kenneth J. (2011). Historical Dictionary of the British Monarchy. Scarecrow Press, Inc. ISBN 978-0-8108-5779-7.

Princess Alexandra of Kent House of Windsor Born: 25 December 1936
Lines of succession
Preceded by Lady Gabriella Kingston	Line of succession to the British throne daughter of George, Duke of Kent granddaughter of George V	Succeeded by James Ogilvy
Order of precedence in England and Wales and in Northern Ireland
Preceded by Lady Sarah Chatto	Ladies; HRH Princess Alexandra, The Hon Lady Ogilvy	Succeeded by Sarah Mullally as Archbishop of Canterbury
Order of precedence in Scotland
Preceded by Lady Sarah Chatto	Ladies; HRH Princess Alexandra, The Hon Lady Ogilvy	Succeeded by Local precedence
Academic offices
New title	Chancellor of the University of Lancaster; 1964–2004	Succeeded by Chris Bonington
