= Angus Ogilvy =

British businessman (1928–2004)

The Right Honourable Sir Angus Ogilvy KCVO
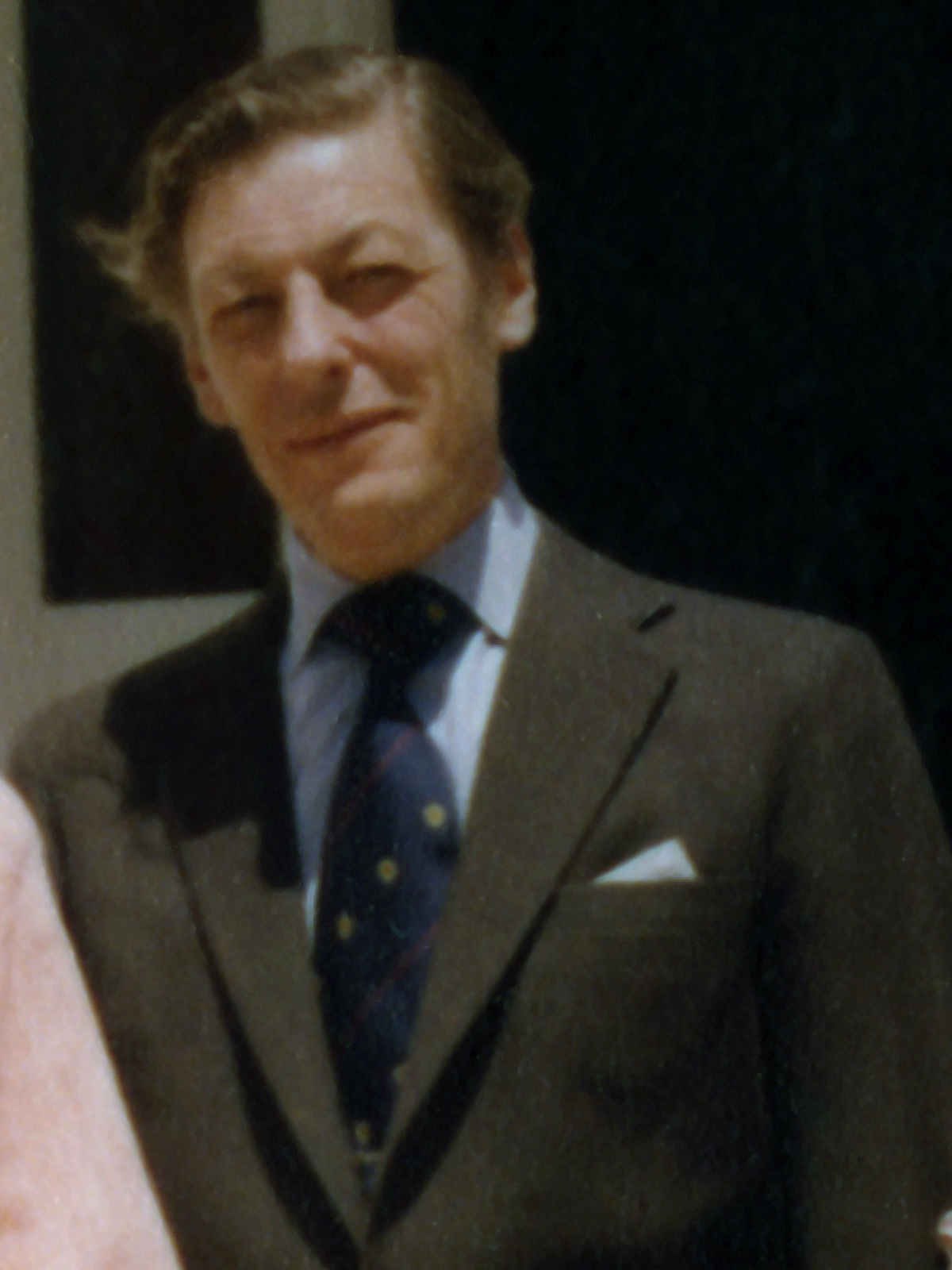
- Ogilvy in 1978
- Born: 14 September 1928; London, England
- Died: 26 December 2004 (aged 76); London, England
- Burial place: Royal Burial Ground, Frogmore
- Education: Trinity College, Oxford
- Occupation: Businessman
- Spouse: Princess Alexandra of Kent (m. 1963)
- Children: James Ogilvy; Marina Ogilvy
- Parents: David Ogilvy, 12th Earl of Airlie; Lady Alexandra Coke

Sir Angus James Bruce Ogilvy (14 September 1928 – 26 December 2004) was a British businessman, courtier, and philanthropist. He is best known as the husband of Princess Alexandra of Kent. Ogilvy is also remembered for his role in a business scandal, known as the Lonrho affair, involving the breaking of sanctions against Rhodesia during the 1970s. In later years, he was involved in charity work.

== Early life and family ==
Angus James Bruce Ogilvy was born on 14 September 1928 in St George Hanover Square, the second son of the 12th Earl of Airlie and Lady Alexandra Coke, daughter of the 3rd Earl of Leicester. Many of his relations had close links with the British royal family.

His grandmother, Mabell Ogilvy, Countess of Airlie, was a close friend and lady-in-waiting to Queen Mary. His father was a lord-in-waiting to George V and Lord Chamberlain to Queen Elizabeth (later the Queen Mother).

== Education and national service ==
Ogilvy was educated at Heatherdown School, near Ascot in Berkshire, and later at Eton College (also in Berkshire). During his National service, he was trained as a cadet at the Mons Officer Cadet School and on 26 July 1947 was commissioned as a second lieutenant into the Scots Guards. In October 1947, he joined Trinity College, Oxford, graduating BA in 1950 in Philosophy, Politics, and Economics (PPE).

== Career ==
After Oxford, Ogilvy worked at Harold Drayton's Drayton Group and later with the future tycoon Tiny Rowland at Drayton's subsidiary, London and Rhodesia Mining and Land Company (Lonrho). Responding to a court case in 1973, in which the judge questioned the company's management style, then-prime minister Edward Heath, described the company in the House of Commons as "an unpleasant and unacceptable face of capitalism".

In the 1970s Ogilvy was a director of The Rank Organisation. Ogilvy's business career ended in 1976, after he was criticised in a Department of Trade report into the activities of Lonrho.

After his business career was blighted, Ogilvy was involved with charity work. He served as president of the Imperial Cancer Research Fund and as chairman of Youth Clubs UK, the biggest non-uniformed youth organisation in Britain. He was patron of Arthritis Care, vice-patron of the National Children's Homes, chairman of the advisory council of The Prince's Trust, a trustee of the Leeds Castle Foundation, as well as being a member of the governing council of Business in the Community and of the Society for Promoting Christian Knowledge. He was also a member of the Royal Company of Archers, the Sovereign's Bodyguard in Scotland, in which his father had served as one of its four lieutenants.

== Personal life ==
On 24 April 1963, Ogilvy married Princess Alexandra of Kent, a granddaughter of King George V and Queen Mary, and a cousin of Queen Elizabeth II, at Westminster Abbey in London. The wedding ceremony was attended by all the members of the royal family and was broadcast worldwide on television, watched by an estimated 200 million people.

Elizabeth offered Ogilvy an earldom on his wedding, which he declined. He also rejected a grace-and-favour apartment at one of the royal palaces. Instead, he leased Thatched House Lodge in Richmond from the Crown Estate, where he lived with Alexandra, who still resides there. She retained a grace-and-favour apartment at St James's Palace.

The couple had two children:

- James Robert Bruce Ogilvy (born 29 February 1964 at Thatched House Lodge, Richmond Park, Surrey). He married Julia Caroline Rawlinson on 30 July 1988 at St Mary's Church in Saffron Walden, Essex. They have two children.
  - Flora Vesterberg (née Ogilvy; born 15 December 1994 in Edinburgh, Scotland) who studied History of Arts at the University of Bristol and has a master's degree from the Courtauld Institute of Arts: she runs a contemporary art agency. She married Swedish financier Timothy Vesterberg at Chapel Royal, St. James's Palace, on 26th September 2020 and they renewed their vows the following year. She was diagnosed with autism in 2025. The couple have one child.
    - Isabel Marina Vesterberg (born 8 July 2026)
  - Alexander Charles Ogilvy (born 12 November 1996 in Edinburgh, Scotland) who attended Brown University in Providence, Rhode Island. He attended Sandhurst and was commissioned a second lieutenant in Blues and Royals (Royal Horse Guards and 1st Dragoons) in August 2025.
- Marina Victoria Alexandra Ogilvy (born 31 July 1966 in Thatched House Lodge, Richmond Park, Surrey). She married Paul Julian Mowatt (Hendon, 28 November 1962) on 2 February 1990; they divorced on 15 October 1997. They have two children.
  - Zenouska May Mowatt (born 26 May 1990)
  - Christian Alexander Ogilvy (born 4 June 1993)

Marina's first pregnancy, which was announced in late 1989, caused a controversy as the couple were not married. This resulted in a feud with her parents who suggested she either marry her companion on a shotgun wedding or have an abortion. In an interview with a tabloid at the time, Marina had claimed that her parents had cut off her trust fund and monthly allowance due to their disapproval of her conduct. She also said that she wrote a letter to Queen Elizabeth II, addressing her "Dear Cousin Lilibet", asking her to intervene in the family dispute. Marina's parents denied her allegations and said that they loved her, had not cut her off and that she was welcome at home any time.

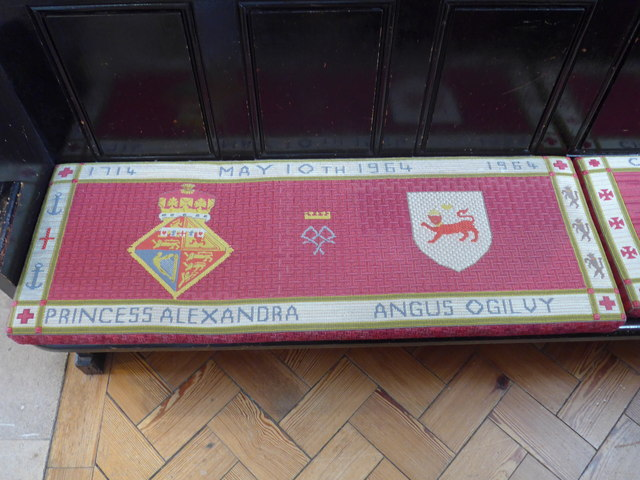
Pew cushion in St Anne's Church, Kew dedicated to Angus Ogilvy and Princess Alexandra

Ogilvy and his wife attended a special service at St Anne's Church, Kew, on Sunday 10 May 1964, to mark the church's 250th anniversary. A pew cushion in the church is embroidered with their names and coats of arms.

Ogilvy suffered from throat cancer in his later years, and his last public appearance with his wife was when he accompanied her to Thailand for an official tour.

Ogilvy died in Kingston upon Thames, Greater London, on 26 December 2004 after spending three months in hospital with cancer-related illnesses, including acute pneumonia. His funeral took place at St. George's Chapel, Windsor Castle on 5 January 2005. He was buried in the Royal Burial Ground, Frogmore, at Windsor.

== Honours and arms ==
Sir Angus Ogilvy's arms

- KCVO: Knight Commander of the Royal Victorian Order, 31 December 1988
- PC: Privy Counsellor, 31 December 1996

Ribbons of Sir Angus Ogilvy

Country	Date	Appointment	Ribbon	Post-nominal letters	Notes
United Kingdom	2 June 1953	Queen Elizabeth II Coronation Medal			
United Kingdom	Between 1946 and 1948	Defence Medal			
United Kingdom	6 February 1977	Queen Elizabeth II Silver Jubilee Medal			
United Kingdom	31 December 1988	Knight Commander of the Royal Victorian Order		KCVO	
United Kingdom	6 February 2002	Queen Elizabeth II Golden Jubilee Medal			
