= Air transport of the British royal family and government =

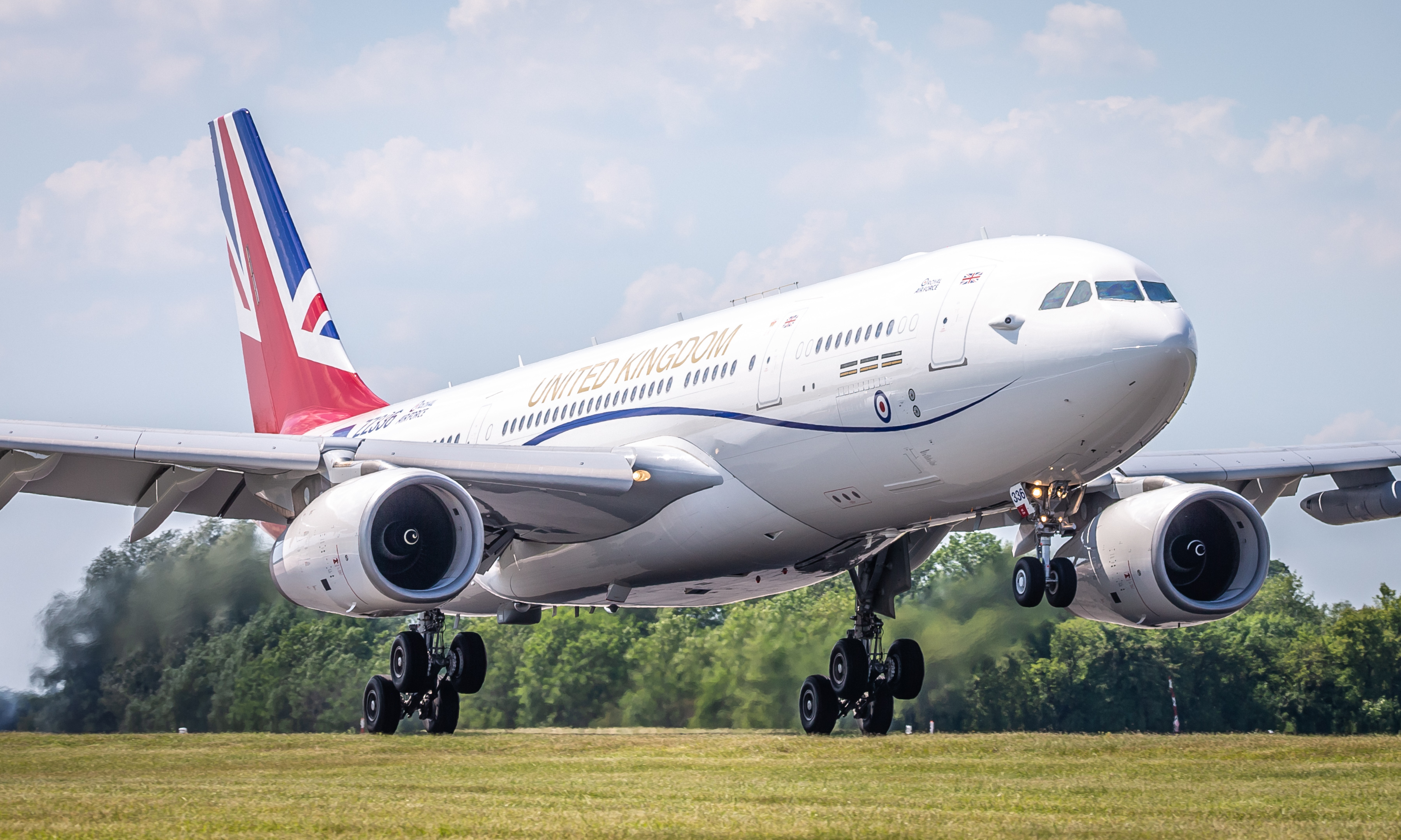
The RAF's VIP Airbus A330 MRTT (RAF Voyager KC3), ZZ336, landing at RAF Brize Norton in 2020.

Air transport of the British royal family and government is provided, depending on the circumstances and availability, by a variety of military and civilian operators. This includes an Airbus Voyager of the Royal Air Force (RAF), No. 10 Squadron, and the King's Helicopter Flight, which forms part of the Royal Household. Civil aircraft and scheduled commercial flights are also used. Historically, the aircraft for British royalty became known as the King's Flight or Queen's Flight.

== History ==
=== Royal family ===
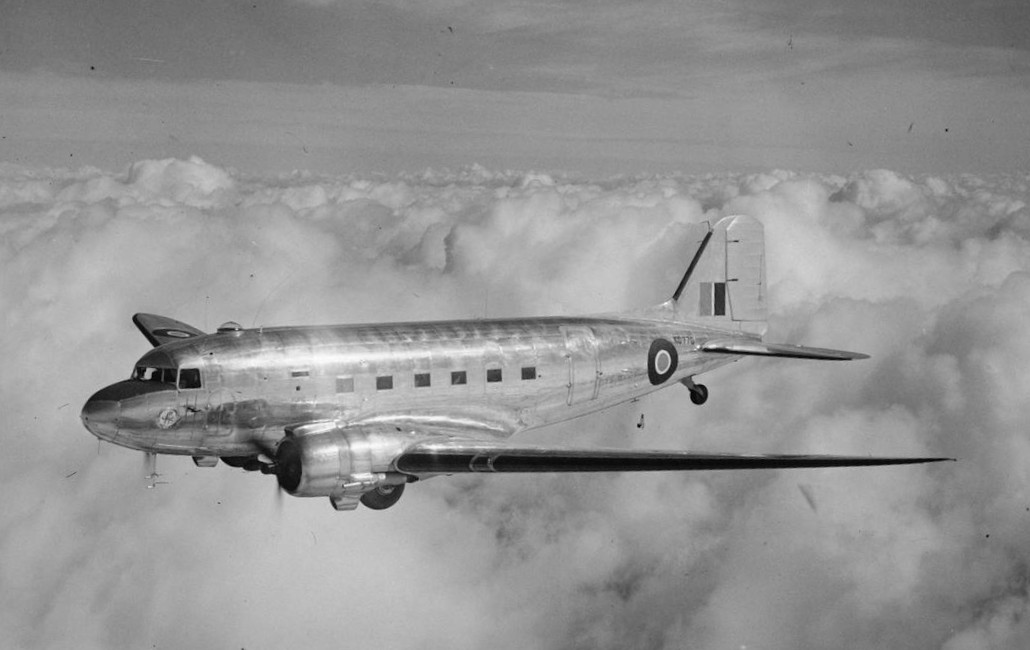
An RAF Douglas Dakota C.III taking King George VI and his consort, Queen Elizabeth, to the Channel Islands in 1945

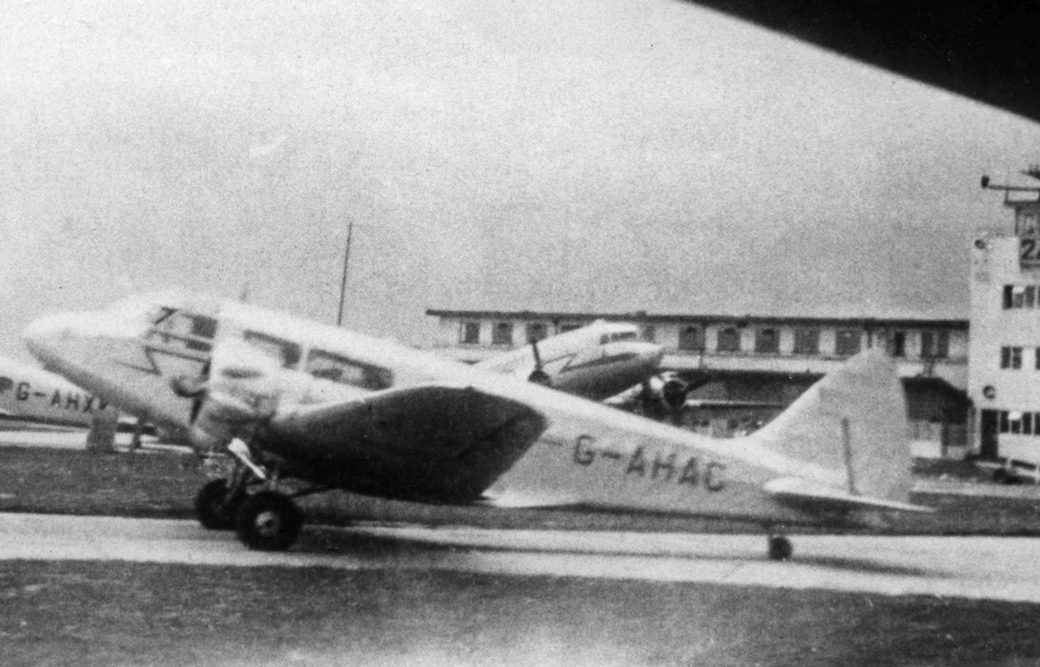
The last surviving Airspeed Envoy, operated by Private Charter Ltd at Manchester (Ringway) Airport in 1948.

The first aircraft ordered specifically for transport of the royal family, two Westland Wapitis, were delivered to No. 24 Squadron at RAF Northolt in April 1928. Although the Royal Air Force maintained at least one of these aircraft for a time, the Prince of Wales eventually became solely responsible for the aircraft. When the Prince ascended to the throne in 1936 as Edward VIII, The King's Flight was formed as the world's first head of state aircraft unit. This unit initially used the King's own de Havilland Dragon Rapide, commanded by the prince's personal pilot, Edward 'Mouse' Fielden, who continued to lead the flight before and after the war.

In May 1937, an AS.6J Envoy III replaced the Rapide. The King's Flight Envoy had seats for four passengers plus a pilot, wireless operator, and steward. When Nevil Shute Norway of Airspeed queried the need for a steward on flights of up to two or three hours, he was told by the Captain of the Flight, Wing Commander Fielden "of the fatigue that royal personages must endure...of radiant people who had opened a Town Hall and shaken a thousand hands...collapsing in a coma of fatigue directly the door was shut, grey faced and utterly exhausted".

The outbreak of World War II in 1939 led to the replacement of the Envoy III with an armed Lockheed Hudson. A de Havilland Flamingo was added to The King's Flight in September 1940.

In 1942, The King's Flight was disbanded and its responsibilities transferred to No. 161 Squadron RAF, an operational military squadron, involved in the dropping of supplies and agents into occupied Europe throughout the War. The King's Flight was reformed on 1 May 1946 at RAF Benson with a single aircraft, a de Havilland Dominie and, soon after, with four Vickers Viking C.2.

As the Queen's Flight from 1952, the unit operated a variety of aircraft for the transport and pilot training of members of the royal family, including Vickers Viking, Avro York, de Havilland Heron and Devon, Westland Whirlwind, Westland Wessex HCC.4, Douglas Dakota (for the Royal Visit to Nepal in 1960), de Havilland Canada DHC-1 Chipmunk, Beagle Basset, and Hawker Siddeley Andover aircraft.

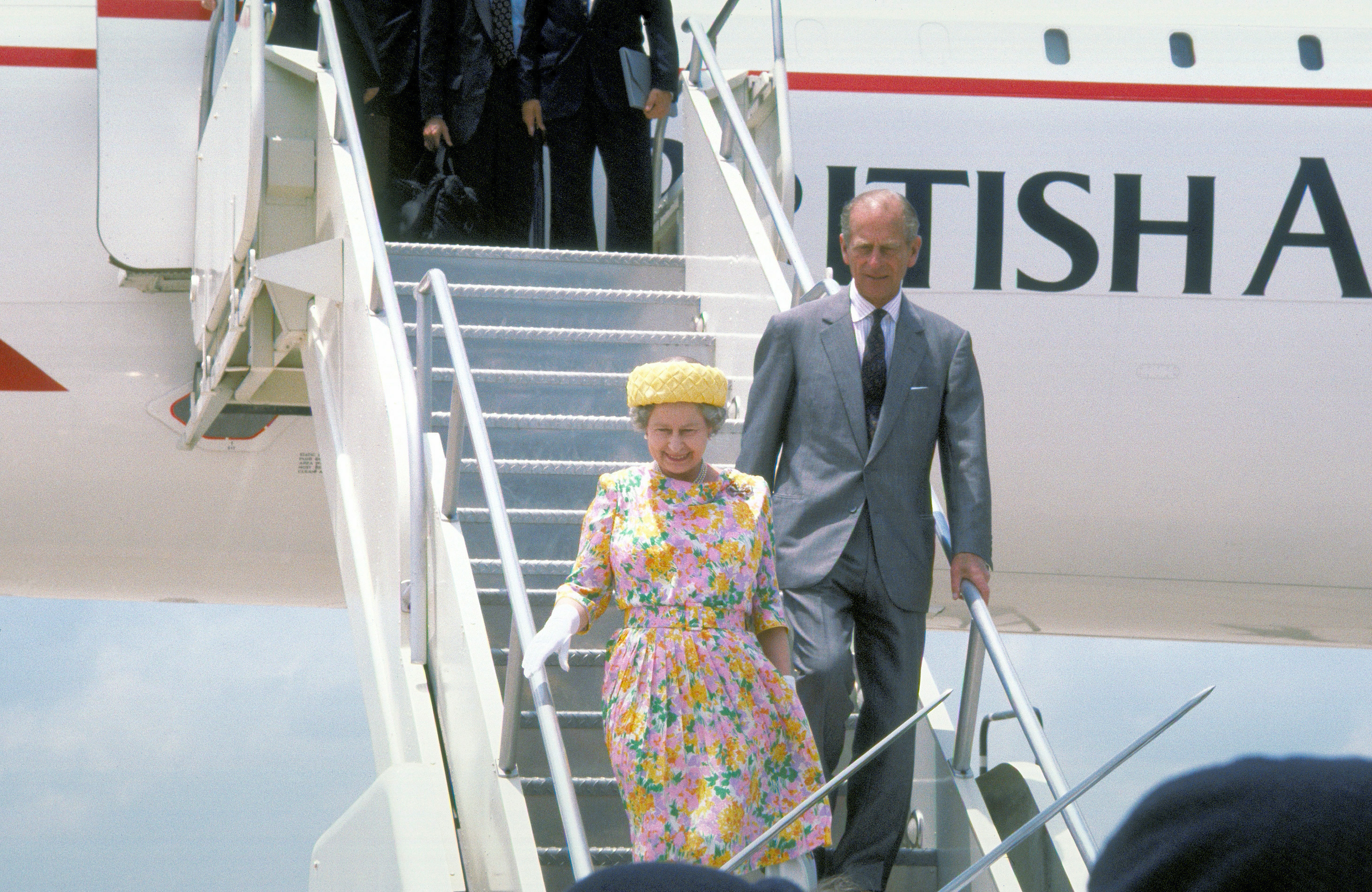
Queen Elizabeth II and Prince Philip disembark from a British Airways Concorde at Bergstrom Air Force Base near Austin, Texas, on their state visit to the United States in 1991.

On 2 November 1977, Queen Elizabeth II travelled for the first time aboard Concorde (aircraft G-BOAE). She then flew from the Grantley Adams International Airport, Barbados, to London Heathrow, England. That occasion was also the first visit by a Concorde aircraft to Barbados.

In 1983, the Royal Air Force leased two BAe 146 aircraft to assess their suitability as replacements for The Queen's Flight's Andovers. The trial was a success, and three VIP-configured BAe 146-100s entered service with The Queen's Flight (as BAe 146 CC.2s) from 1986 as the flight's first jet aircraft. In 2002, one of these BAe 146s was sold as surplus. These jets, also known as the BAe 146 Statesman, had a specially designed Royal Suite cabin. Although the civilian BAe 146-100 has 70-94 seats, the two BAe 146 CC.2 are configured for 19 or 26 passengers in comfort.

==== The Royal Squadron ====
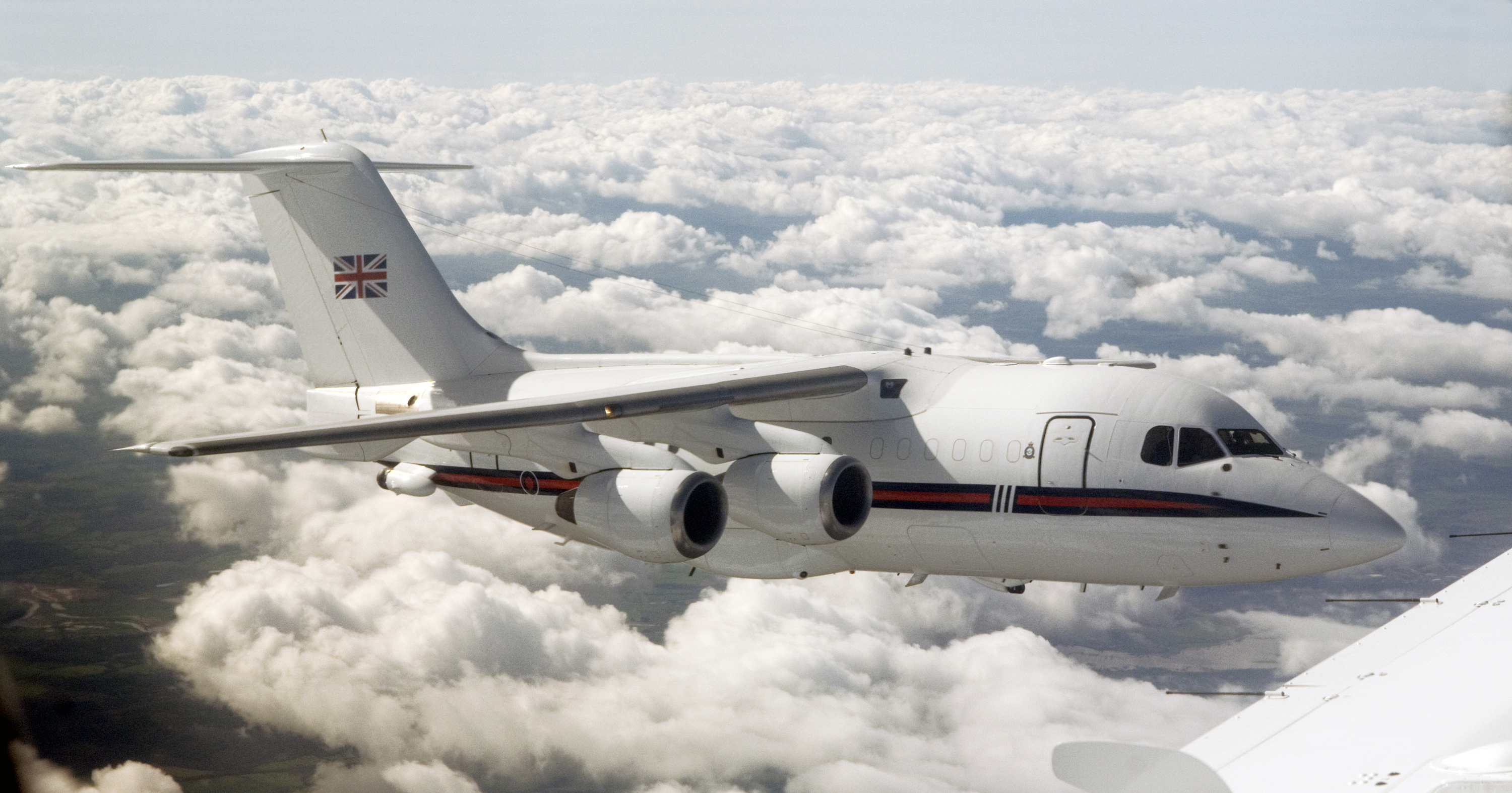
RAF BAe 146 CC2 aircraft, delivered to The Queen's Flight in 1986 and later part of 32 (The Royal) Squadron.

On 1 April 1995, The Queen's Flight was merged into No. 32 Squadron RAF to become No. 32 (The Royal) Squadron. Its BAe 146s and two Westland Wessex HCC.4 helicopters moved from RAF Benson to 32 Squadron's base at RAF Northolt.

The responsibility for the royal family's travel was transferred to the Royal Household on 1 April 1997. Before then, it was shared by the Ministry of Defence, the Department of Transport, and the Foreign and Commonwealth Office. The funding comes in the form of a royal travel grant-in-aid provided by the Department for Transport. Later in 1997, the Royal Yacht Britannia was retired and not replaced, and the Royal Household was given authorisation to acquire a helicopter for its private use.

The Royal Helicopter and the Royal Train are insufficient to meet all the travel requirements of the Royal Family, even for domestic travel. The King does not travel on scheduled flights, but other members of the Royal Family do so whenever possible. Members of the Royal Family are normally flown on private charters, either large fixed-wing aircraft, small fixed-wing aircraft, or helicopters, depending on the distance and the size of the official party.

The squadron merger ended the RAF's provision of dedicated VIP transport aircraft; the aircraft of 32 Squadron are only available to VIP passengers if not needed for military operations. This was declared officially in 1999. This policy reduced the charge per hour to the royal travel grant-in-aid for flying in an RAF jet radically.

==== BAe 146 ====
Operated for The Queen's Flight since 1986, two of these aircraft remained available to No. 32 Squadron as short-haul VIP configured airliners.

It was announced in the Strategic Defence and Security Review 2015 that Command Support Air Transport fleet aircraft would be replaced as they reached the end of their life to increase their operational utility and ensure continued effective transport for the royal family and senior ministers.

In February 2022, Defence Equipment and Support announced that the four BAe 146 aircraft would be replaced by two Dassault Falcon 900LX aircraft.

Both BAe 146 aircraft were withdrawn from service in March 2022 and were replaced by two Dassault 900LX aircraft, known as Envoy IV CC Mk1.

==== Other aircraft ====
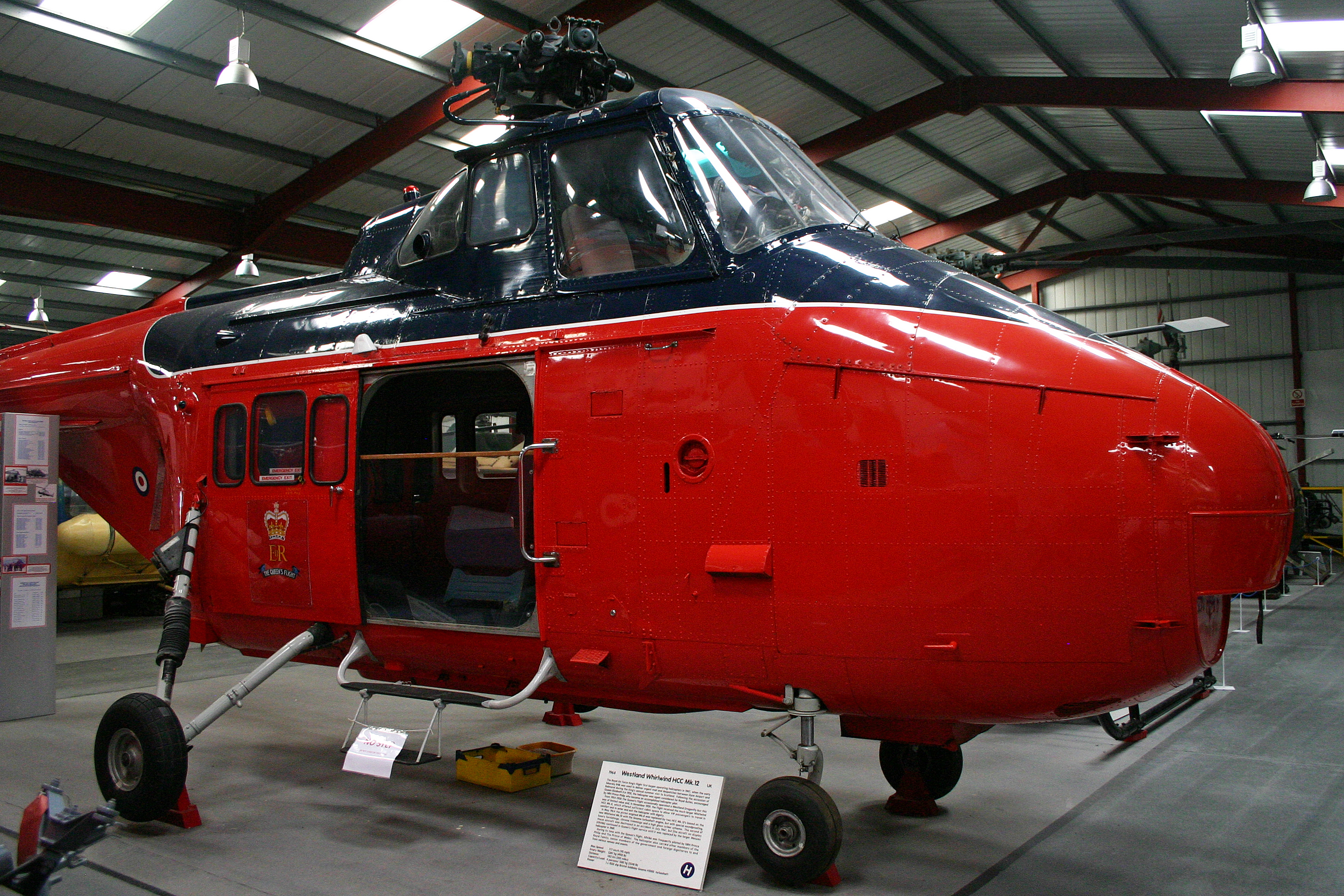
Retired Whirlwind helicopter of the Royal Flight

Other RAF aircraft have transported members of the royal family and ministers, particularly for long-range trips for which The King's Flight and Royal Squadron planes were unsuitable. This most often involved Vickers VC10 C.1s, XR807 and XV106, of No. 10 Squadron, later subsumed by No. 101 Squadron based at RAF Brize Norton.

Occasionally, the British Airways supersonic Concorde was used to transport the prime minister and royal family, particularly to international conferences abroad. Queen Elizabeth II's first supersonic flight was on 2 November 1977 at the end of her silver jubilee.

== Current aircraft ==
Most air travel by cabinet and junior ministers is on scheduled commercial flights. Travel on 32 Squadron aircraft is recommended where it is more cost-effective than using commercial air transport, or where security considerations dictate that special flights should be used. In 2016, the RAF VIP Voyager became the first dedicated VIP transport plane for government ministers and the Royal Family, after such plans had been proposed and shelved repeatedly since the 1990s.

The majority of non-scheduled travel for the Royal Family is provided by private charter, with Luxaviation UK being the exclusive supplier of private charters to the Royal Family since April 2009.

=== Principal VIP aircraft ===
==== Airbus Voyager ====
Historically, only the royal family had dedicated aircraft; government ministers flew on commercial flights, rented private jets, or occasionally RAF-operated flights. Proposals to provide a new dedicated VIP transport aircraft, for governmental or royal use, were first mooted in 1998. However, in March 2009 a proposal for a £7 million 12-seater private jet plans were halted by recession. In November 2015, it was announced the government would fit VIP seating to one of the nine core fleet of RAF Airbus Voyager tanker / transport aircraft for the use of senior government officials and members of the royal family. The Voyager refit cost £10 million, and the government estimated the use of the aircraft would save £775,000 a year versus the cost of charter flights; the new arrangement was expected to cost around £2,000 per flying hour as opposed to £6,700 for long-haul charter. The refit included a secure satellite communications system, missile detection, conference facilities, a changing room, 58 business class seats and 100 economy seats.

The aircraft, the RAF VIP Voyager, retained the standard Royal Air Force grey livery and continued its primary military duties when not in use by the government. Its first use as a VIP transport was on 8 July 2016, when it was used to take government ministers from London Heathrow airport to the 2016 NATO conference in Warsaw, Poland.

In 2018 foreign secretary Boris Johnson criticised the arrangements, protesting that the Voyager "never seems to be available". He also remarked that the aircraft's "drab grey colours undermined Britain's reputation when the country needed a powerful 'flagship'" and suggested that provision of a dedicated government aircraft would be desirable '"if there's a way of doing it that is not exorbitantly expensive". In June 2020, the aircraft was repainted in white with gold lettering with the Union Jack on its tail fin at a cost of £900,000.

As of July 2025 the Voyager has not been used for VIP taskings since November 2023, with the Airbus A321 used more regularly by the government.

=== Others ===
==== Dassault 900LX ====
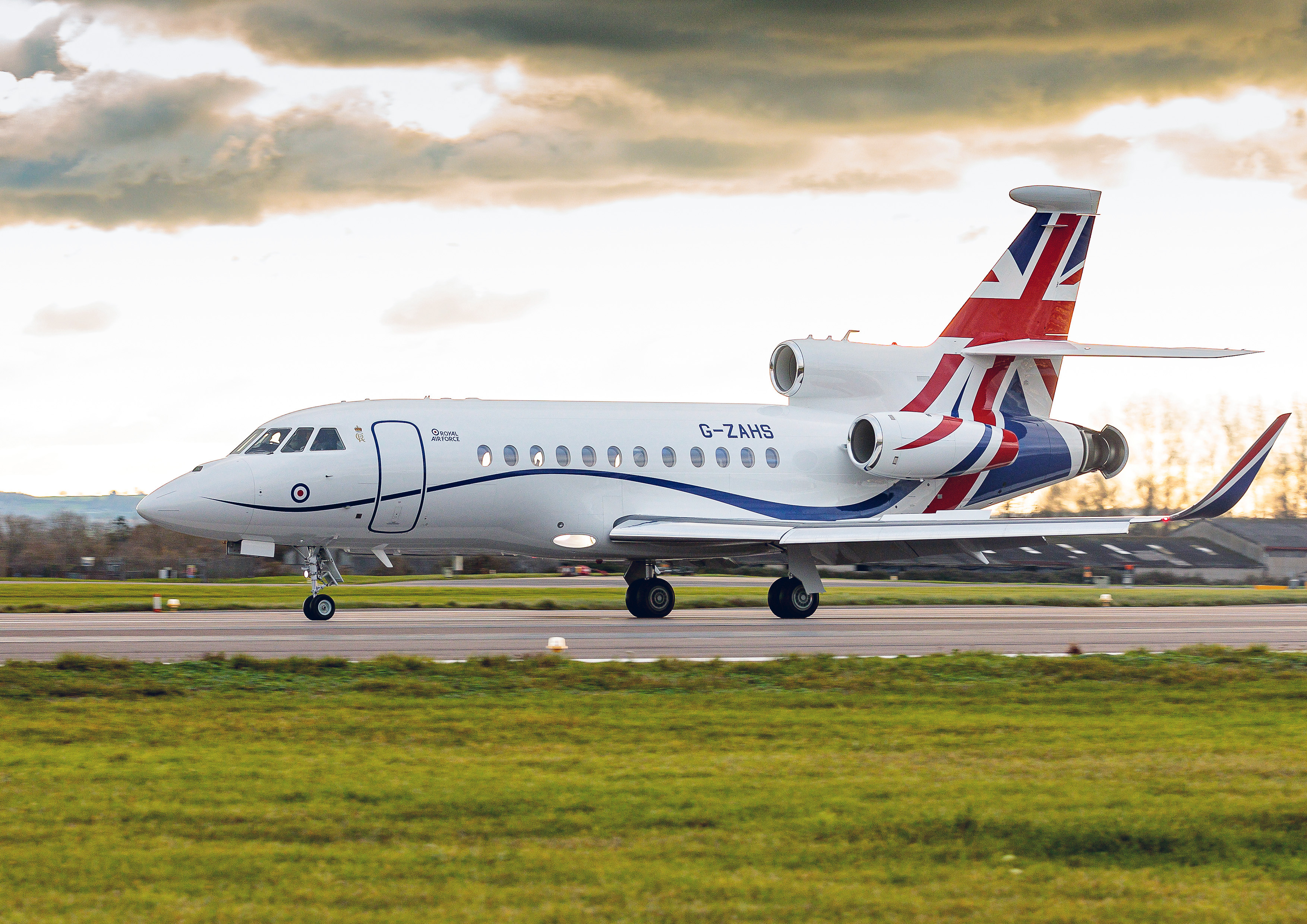
No. 32 Squadron RAF Dassault Envoy IV CC1.

In February 2022, Defence Equipment and Support announced that No. 32 Squadron would acquire two Dassault 900LX aircraft. The first of these jets was delivered to RAF Northolt in May 2022. The RAF named the new aircraft type Envoy IV.

Both aircraft were used to take Prime Minister Boris Johnson and Liz Truss to Aberdeen Airport on 6 September 2022 as part of their journeys to meet the Queen at Balmoral Castle for Johnson to resign as and Truss to become prime minister.

==== Airbus A321LR ====
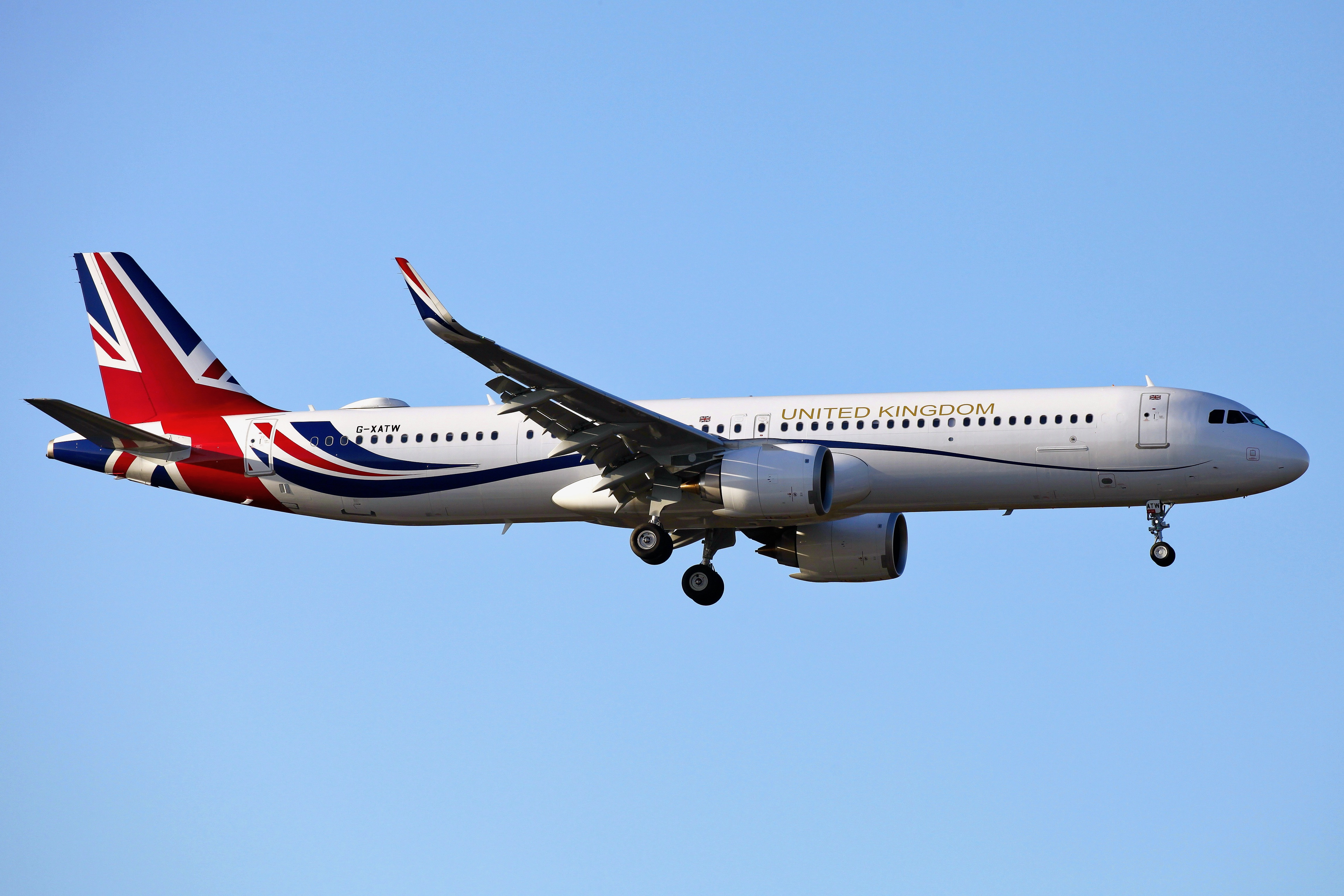
Titan Airways Airbus A321neo registered G-XATW.

In November 2020, the Cabinet Office signed a contract with Corporate Travel Management (North) Ltd for the exclusive lease of a VIP configured aircraft for the use of the prime minister, other ministers and VIPs. The contract was initially for two years (extendable to five years) with a potential total value of £75 million. The Cabinet Office had called for an aircraft with at least 30 and preferably 50 fully 'lie-flat' seats, meeting areas, high-speed Internet connection, and secure weapons storage. The aircraft was required be available within 12 hours' notice, be capable of carrying 30–50 passengers with 55 kilograms (121 pounds) of luggage each, at least from London to Washington–a distance of 4,500 nautical miles (8,300 km; 5,200 mi) in all weathers, and be available at all times while flying 50 hours per month. A 'key' aspect was that the aircraft be painted in the same Global Britain livery as the VIP Voyager. The travel management company sub-contracted Titan Airways to provide the actual service and an Airbus A321LR (A321-253NX) registered G-XATW entered service in early 2021. In April 2022 this aircraft was replaced with an identical A321neo, registered G-GBNI, which operated on the same basis. In November 2023 a new A321neo was introduced to replace the latter aircraft, with the G-GBNI registration and livery being transferred to the new airframe (previously G-POWT) and the original G-GBNI becoming G-OATW. The new airframe has an upgraded cabin.

=== The King's Helicopter Flight ===
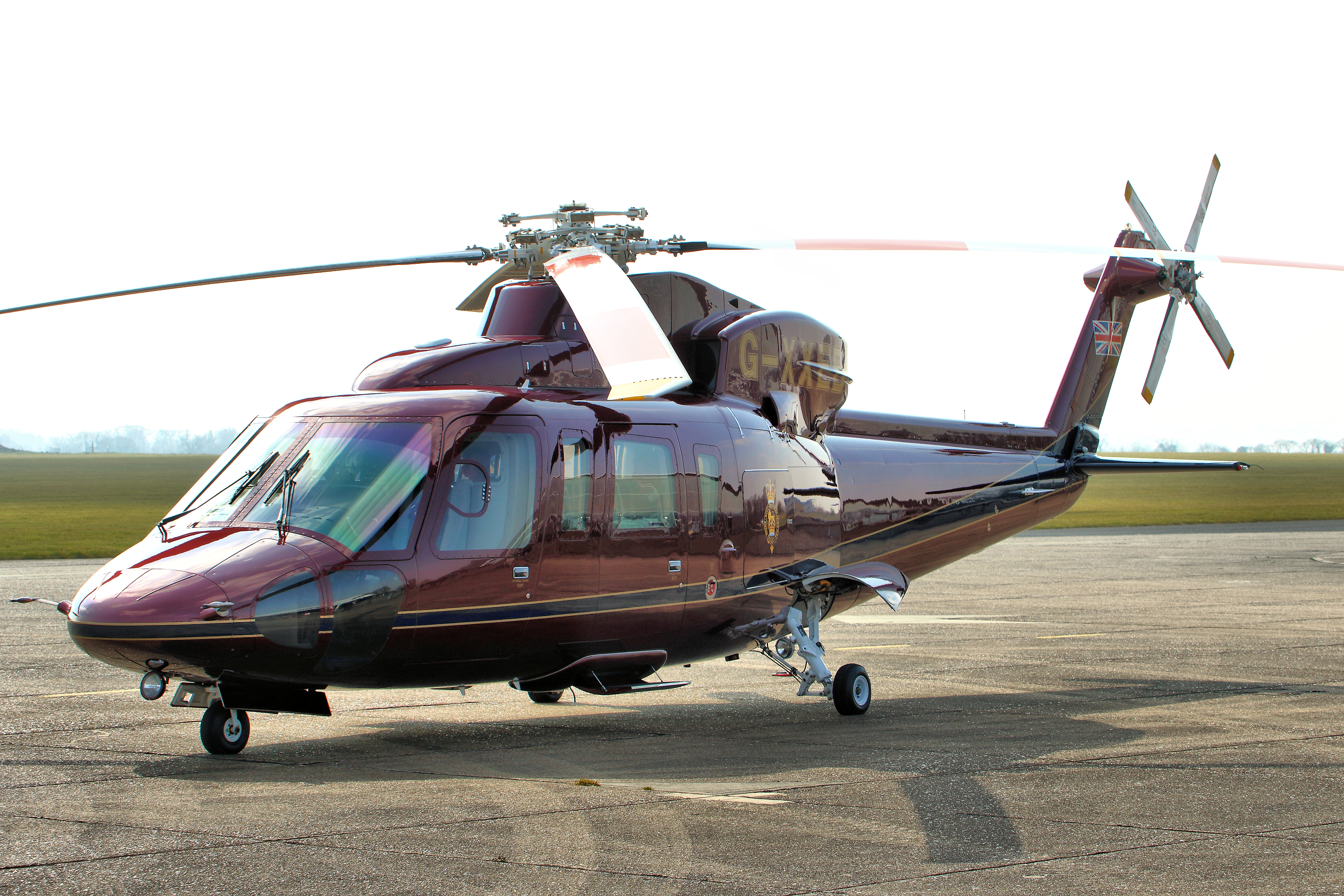
Sikorsky S-76C G-XXEB at Duxford in 2016

The King's Helicopter Flight (TKHF) is a dedicated helicopter transport service for the British monarch and royal family that provides air transport within the UK. It is part of the King's Private Secretary's Department of the Royal Household, and is tasked by the Royal Travel Office at Buckingham Palace. As of 2024, it is based at RAF Odiham and operated two Sikorsky S-76C++ helicopters, with the registrations G-XXEB and G-XXED.

The Queen's Helicopter Flight (TQHF) was created in 1998. From 1998 to 2009, it used a single maroon Sikorsky S-76C+ twin-engine helicopter, registered G-XXEA in honour of G-AEXX, the Airspeed Envoy that flew in the King's Flight. The helicopter, the first airframe dedicated solely to royal use, entered service on 21 December 1998. The S-76 is a commercial type widely used around the world, although the Kings's helicopter is fitted with only six seats for more comfort.

On 4 November 2009, Sikorsky announced the delivery of a new S-76C++ helicopter to TQHF, with the registration G-XXEB. An AgustaWestland AW109S, registration G-XXEC, was operated on long-term lease to TQHF from 2014 to 2019. TQHF took ownership of a second Sikorsky S-76C, G-XXED, in 2019.

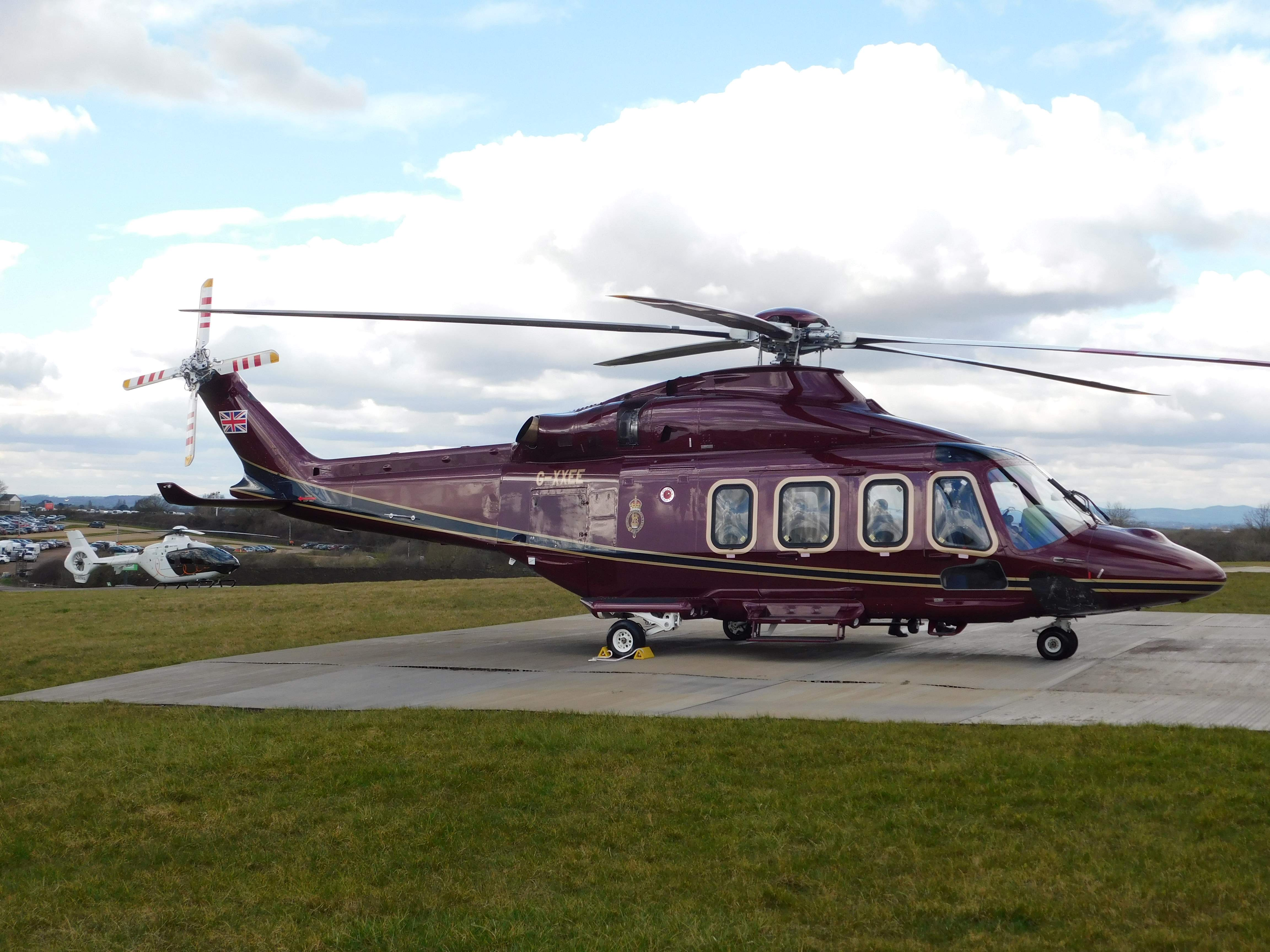
Leonardo AW139 helicopter G-XXEE of The King's Flight, at Cheltenham in March 2025

TQHF was renamed to TKHF after the death of Elizabeth II in September 2022. In July 2024, it was reported that TKHF would replace its existing S-76 helicopters with two new AgustaWestland AW139 aircraft in the financial year 2024-2025, after the point was discussed in the annual report released by the Sovereign Grant. The report also revealed that the annual cost of helicopter travel for the royal family was £2,000,000, a year-on-year increase of £200,000.

== Fleet overview ==
=== Current fleet ===
As of April 2025:

Aircraft	Qty.	Year introduced	Operator	Role	Registration(s)
AgustaWestland AW139	2	2025	The King's Helicopter Flight (TKHF)	For Royal Family use replacing Sikorsky S-76C++.	G-XXEE; G-XXEF
Dassault Falcon 900LX (Envoy IV CC Mk1)	2	2022	No. 32 Squadron RAF and Centreline AV Ltd	Transport for government ministers, military & diplomatic personnel and members of the Royal Family.	G-ZAHS; G-ZABH
Airbus A330 MRTT	1	2016	No. 10 Squadron RAF	International transport for government ministers and members of the Royal Family.	ZZ336
Airbus A321LR	1	2021	Titan Airways	Transporting government ministers and members of the Royal Family.	G-GBNI

=== Historical fleet ===
Aircraft	Qty.	Date introduced	Date retired	Notes
Westland Wapiti	2	1928	1933	
de Havilland Dragon Rapide	1	1936	1937	
Airspeed AS.6J Envoy III	1	1937	1939	
Lockheed Hudson	1	1939	1942	
de Havilland Flamingo	1	1940	1942	
de Havilland Dominie	1	1946	unknown	
Vickers VC.1 Viking	4	1946	unknown	
de Havilland Heron	4	1955	1964	
Hawker Siddeley Andover CC.2	3	1964	1986 & 1991	
British Aerospace 125	6	1982	2015	
British Aerospace 146 CC.2	3	1983	2022	
Westland Wessex HCC.4	2	1969	1998	
Sikorsky S-76C+	1	1998	2009	
Sikorsky S-76C++	2	2009	2025	
AgustaWestland AW109E	4	2006	2019	
AgustaWestland AW109SP	1	2016	2024	

== Cost of royal travel ==
The cost of royal travel (not including cars) is dominated by royal air travel, but also includes trains and yacht charter. All costs for the previous financial year ending 31 March are documented every year in an Appendix to the Sovereign Grant Report detailing the expenses. Only travel by the King, Queen, and Prince and Princess of Wales from residence to residence is considered official and funded by the Sovereign Grant. The report does not show individual flights but overall trip budgets, which may include pre-trip reconnaissance and other associated costs. Only trips in excess of £17,000 are detailed with trips under that amount being presented as a block total. The 2024 Sovereign Grant Report for the financial year 2023-24 showed expenditure of £4.2million on travel. This was broken down further showing £2 million was spent on helicopters, £1.1 million on charter flights, £300,000 on scheduled flights, £600,000 on the train travel and £200,000 on motorcars. Also revealed in the Sovereign Grant Report was the commitment of £39.9 million for two new helicopter leases to replace the existing Kings Helicopter Flight helicopters.

Cost of royal air travel (in £millions; year ends 31 March)
	2023/24	2014	2013	2012	2011	2010	2009	2008	2007	2006	2005	2004	2003
Fixed-wing (civil charter + scheduled flights)	unknown	2.2	1.4	2.2	2.2	1.6	2.6	2.2	1.9	1.6	1.2	0.8	0.4
Fixed-wing (Royal Air Force)	unknown	unknown	0.1	0.022	0.2	0.4	0.4	0.4	0.8	0.7	0.5	0.5	
Helicopters (includes fixed costs of helicopter lease and staff of 9 of TKHF), £1.6M fixed costs for TKHF	2.0	1.5	1.6	2.4	2.4	2.1	2.3	2.2	2.2	2.2	2.1	2.3	2.1

=== Criticism of royal air travel ===
Some criticism was aimed at expensive charters that were employed for visits of Charles, Prince of Wales, for trips that some believe were not critical to his role as British heir apparent. Two of the most expensive charters were for visits to South America in March 2009 (£660,594) for a tour related to the Prince's ecological concerns, and a trip to Japan and Indonesia in October and November 2008 that cost £665,674.

Between 12 and 16 June 2010, Charles and his wife the Duchess of Cornwall took a four-day short break to their home in Balmoral, Scotland. The charge to the government was £29,786 for a jet to fly them to Aberdeen and to return to London.

Prince Charles's choice of chartering an Airbus A319 that seats 29 people for a tour in 2009 to raise environmental awareness was criticised for its carbon footprint.

== See also ==
- Air transports of heads of state and government
- British Royal Train
- Commando (aircraft)
- List of royal yachts of the United Kingdom
- Royal barge of the United Kingdom
- State and royal cars of the United Kingdom
