= De Havilland Flamingo =

British passenger and transport aircraft

DH.95 Flamingo
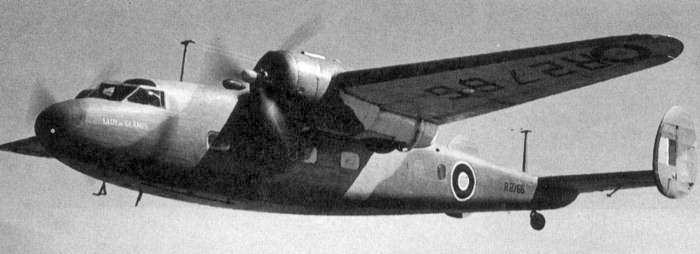
- Lady of Glamis the former King's Flight Flamingo circa 1943

General information
- Type: Airliner; Communications aircraft
- Manufacturer: de Havilland
- Designer: Ronald Eric Bishop
- Primary users: Royal Air Force BOAC
- Number built: 14

History
- Introduction date: 15 July 1939
- First flight: 22 December 1938
- Retired: 1950

The de Havilland DH.95 Flamingo was a British twin-engined high-wing monoplane airliner first flown on 22 December 1938. During the Second World War some were used by the Royal Air Force (RAF) as a transport and general communications duties.

== Design and development ==
The Flamingo was a twin-engined civil airliner developed by de Havilland, led by their newly appointed chief designer R. E. Bishop, and was the first all-metal stressed-skin aircraft built by the company; only the control surfaces were fabric covered. It was powered by two 890 hp Bristol Perseus air-cooled sleeve-valve radial engines driving three-bladed de Havilland Propellers 'Hydromatic' variable-pitch propellers. Two pilots were seated side by side with a radio operator behind them in the cockpit, with the cabin accommodating 12–17 passengers depending on the flight distance. It had a retractable undercarriage, slotted flaps, and was considered a highly promising sales prospect for the company, capable of competing with the American Douglas DC-3 and Lockheed Model 10 Electra. The first prototype flew on 22 December 1938. A third central fin was fitted during initial flight tests as a temporary measure; this was removed when larger fins with larger rudder area were fitted to the twin tail.

Powered by 890 hp (660 kW) Bristol Perseus XIIIC engines, it had a maximum weight takeoff in 750 ft (230 m) and the ability to maintain height or climb at 120 mph (190 km/h) on a single engine.

Testing was successful, with the Flamingo being granted a certificate of airworthiness on 30 June 1939, with an initial production run of twenty aircraft being laid down. The Air Ministry were interested in the Flamingo as a military transport and issued a serial T5357 for official evaluation.

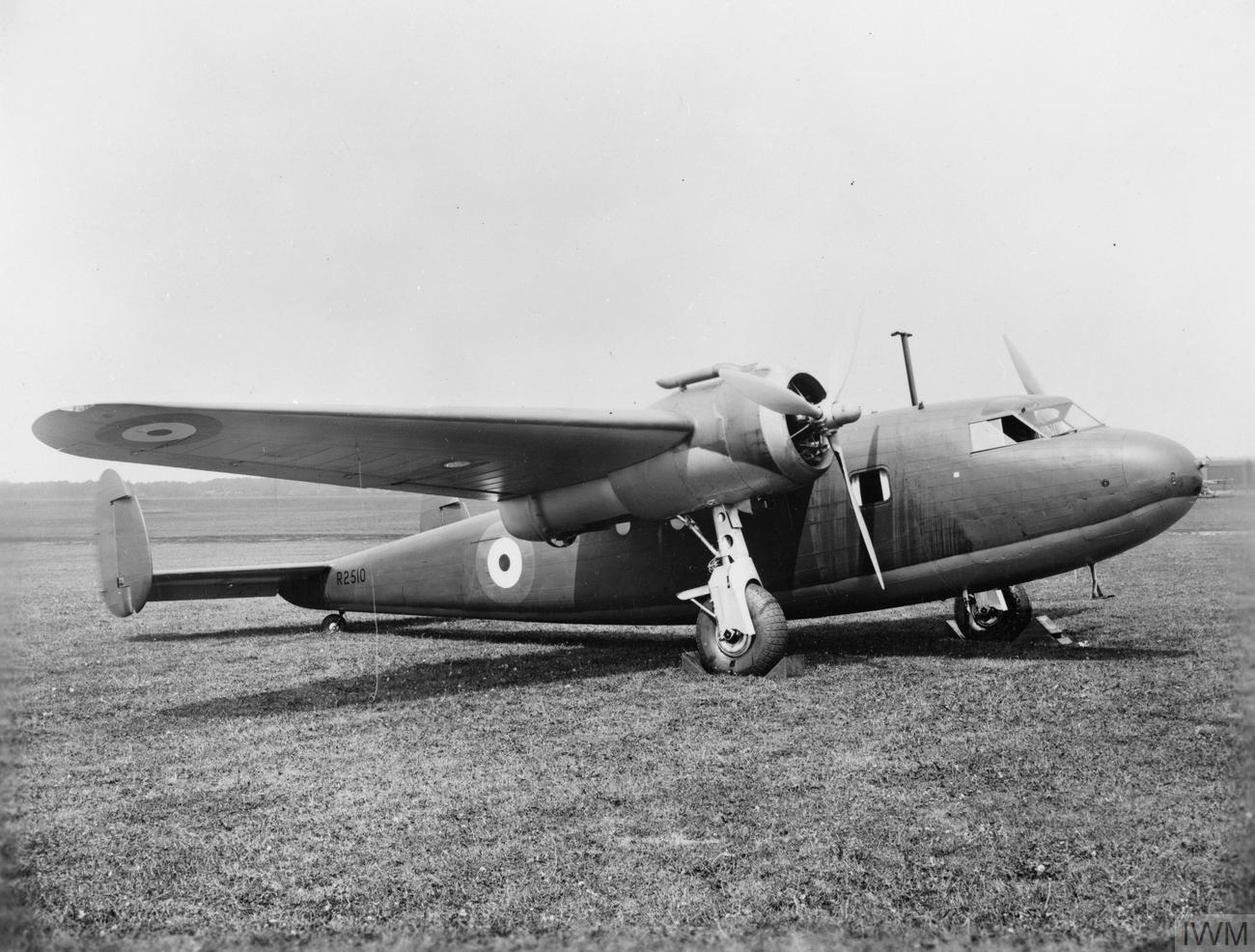
R2510, the only DH.95 Hertfordshire

A single military transport variant was built to Specification 19/39 as the DH.95 Hertfordshire. It had small circular cabin windows instead of the rectangular ones, and seating for 22 soldiers. A proposed order for 30 was cancelled to leave de Havilland free to produce Tiger Moth trainers. The sole Hertfordshire (R2510) crashed on 23 October 1940 at Mill Hill killing five crew and six passengers, including Air Vice-marshal Charles Blount, the Air Officer Commanding No. 22 Group RAF travelling from Hendon to Northern Ireland, apparently due to jamming of the elevator.

== Operational service ==
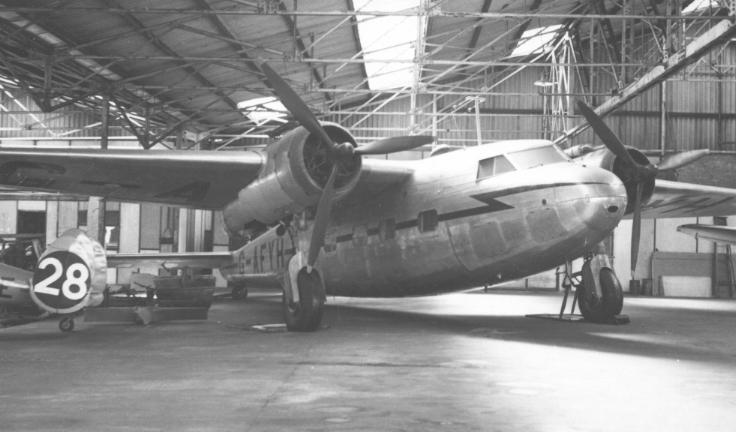
DH.95 Flamingo G-AFYH of British Air Transport at Redhill airfield, Surrey, in June 1953

Following the success of the first test flights Jersey Airways ordered three 17-seat aircraft, and this was followed by orders from the Egyptian government and the Air Ministry. The Air Ministry aircraft were to be used by the Air Council and the King's Flight.

The prototype, fitted with 12 passenger seats, was delivered to Jersey Airways in May 1939 for two months evaluation and became the first revenue-earning Flamingo. The first services carried mail only but in July a regular weekend passenger service was operated.

In October 1939 the prototype was bought by the Air Council, being delivered to No. 24 Squadron RAF where it operated until it was lost in an accident in October 1940. The second aircraft was to be the first for Guernsey and Jersey Airlines but it was impressed into military service and delivered to 24 Squadron, the other two on order were never built due to the outbreak of the Second World War.

Two Flamingos R2764 and R2565 built to Specification 21/39 for the RAF were sent to the Kings Flight at RAF Benson. Flamingo R2766 (built to Specification 20/39) with 24 Squadron joined them in The King's Flight (with civilian serial G-AGCC) during the invasion scare period in June to be used in the event of the royal family having to leave the country but passed back to 24 Squadron for communications and liaison duties in early 1941 becoming R2766 again and given the additional name 'Lady of Glamis' in 1942. G-AGAZ, a test bed for Perseus Mk XVI engines became AE444 with 24 Squadron and named 'Lady of Ayr'.

Early in 1940 BOAC ordered eight aircraft to be powered by the Perseus XVI and originally intended as ten-seaters. The first BOAC aircraft was delivered to Whitchurch on 5 September 1940. The second BOAC aircraft was impressed by the Air Ministry and allocated for Admiralty use at RNAS Donibristle. To replace the impressed aircraft BOAC were later allotted the aircraft ordered by the Egyptian Government. After a period of training all the BOAC Flamingos were moved to Cairo to operate in the Middle East. The BOAC aircraft were named after English kings (Arthur, Alfred, Harold, Henry, Richard, James, Charles, William) and were named K-class by the airline.

The Flamingo was Winston Churchill's favourite short/medium range transport and he flew it to visit Reynaud and the French leadership as the Western front collapsed on May 16, 1940.

The BOAC Flamingoes were not popular, and following three accidents (Note: King Henry at Adana, Turkey September 1942, King Harold at Addis Ababa, Ethiopia November 1942, and King Arthur at Asmara, Eritrea February 1943) – one of which was fatal – and with a lack of spares, the airline decided to withdraw the type. In 1943 the four airworthy aircraft were shipped back to the United Kingdom and stored at Croydon. They did not return to service and were scrapped at Redhill in the early 1950s.

Most of the RAF aircraft were withdrawn from use during the war and were slowly scrapped to provide spares for the remaining aircraft. The Admiralty aircraft (BT312 ‘Merlin VI') was due to be withdrawn and scrapped but in August 1944 it ground looped at Gatwick and was abandoned. In 1946 the former Admiralty aircraft was bought by Southern Aircraft (Gatwick) and rebuilt using former BOAC spare parts. It flew again in 1947 and was delivered to British Air Transport at Redhill, gaining a Certificate of Airworthiness. It operated a number of charter flight until it was temporarily withdrawn from use in 1949 before being scrapped in 1954.

British Air Transport also arranged to restore three former BOAC aircraft, but the scheme was abandoned despite the aircraft being in an advanced stage of reconstruction. In 1952, British Air Transport restored the original former Admiralty aircraft, which flew again on 27 May 1952. Redhill Aerodrome was closed in 1954 and the last flying Flamingo was dismantled and scrapped. A short clip of a Flamingo appears in the film Mistaken Identity.

== Operators ==
=== Military operators ===
United Kingdom

- Royal Air Force
  - No. 24 Squadron RAF
  - King's Flight
- Fleet Air Arm
  - 782 Naval Air Squadron

=== Civilian operators ===
United Kingdom

- BOAC
- British Air Transport
- Jersey Airways

== Specifications ==
Data from De Havilland Aircraft since 1909

General characteristics

- Crew: 3 (two pilots, radio operator)
- Capacity: 17 passengers maximum
- Length: 51 ft 7 in (15.72 m)
- Wingspan: 70 ft 0 in (21.34 m)
- Height: 15 ft 3 in (4.65 m)
- Wing area: 651 sq ft (60.5 m^{2})
- Empty weight: 11,325 lb (5,137 kg)
- Gross weight: 18,000 lb (8,165 kg)
- Powerplant: 2 × Bristol Perseus XVI 9-cylinder air-cooled radial piston engines, 930 hp (690 kW) each
- Propellers: 3-bladed variable-pitch propellers

Performance

- Maximum speed: 243 mph (391 km/h, 211 kn)
- Cruise speed: 204 mph (328 km/h, 177 kn)
- Range: 1,345 mi (2,165 km, 1,169 nmi)
- Service ceiling: 20,900 ft (6,400 m)
- Rate of climb: 1,470 ft/min (7.5 m/s) initial

Avionics

- Sperry Automatic Pilot

== See also ==
Aircraft of comparable role, configuration, and era

- Douglas DC-5

Related lists

- List of aircraft of the Royal Air Force

== Sources ==
- Bain, Gordon. De Havilland: A Pictorial Tribute. London: AirLife, 1992. ISBN 1-85648-243-X.
- Green, William and Gordon Swanborough. "De Havilland's War Orphan." Air Enthusiast. Number 30, March–June 1986, pp. 1–10. Bromley, Kent, UK: Pilot Press.
- Jackson, A.J. De Havilland Aircraft since 1909. London: Putnam, Third edition 1987. ISBN 0-85177-802-X.
- The Birth of an Airliner, Picture Post, 15 July 1939 pages 43–48
