= Luxury Briefing =

Luxury Briefing is a magazine that was launched in 1996 by James Ogilvy. The magazine is published by the Luxury Business Group on a monthly basis and is based in London. It is a subscription-only publication and focuses on luxury goods, such as cars and clothes. The magazine confers an Award for Excellence each year.

In 2011 the magazine started a quarterly supplement, Luxury Connections.

== Award for Excellence ==
- 2005 Aston Martin
- 2003 Bentley Motors
- 1998 Tanne Krolle
