= British Air Transport =

British independent airline

British Air Transport Ltd (BAT) was a British independent airline from 1932 until 1951.

== History ==
=== Prewar operations ===
BAT was formed during 1932 to perform public charter flights. BAT based its aircraft fleet at Croydon Airport south of London. It was one of the first UK airlines to operate the four-passenger de Havilland Fox Moth single-engined light airliner. BAT's commercial operations ceased at the outbreak of World War II.

=== Postwar operations ===
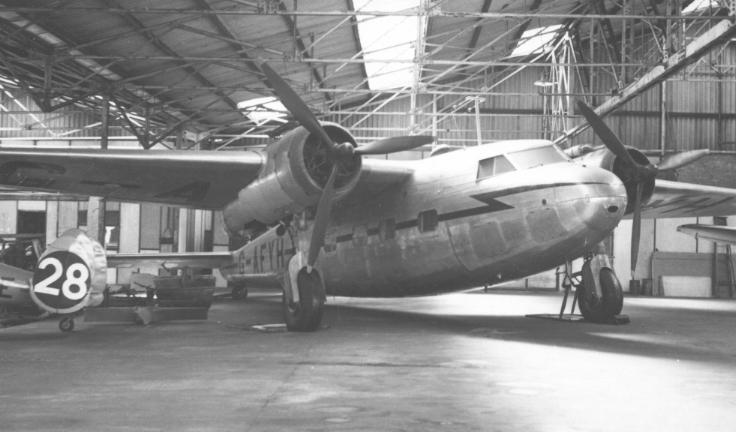
DH.95 de Havilland Flamingo at Redhill airfield, Surrey, in June 1953

BAT resumed air charter operations from RAF Kenley in Surrey in May 1946 equipped with two Auster Autocrats and one Airspeed Consul. The Austers were used on pleasure flying and photography from both Kenley and Croydon. The eight-seat Consul was joined by four others and performed passenger and freight charters within the U.K. and to the near Continent.

BAT owned Redhill Aerodrome and as soon as the Royal Air Force moved out in 1947, the firm's charter and other operations were set up there. The sole remaining airworthy de Havilland Flamingo 17-passenger airliner G-AFYH was purchased by BAT in May 1947. It flew passenger charter flights from Croydon. During 1947–1948, BAT had a regular contract to fly newspapers from Croydon to Jersey and Guernsey and the airline bought six Avro Ansons for the flights, which were supplemented by the Flamingo when loads were heavy. In late 1948, the newspaper contracts were lost to a competitor and the airline operation was gradually run down, ceasing in 1951. The twin-engined aircraft were disposed of, and after storage, the Flamingo was scrapped in 1954, but BAT continued to own and operate the airfield at Redhill.

== Fleet ==
- 2 x Auster Autocrat
- 5 x Airspeed Consul
- 6 x Avro Anson
- de Havilland Fox Moth
- 1 x de Havilland Flamingo
- 2 x de Havilland Dove

== See also ==
- List of defunct airlines of the United Kingdom
