= Heatherdown School =

Former school in Berkshire, England

Coordinates: 51.4126°N 0.7033°W

Information
- School type: Preparatory school
- Closed: 1982
- Age: 7 to 13
- Enrollment: c.80-90

Heatherdown School, formally called Heatherdown Preparatory School, was an independent preparatory school for boys, near Ascot, in the English county of Berkshire. Set in 30 acres (12 ha) of grounds, it typically taught between eighty and ninety boys between the ages of seven and thirteen and closed in 1982.

The school was a leading "feeder school" for Eton College.

== Heatherlea ==
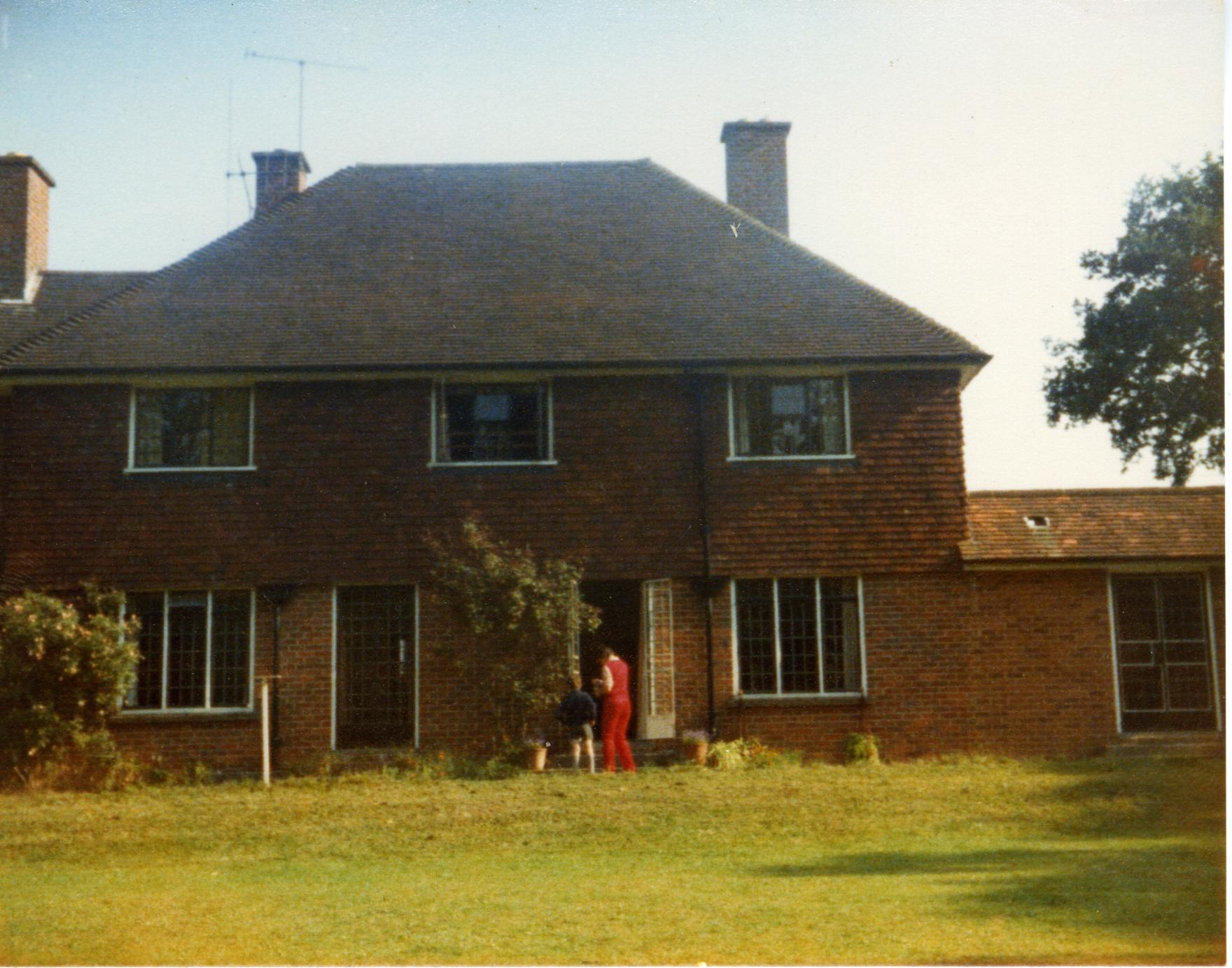
Heatherlea summer 1980. Dormitories were on the top floor and the ground floor extension behind the french doors.

During their first year at the school, boys attended classes in the main school building but at night returned to Heatherlea, a small house set back from the London Road near the Royal Foresters Hotel. Heatherlea typically had around eight boys and two matrons.

== Main school ==
After the first year boys moved to the main school building where dormitories were located on the first and second floors. Classrooms were located on the ground floor along with a concert hall and dining room. A common room was located above the concert hall. The school also had a chapel and library.

== Other buildings ==
In addition to the main school and Heatherlea there was also a carpentry shop, a model room, a gatehouse and air raid shelter.

== Grounds ==
The grounds were extensive and included a walled kitchen garden, playing fields, a lake with island, woodlands, gardens and gardening plots for boys.

== Sports ==
A wide range of sports were played at the school and in competition against schools such as Lambrook, Sunningdale, Woodcote, Stubbington House, Ludgrove, St George's and Scaitcliffe. Cricket, football, tennis, table tennis, judo, and rugby were played. The school also had a 0.22 calibre rifle range.

== Railway ==
The school had its own miniature steam railway that ran around a substantial area of the grounds. It was set up by Henry May, who ran a garage in Ascot. The railway was used by enthusiasts from outside the school, although boys were regularly recruited as passengers and spectators. The railway had one station, a halt, a tunnel and a turntable.

== Notable former pupils ==
The school's pupils included:

- Prince Edward, Duke of Edinburgh
- Andrew Russell, 15th Duke of Bedford
- Alexander Cameron, barrister
- David Cameron, former Prime Minister of the United Kingdom
- David Cholmondeley, 7th Marquess of Cholmondeley
- Alexander Cockburn, writer
- Sir Edward Fielden, pilot and Second World War hero
- Giles Goschen, 4th Viscount Goschen
- Bryan Guinness, 2nd Baron Moyne
- Victor Hely-Hutchinson
- George Mountbatten, 4th Marquess of Milford Haven
- Lord Ivar Mountbatten
- Andrew Mountbatten-Windsor
- David Niven, actor
- William Legge, 10th Earl of Dartmouth
- Angus Ogilvy
- James Ogilvy
- John Eric Drummond, 9th Earl of Perth
- Oliver Shepard
- David Carnegie, 4th Duke of Fife
- George Windsor, Earl of St Andrews
- King Jigme Singye Wangchuck, 4th King of Bhutan

According to Francis Elliot and James Hanning's biography of David Cameron, the school was renowned for its academic and sporting excellence.

== Closure ==
The last Headmaster of the School was James V. Edwards. After closing in 1982 for financial difficulty, the buildings were bought by the Licensed Victuallers, in order to set up a junior school. The buildings were eventually demolished in 1989 at which point the site was redeveloped to house both the LVS junior school and the senior school, which moved to Ascot from its previous location in Slough. All that remains of the original school is the lake.

== See also ==
- List of boys' schools in the United Kingdom
- Licensed Victuallers' School, now on the school site
