= Edward Fielden (RAF officer) =

English air vice-marshal (1903–1976)

Sir Edward Fielden GCVO CB DFC AFC
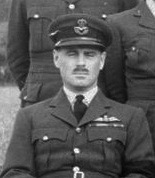
- Edward Fielden in 1942
- Born: 4 December 1903; Bracknell, England
- Died: 8 November 1976 (aged 72); Edinburgh, Scotland
- Military career
- Allegiance: United Kingdom
- Branch: Royal Air Force
- Service years: 1924–1968
- Rank: Air Vice-Marshal
- Nickname: "Mouse"
- Service number: 18166
- Commands: Queen's Flight (1947–62); RAF Tempsford (1942–45); No. 161 Squadron (1942)
- Conflicts: Second World War
- Awards: Knight Grand Cross of the Royal Victorian Order; Companion of the Order of the Bath; Distinguished Flying Cross; Air Force Cross; Mentioned in Despatches (2)

Air Vice-Marshal Sir Edward Hedley "Mouse" Fielden, GCVO, CB, DFC, AFC (4 December 1903 – 8 November 1976) was a senior Royal Air Force commander and a pilot of the Second World War.

== Early life ==
He was born in Bracknell, Berkshire, on 4 December 1903, the elder son of surgeon Edward Fielden, and his wife, Maud Jennie Armstrong. He was educated at Heatherdown School, Ascot, and Malvern College where he joined the Officers' Training Corps. He obtained a short service commission with the Royal Air Force in 1924, aged 21, flying with No. 25 and then No. 23 Squadron in 1925 and 1926. He was posted to the meteorological flight at Duxford in September 1926, where he flew the flight's Hawker Woodcock. After his five-year commission, in 1929, he was posted to the Reserve and awarded the Air Force Cross. He was promoted to the rank of flight lieutenant in November that year.

== Flying the royal family ==
Fielden figured largely in the flying activities of the Royal Family for more than three decades, and most important royal flights were subject to his scrutiny and recommendation. His discretion and self-effacement earned him the nickname of "Mouse". His association with the Royal Family began in 1929, when the then Prince of Wales (later to become King Edward VIII), who had acquired a Gipsy Moth, appointed Fielden as his personal pilot. Fielden's first major foreign assignment involved planning the Prince's trip to Buenos Aires in 1931 which involved shipping a Puss Moth aboard HMS Eagle and the rental of another whilst there for Prince George's use. In October 1933, the Prince appointed Flight Lieutenant Fielden as his Chief Air Pilot and Extra Equerry. With the death of King George V on 20 January 1936, Edward VIII succeeded to the throne, and on 21 July, Fielden was appointed Captain of the King's Flight. Edward's reign was short-lived, abdicating on 11 December 1936 and being succeeded by his brother George VI. Fielden was retained as Captain of the King's Flight and his role was expanded. He was charged with the carriage not only of members of the Royal Family, but also members of the Air Council and other important state personages.

== Second World War ==
Fielden had remained in the RAF Reserve and was promoted to wing commander in July 1936 and made a Member of the Royal Victorian Order in October. After the outbreak of the Second World War he returned to active service. In early 1942 he was chosen to be the commanding officer of the newly created No. 161 Squadron, assuming command 14 April 1942 when the unit was formed. The squadron was established with seven Lysanders hived off from the No. 138 Squadron 'C' Flight, along with five Whitleys and two Wellingtons, plus the Hudson donated from the King's Flight. The Lysanders were placed in the 161 Squadron 'A' flight which handled pick-ups and deliveries of agents. The 'B' flight consisted of the heavier two engine aircraft, and performed drops of agents and supplies, much as 138 Squadron did. The squadron shared the airbase at RAF Tempsford with 138 Squadron.

Arthur Harris was appointed the commanding officer of Bomber Command in February 1942. One of his primary efforts was to place as many resources as possible into the air to advance the bombing campaign. He strongly opposed dissipation of his forces. Regarding the support that England was providing to the resistance movements in occupied Europe, Harris believed these missions should be undertaken by regular bomber squadrons, and the aircraft, crews and resources of the special duties squadrons be distributed to main force bombing squadrons. In the summer of 1942 the special duties squadrons began participating in bombing missions during the 'no moon' periods when they were not running agents and supplies into Europe. On the night of 2/3 June 1942 Fielden led the first bombing raid conducted by 161 Squadron, leading five Whitleys to bomb Tours. The practice of using the SD squadrons for bombing missions was abandoned by the end of August, with no clear indication as to why.

In October 1942, Fielden was promoted to group captain and was made station commander of RAF Tempsford. Fielden played an important role in directing operations in support of the resistance movements in Europe, and continued to fly occasional operations. On the night of 26/27 November 1942 Fielden took the King's Flight Hudson on a pick-up mission to an unused French airfield. He arrived over the target but no reception lights were displayed. He circled for 30 minutes before turning back and landing at RAF Tangmere. In the late spring of 1943, Fielden again took the Hudson on a pick-up mission, this time to southern France for a pick-up of six passengers. Fog over the target airfield made it impossible for him to land. He repeated the effort four days later on 19 May and was successful. However, by the time they all had boarded he was running out of night. He knew if he returned to England he would be flying in broad daylight before he cleared the French coast. Not wanting to run the risk of being caught out by a Luftwaffe fighter patrol, he decided to head south. Reaching the southern coast he headed out over the Mediterranean, bound for North Africa. He reached the recently established British airfield in Algiers at Maison Blanche at six in the morning. There he was refueled, and the following day he headed west for Gibraltar. The party reached England safely the next day. This southern exit route out of France was used many times subsequently whenever a trip to the south of France was running tight for the return.

On 9 November 1943 the King and Queen arrived to visit RAF Tempsford. They were met by Fielden, who had been the pilot for King George when he had served as Captain of the King's Flight. Fielden greeted them and gave them a tour of the facility, and then served them tea in the officer's lounge. By 6:00 pm the royals ended their visit, and the normal duties of RAF Tempsford were resumed.

Promoted to group captain in January 1943, he was awarded a Distinguished Flying Cross in April 1943. In June that same year, his services to the Royal Family were recognised by his appointment as a Commander of the Royal Victorian Order. A few days after Christmas, 1944, Fielden was promoted to Air commodore and transferred to become station commander at RAF Woodhall Spa, a 5 Group station and home to the 617 (Dambusters) Squadron and 627 Squadron, another Mosquito outfit. He remained the commanding officer of this station until the end of the war.

== Post-war career ==
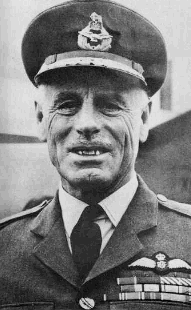
"Mouse" Fielden at the time of his retirement from the RAF

After the war, on 1 March 1946, Fielden was reconfirmed in his former role as an Extra Equerry of the King. In May 1946, the King's Flight was reformed with Fielden once again its captain. Following the death of King George VI on 6 February 1952, the unit was renamed as the Queen's Flight soon after the accession of Queen Elizabeth II. Fielden was created a Knight Commander of the Royal Victorian Order in June and in August was confirmed in his royal appointments as Extra Equerry and Captain of the Queen's Flight.

Fielden retired from the Queen's Flight in 1962. On 1 February 1962 he was appointed Senior Air Equerry to the Queen and promoted to air vice marshal. He was advanced to Knight Grand Cross of the Royal Victorian Order in 1968 and retired as Senior Air Equerry in 1969, resuming his status as Extra Equerry.

Fielden died on 8 November 1976 in Edinburgh, Scotland, at the age of 72.

== Family ==
In 1940 Fielden married Mary Angela Jodrell, daughter of Lieutenant Colonel Henry Ramsden and Dorothy Lynch Cotton-Jodrell, and granddaughter of Edward Cotton-Jodrell. He had a daughter and a son, Mark, who predeceased him, killed in a motor accident at Silverstone in 1963. His wife, Lady Fielden, died in 2014 at the age of 98.
