= Sandhurst =

Sandhurst often refers to:

- Royal Military Academy Sandhurst, near the town of Sandhurst in Berkshire, England
- Royal Military College, Sandhurst, its predecessor (before 1947)

Sandhurst may also refer to:

== Places ==
- Sandhurst, Berkshire, England, a town
- Sandhurst, Gloucestershire, England, a village
- Sandhurst, Kent, England, a village
- Sandhurst, Victoria, a suburb of Melbourne, Australia
- Bendigo, Victoria, Australia, formerly named Sandhurst
- Sandhurst Road, Mumbai, a railway station
- Sandhurst, Gauteng, South Africa, a suburb of Sandton

== People ==
- Baron Sandhurst, a title in the peerage of the United Kingdom
- Sandhurst Tacama Miggins (born 1986), fashion model from Trinidad and Tobago
- Basil Sandhurst, a Marvel Comics fictional character
- Margaret Sandhurst (1828–1892), British suffragist

== Other uses ==
- Sandhurst Competition, a military skills competition at West Point, US
- Sandhurst Las Vegas, a cancelled condominium project
- Sandhurst Trustees, a subsidiary of Bendigo and Adelaide Bank
