= Sandhurst Las Vegas =

- Interactive map of the Sandhurst Las Vegas area

General information
- Status: Never built
- Type: Condominium
- Location: Las Vegas, Nevada, United States
- Coordinates: 36.160871°N 115.156270°W

Technical details
- Floor count: 35 (tower one)

Design and construction
- Architecture firm: JMA Architecture
- Developer: Sandhurst Development

Other information
- Number of units: 398 (tower one)

The Sandhurst Las Vegas is a cancelled high-rise condominium and mixed-use project that was planned for construction in downtown Las Vegas. The project was announced in October 2004, with the New Jersey–based Sandhurst Development as the developer. The project was designed by JMA Architecture and was to include a 35-story tower with 398 units. Two additional towers were also planned early in the project's history.

Construction, which was initially expected to cost $180 million, was delayed several times due to rising costs. The project was ultimately cancelled in 2007. A year later, it was announced that the Grand Central Hotel would be built on the property, although it remains un-built as of 2018.

== History ==
Sandhurst Development, a company made up of former Citibank officials, had spent approximately three years researching the Las Vegas market before purchasing 3.2 acres (1.3 ha) from Union Pacific for $2.8 million in July 2004. In early October 2004, Sandhurst Development announced plans for a $180 million, 34-story tower with 409 condominium units that would be constructed on the property. The project was officially announced – as Sandhurst Las Vegas, Tower One – by Las Vegas Mayor Oscar Goodman during a weekly news conference on October 14, 2004.

The tower was to be located in downtown Las Vegas, at the northeast corner of Charleston Boulevard and Grand Central Parkway, east of Interstate 15. The tower would be located south of the Clark County Government Center parking lot, and near the under-construction World Market Center and the Las Vegas Premium Outlets North shopping mall. A presales launch was scheduled for December 2004. Sandhurst Development planned to begin groundbreaking on the project in March 2005, with completion expected by September 2006. At the time of the announcement, Union Pacific was in negotiations to sell its remaining land to Sandhurst Development, which planned to ultimately construct two additional condominium towers and commercial space on the property.

In December 2004, the project was approved by the Las Vegas City Council for 35 stories with 413 units. Sandhurst Development relocated its headquarters from New Jersey to Henderson, Nevada, to oversee the mixed-use project. The Sandhurst tower would have been the company's first Las Vegas project. Sales began in January 2005, with prices starting at $250,000, based on construction prices at the time. In early 2005, negotiations with Union Pacific were underway to purchase 12 additional acres that were located southwest of the 3.2-acre property. The land was to be used for a second tower that would be smaller than the 35-story tower. At that time, construction was expected to begin in June 2005, with completion in fall 2006. Residential Constructors was to construct the project.

=== Delays and cancellation ===
Construction did not begin as scheduled. Michael Mirolla of Sandhurst Development said that in July 2005, he backed off from beginning work on the project after learning that construction costs would be either 30 percent or 50 percent higher than initially expected. As a result, the starting price for units in the project increased to $475,000 that year. By October 2005, the project was scheduled for occupancy at the end of 2007. Preconstruction work on the site was underway in December 2005, as the tower was going through the final building approval process. Mirolla hoped to break ground in early January 2006, and said: "We made mistakes by projecting (construction) dates. Until you have a permit pulled, you can't tell. We're moving forward, but permits are taking a little longer than we thought. We had our full documents in with the city in May and here it is December. In September we were told to redesign the drainage. Now we go back to the engineers to redesign the drainage and that has to be approved. So we've learned a lot here."

In May 2006, Mirolla said construction costs had lowered from what they were in July 2005, and that he hoped to purchase building permits and begin construction within six weeks. Mirolla declined to identify the general contractor until all documents were signed. At the time, Mirolla was in the final stages of the loan process. Mirolla was in negotiations with Corus Bank as the primary lender, and had also met with JPS Capital. Later that month, Mirolla acknowledged rumors about the project's demise, confirming that the property had been privately listed for sale as a backup plan in the event of the project's cancellation. Although Mirolla had received offers for the property, he said the Sandhurst project was still being planned. At that time, construction costs were estimated at $200 million for the project, now with 398 condominium units; 45 percent of the units had been reserved up to that point, with starting prices now at $600,000 because of the rise in construction costs. The project was delayed that year because of the high construction costs, as investors in the project wanted to wait until the costs stabilized.

The project was cancelled in January 2007. Mirolla said he would return $7 million in deposits to 105 buyers, stating, "It doesn't mean this project won't come back. We just don't see the value of holding up our buyers. We're working with the group of investors who have title to the land, who still want to build Sandhurst, and if we can resurrect it, we'll reach out to the buyers." More than 60 percent of the project's condominiums were under contract, and the company had been negotiating with Corus Bank for approximately $250 million to finance construction, but Mirolla said that coming up with equity financing was difficult.

In February 2007, Joseph Manzella of Sandhurst Development said, "We're talking with investors right now. We're working hard for the building." That month, Sandhurst Development was given two weeks to demonstrate to the Las Vegas City Council that progress had been made on the project. Otherwise, Goodman said the approval for the project would be revoked. Goodman had been concerned about property "flippers" who purchase property, obtain city approval for a project to raise the value of the land, and then sell it for a profit without any intention of constructing the project. Manzella said, "If we don't get an extension on the site plan, it will only hurt our chances of landing an investor." The company had spent $12 million on the project up to that point. The City Council ultimately granted the company a six-month extension for the project, which did not materialize.

=== Future land development ===
In April 2008, it was announced that the Grand Central Hotel would be developed on the property by Grand Central Partners, a joint venture between Merill Group of Companies and Craig Katchen's Pierce Development. The project would consist of a 61-story hotel with 2,500 rooms, as well as 11,100 sq ft (1,030 m^{2}) of retail space and a 260,000 sq ft (24,000 m^{2}) convention center. The project was designed by JMA Architecture. As of 2018, no further information has been released and the project remains un-built.

== Design and amenities ==
Sandhurst Las Vegas was designed by JMA architecture. The first tower was to include a pool and a 700-space parking garage, while the ground floor would feature a 10,000 sq ft (930 m^{2}) restaurant and a 30,000 sq ft (2,800 m^{2}) spa and health club. The project's lower floors would also feature 35,000 sq ft (3,300 m^{2}) of commercial space for shops and other restaurants. Units in the first tower were to be located starting on the seventh floor, and would range in size from 800 sq ft (74 m^{2}) to 2,000 sq ft (190 m^{2}). Two-story penthouse duplexes would range from 2,400 sq ft (220 m^{2}) to 4,700 sq ft (440 m^{2}), with prices starting at $2 million. The tower would have had a total of 900,000 sq ft (84,000 m^{2}).
