= Thatched House Lodge =

House in Richmond Park, London, England

Coordinates: 51°25′39″N 0°17′7″W

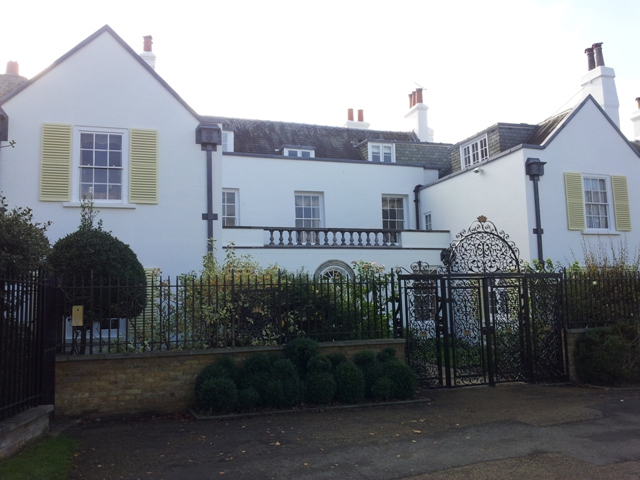
- Interactive map of Thatched House Lodge
- Location: Richmond Park TW10 5HP, London Borough of Richmond upon Thames, England, UK

History
- Built: 1673; enlarged 1727 and 1771

Site notes
- Architect: Sir John Soane in 1771
- Governing body: Crown Estate

Listed Building – Grade II
- Official name: Thatched House Lodge
- Designated: 6 October 1983
- Reference no.: 1242619

Thatched House Lodge is a Grade II-listed building, dating from the 17th century, in Richmond Park in the London Borough of Richmond upon Thames in London, England. It was the home of British prime minister Sir Robert Walpole and, since 1963, has been a royal residence, being leased from the Crown Estate by Princess Alexandra, The Honourable Lady Ogilvy (born Princess Alexandra of Kent), and, until his death in 2004, her husband, Sir Angus Ogilvy.

The main house has six reception rooms and six bedrooms, and it stands in four acres (1.6 hectares) of grounds. The property includes gardens, an 18th-century two-room thatched summer house which gave the main house its name, a gardener's cottage, stabling and other buildings.

== History ==
The residence was originally built as two houses in 1673 for two Richmond Park Keepers, as Aldridge Lodge. It was enlarged, possibly by William Kent, in 1727 as a home for Sir Robert Walpole. The two houses were joined in 1771 by Sir John Soane and renamed Thatched House Lodge. It had also been known as Burkitt's Lodge.

The house was used as a grace-and-favour residence by various members of the Royal Household including General Sir Edward Bowater, and General Lynedoch Gardiner, respectively equerry to Albert, Prince Consort and to Queen Victoria. Sir Frederick Treves, 1st Baronet retired to the house after he successfully operated on King Edward VII's appendix in 1902. Edward VII awarded use of the house to Sir Edmund Monson, 1st Baronet on his retirement from His Majesty's Diplomatic Service in 1905. Thatched House Lodge ceased to be a grace and favour property in 1927.

Thatched House Lodge was the home of Wing Commander Sir Louis Greig (equerry to George VI when he was Duke of York), who was deputy Ranger of Richmond Park from 1932. It was then acquired by George Sutherland-Leveson-Gower, 5th Duke of Sutherland. U.S. General Dwight D. Eisenhower was allotted a suite there during the Second World War.

== Leasehold details ==
The house was acquired on the open market by Angus Ogilvy through the purchase in 1963 of a sublease of the property from Clare, Duchess of Sutherland; he subsequently purchased the leasehold. The asking price for the sublease was £150,000, a considerable amount at the time. The property was held on a lease from the Crown Estate. In 1994, the Crown Estate granted Ogilvy an extension of the lease, to run for 150 years from 1994. Under the 1994 lease, a premium of £670,000 was payable to the Crown Estate, together with an annual rent of £1,000 for the first 25 years, rising in defined stages every 25 years to £6,000 per annum for the last 25 years. The lease required the leaseholder to put the property "in good and substantial repair" and to maintain it as such, to preserve the character of the property. According to the National Audit Office report on Thatched House Lodge, "considerable sums have been spent during the last 40 years of occupation".

The leasehold arrangements reflect the fact that the property was acquired by Ogilvy on a purely commercial basis, having acquired the sublease of the property for market value on the open market. The commercial nature of the leasehold is shown by the very considerable premium of £670,000 paid on the 1994 extension of the lease, with all maintenance at the expense of the leaseholder, and no charges resulting to the Crown Estate. Independent advice from a leading firm of chartered surveyors taken by the Crown Estate on the 1994 lease extension used the valuation methods applicable to a leaseholder's statutory rights on renewal of a lease. As the property was acquired in an open market transaction, the leasehold of the property may be sold except in the last five years of the lease. Therefore, although Thatched House Lodge is a royal residence by virtue of being inhabited by Princess Alexandra, it is in fact private property, the sub-lease of which was acquired on the open market, and the leasehold having been bought by Ogilvy. As a result, the property may be sold by the princess or her heirs, subject to the underlying Crown Estate long lease. The property is in an "exempted" area (Richmond Park) where freehold sales are not available.

The leasehold arrangements concerning Thatched House Lodge differ from the arrangements relating to other royal residences leased from the Crown Estate, Royal Lodge and Bagshot Park, leased by Andrew Mountbatten-Windsor and Prince Edward, Duke of Edinburgh respectively. In particular the Crown Estate never made a contribution towards restructuring Thatched House Lodge, as it did in the case of Royal Lodge and Bagshot Park, showing the non-commercial considerations which influenced those leases as opposed to Thatched House Lodge.

== See also ==
- List of British royal residences
