= Ogilvie (name) =

Ogilvie is a variant of the Scottish surname Ogilvy.

== People with the surname ==
- Ogilvie baronets
- Adam Ogilvie, Scottish footballer
- Albert Ogilvie (1890–1939), Australian politician, Premier of Tasmania
- Alec Ogilvie (1882–1962), pioneer British aviator
- Alexander Walker Ogilvie, Canadian politician
- Alick Ogilvie, Australian rules footballer who died in WWI
- Andy Ogilvie (born 1965), Canadian lacrosse player
- Bill Ogilvie (1932–2011), Scottish football player and manager
- Dame Bridget Ogilvie (born 1938), Australian scientist
- Campbell Ogilvie, Scottish football administrator (Rangers FC, Heart of Midlothian FC, Scottish Football Association)
- Charles Atmore Ogilvie (1793–1873), English priest
- Charles Ogilvie (disambiguation), several people
  - Charles Ogilvie (footballer), Scottish amateur footballer
  - Charles Ogilvie (sailor), Jamaican sailor
  - Charles Ogilvie (merchant), English merchant and politician
  - Charles Atmore Ogilvie, English priest
- David Ogilvie (disambiguation), several people
  - Dave Ogilvie, Canadian record producer and musician
  - David Ogilvie (cricketer) (born 1951), former Australian cricketer
- Duncan Ogilvie (1911–1967), Scottish footballer
- Edward Ogilvie (1814–1896), Australian politician
- Elisabeth Ogilvie (1917–2006), American writer
- Elizabeth Ogilvie (born 1946), Scottish artist
- Francis Grant Ogilvie (c.1858–1930), Scottish scientist and museum curator
- Francis Ogilvie (Governor), Governor of East Florida
- Frederick Ogilvie (1893–1949), Director-General of the BBC
- Fred Ogilvie, American politician, Missouri state representative
- Gary Ogilvie (born 1967), Scottish footballer
- George Ogilvie, 1988 Byron Kennedy Award winner
- Gordon Ogilvie (1934–2017), New Zealand historian
- James Ogilvie (disambiguation), several people
  - James Ogilvie (bishop) (died 1518), Scottish bishop
  - James Nicoll Ogilvie (1860–1926), Scottish minister
  - James Ogilvie (coach) (died 1950), American football player and coach
  - James Ogilvie-Grant, 11th Earl of Seafield (1876–1915), Scottish nobleman
- Joe Ogilvie (born 1974), American golfer
- John Ogilvie (disambiguation), several people
  - John Ogilvie (South African cricketer) (born 1958), South African cricketer
  - John Ogilvie (Wellington cricketer) (1931–2021), New Zealand cricketer
  - John Ogilvie (Central Districts cricketer) (born 1969), New Zealand cricketer
  - John Ogilvie (footballer) (1928-2020), Scottish footballer
  - John Ogilvie (lexicographer) (1797–1867), Scottish lexicographer
  - John Ogilvie (miller) (1833–1888), Canadian businessman and miller
  - John Ogilvie (poet) (1733–1813), Scottish reverend and poet
  - John Ogilvie (saint) (1579–1615), Scottish Jesuit martyr
- Kelvin Ogilvie (born 1942), Canadian chemist and senator
- Lauryn Ogilvie, Australian sport shooter
- Lawrence Ogilvie, plant pathologist in Bermuda and Britain
- Lloyd John Ogilvie (1930–2019), American minister and writer
- Major Ogilvie, American football player
- Malcolm Ogilvie, British ornithologist
- Maria Gordon (née Ogilvie) (1864–1939), Scottish geologist
- Marilyn Bailey Ogilvie, biographer of women scientists
- Nivek Ogre (born 1962), musician, real name Kevin Graham Ogilvie
- Richard B. Ogilvie (1923–1988), 1960s American politician
- Robert Ogilvie (1853–1938), England international footballer
- Robert Maxwell Ogilvie (1932–1981), classical scholar
- Sheilagh Ogilvie (born 1958), Canadian economic historian
- Walter Ogilvie of Dunlugas (died 1558), Scottish courtier and landowner
- William Ogilvie (disambiguation), several people
  - William Ogilvie of Pittensear (1736–1819), Scottish land reformer and 'rebel professor'
  - William Ogilvie (surveyor) (1846–1912), Canadian Commissioner of the Yukon Territory
  - William Ogilvie (Ardglass) (1740–1832), Scottish scholar and tutor
  - William Abernethy Ogilvie (1901–1989), Canadian painter and war artist
  - William Henry Ogilvie (1869–1963), Australian poet, author of Saddle For A Throne
  - William Robert Ogilvie-Grant (1863–1924), Scottish ornithologist
  - William Watson Ogilvie (1835–1900), Canadian pioneer

== Fictional characters ==
- Ogilvie Maurice Hedgehog, or better known as Sonic the Hedgehog, from the video game series of the same name.
- James Ogilvie, a fourth-year medical student, from The Pitt
- Parker Ogilvie, a minor character, from the game Canis Canem Edit
- Charles Ogilvy, Glenview High School principal (played by Leonard Teale) from the Australian soap opera Class of '74.

== See also ==
- Ogilvy (name)
