= Charles Ogilvie =

Charles Ogilvie may refer to:

- Charles Ogilvie (civil servant), British administrator in India and historian
- Charles Ogilvie (footballer), Scottish amateur footballer
- Charles Ogilvie (sailor), Jamaican sailor
- Charles Ogilvie (merchant), plantation owner, merchant and politician
- Charles Atmore Ogilvie, Church of England clergyman
