= John Ogilvie =

John Ogilvie may refer to:

- John Ogilvie (Canada), Ontario political candidate
- John Ogilvie (South African cricketer) (born 1958), South African cricketer
- John Ogilvie (Wellington cricketer) (born 1931), New Zealand cricketer
- John Ogilvie (Central Districts cricketer) (born 1969), New Zealand cricketer
- John Ogilvie (footballer) (1928-2020), Scottish footballer
- John Ogilvie (lexicographer) (1797–1867), Scottish lexicographer
- John Ogilvie (miller) (1833–1888), Canadian businessman and miller
- John Ogilvie (poet) (1733–1813), clergyman and poet
- John Ogilvie (saint) (1579–1615), Scottish Roman Catholic Jesuit martyr

== See also ==
- John Ogilvie High School, Hamilton, Scotland
- John Ogilvy (disambiguation)
