= Ogilvy =

The name Ogilvy may refer to:

- Ogilvy (name)
- Clan Ogilvy
- Ogilvy (department store), in Montreal, Canada
- Ogilvy (agency), an advertising agency, formerly known as Ogilvy & Mather
- Ogilvy Renault, Canadian law firm
- Ogilvy's, defunct department store in Ottawa, Canada

== See also ==
- Ogilvie (name)
- Ogilvie (disambiguation)
- George Ogilvy (disambiguation)
