= Ogilvy (name) =

- Pronunciation: /ˈoʊɡəlvi/

Origin
- Region of origin: Scotland

Other names
- Variant forms: Ogilvie, Ogilby, Oglesby

Ogilvy is a surname of Clan Ogilvy from Angus, Scotland; likely Pictish of toponymical origin and meaning "high plain".

== People with the surname ==
- Andrew Ogilvy (born 1988), basketball player
- Sir Angus Ogilvy (1928–2004), British businessman and husband of Princess Alexandra of Kent
- Bernie Ogilvy, New Zealand politician
- C. Stanley Ogilvy (1913–2000), American mathematician and sailor
- David Ogilvy (disambiguation), various people
  - David Ogilvy (businessman) (1911–1999), British advertising executive
  - David Ogilvy (cricketer) (1859–1917), Australian cricketer
  - David Ogilvy, 9th Earl of Airlie (1785–1849), Scottish representative peer, Lord Lieutenant of Angus 1826–1849
  - David Ogilvy, 10th Earl of Airlie (1826–1881), his son, Scottish representative peer
  - David Ogilvy, 11th Earl of Airlie (1856–1900), his son, Scottish soldier and representative peer
  - David Ogilvy, 12th Earl of Airlie (1893–1968), his son, Scottish Lord Chamberlain 1937–1965, 1936–1967
  - David Ogilvy, 13th Earl of Airlie (1926–2023), his son, Scottish Lord Chamberlain from 1984, Lord Lieutenant of Angus from 1989
  - David Ogilvy (1804–1871), first president of the Law Institute of Victoria
- Geoff Ogilvy (born 1977), Australian golfer
- George Ogilvy, 2nd Lord Banff (died 1668), Scottish Royalist
- George Ogilvy, 3rd Lord Banff (died 1713)
- Georg Benedikt von Ogilvy (1651–1710), Polish-Saxon Field Marshal
- Ian Ogilvy (born 1943), English actor
- James Ogilvy, several people
  - James Ogilvy (born 1964), member of the British royal family
  - James Ogilvy, 5th Lord Ogilvy of Airlie (died 1606), Scottish landowner and diplomat
  - James Ogilvy, 1st Earl of Airlie (1593–1666), Scottish royalist
  - James Ogilvy, 4th Earl of Findlater (1664–1730), Scottish politician
  - James Ogilvy, 6th Earl of Findlater (c. 1714–1770), Scottish earl
  - James Ogilvy, 7th Earl of Findlater (1750–1811), Scottish peer, amateur landscape architect and philanthropist
  - James Ogilvy-Grant, 9th Earl of Seafield (1817–1888), Scottish peer and member of parliament
- John Ogilvy (disambiguation), several people
  - Sir John Ogilvy, 9th Baronet, MP for Dundee
  - John Ogilvy, agent of William Cecil, 2nd Earl of Exeter and James VI
  - John Ogilvy-Grant, 7th Earl of Seafield
- Marion Ogilvy (died 1575), mistress of Cardinal Beaton
- Virginia Ogilvy
- William Ogilvy, several people
  - William Ogilvy, 8th Baronet of Inverquharity (c. 1765––1823)
  - William Ogilvy, Scottish politician and officer in the British Army,

== People with the given name ==
- Ogilvy Berlouis (1950-2018), Minister of Home Affairs of Seychelles from 1977 to 1979.

== Fictional characters ==
- Ogilvy, fake Oceanic soldier made up by Winston Smith in George Orwell's Nineteen Eighty-Four
- Ogilvy, astronomer in H. G. Wells' The War of the Worlds

== See also ==
- Ogilvie (name)
