= Eliza Ann McIntosh Reid =

Canadian churchworker and clubwoman (1841–1926)

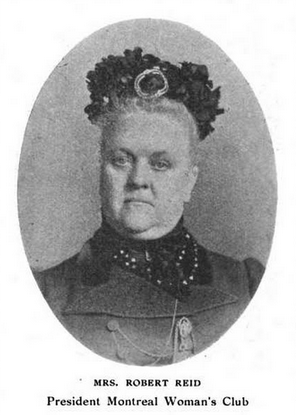
Eliza Ann McIntosh Reid, from a 1902 publication.

Eliza Ann McIntosh Reid (October 30, 1841 — January 8, 1926) was a Canadian churchworker and clubwoman, and an advocate for women's rights.

== Early life ==
Eliza Ann McIntosh was born in Montreal, Canada East, the daughter of Nicholas C. McIntosh and Margaret Brown McIntosh. Her parents were from Montrose, Angus in Scotland; her father was a cabinetmaker. The McIntoshs were members of the Unitarian Church from early in Eliza's life.

Two of Eliza Ann McIntosh's sisters married to George Washington Stephens, Sr., and George Washington Stephens, Jr. was her nephew. Her sister Frances McIntosh Stephens and another nephew were lost in the sinking of the Lusitania in 1915.

== Career ==
Eliza Ann McIntosh Reid was a leader in the Montreal Unitarian Church for decades, as director of the church's Unity Club and founder (in 1898) of the church's Young People's Alliance. She and her husband raised funds towards the building of the Church of the Messiah, and Eliza Ann Reid was on the board of managers for the new church. "So much of her life was lived for the church and so much of the inspiration of her many outside good works had its source in the church and in the life of the free spirit for which it stands," noted her daughter.

In 1892, Reid held a meeting at her home and there founded the Montreal Woman's Club, one of Canada's first women's organizations. She was the organization's president for its first ten years. She was also one of the founders and leaders of the Montreal Council of Women. Reid took an interest in a range of reform issues, from parks and playgrounds to temperance, public health, and immigration policy. She served on the board of directors of the Victorian Order of Nurses in Montreal in the 1920s.

== Personal life ==
Eliza Ann McIntosh married Scottish-born stone carver Robert Reid in 1867. They had four children born between 1868 and 1878. With Eliza's active support, daughter Helen Richmond Young Reid was in the first class of women to enroll at McGill University. Robert Reid died in 1919; in widowhood Eliza Ann Reid lived with her daughters until her own death in 1926. There was a Reid Room at the Church of the Messiah, named for Eliza and Helen Reid, until the building was destroyed in 1987.
