= George Ogilvy =

George Ogilvy or Ogilvie may refer to:

- George Ogilvy, 1st Lord Banff (c. 1587–1663), Scottish royalist army officer
- George Ogilvy, 2nd Lord Banff (died 1668), member of the Scottish Parliament
- George Ogilvy, 3rd Lord Banff (c. 1649–1713), member of the Scottish Parliament
- Sir George Ogilvy, 1st Baronet (fl. 1634–1679), Scottish royalist army officer
- George Drummond Ogilvie (1882–1966), British Indian Army officer
- George Ogilvie (footballer) (1899–1957), Australian rules footballer
- George Ogilvie (1931–2020), Australian theatre director and actor

== See also ==
- Ogilvy (disambiguation)
