= William Ogilvie =

William Ogilvie may refer to:

- William Ogilvie of Pittensear (1736–1819), Scottish land reformer and 'rebel professor'
- William Ogilvie (surveyor) (1846–1912), Canadian surveyor and Commissioner of the Yukon Territory
- William Ogilvie (Ardglass) (1740–1832), Scottish-born scholar and tutor
- William Abernethy Ogilvie (1901–1989), Canadian painter and war artist
- William Henry Ogilvie (1869–1963), Scottish-Australian poet, author of Saddle For A Throne
- William Heneage Ogilvie (1887-1971), British surgeon and medical essayist
- William Robert Ogilvie-Grant (1863–1924), Scottish ornithologist
- William Watson Ogilvie (1835–1900), Canadian pioneer

== See also ==
- William Ogilvy, 8th Baronet of Inverquharity (c. 1765––1823), father of Sir John Ogilvy, 9th Baronet (also spelt Ogilvie)
- William Ogilvy, Scottish officer in the British Army, briefly MP
