= David Ogilvy =

David Ogilvy may refer to:

- David Ogilvy (businessman) (1911–1999), British advertising executive
- David Ogilvy (cricketer) (1859–1917), Australian cricketer
- David Ogilvy, 3rd Earl of Airlie (died 1717), Scottish peer
- David Ogilvy, 6th Earl of Airlie (1725–1803), Scottish nobleman and Jacobite military officer
- David Ogilvy, 9th Earl of Airlie (1785–1849), Scottish representative peer, Lord Lieutenant of Angus 1826–1849
- David Ogilvy, 10th Earl of Airlie (1826–1881), his son, Scottish representative peer
- David Ogilvy, 11th Earl of Airlie (1856–1900), his son, Scottish soldier and representative peer
- David Ogilvy, 12th Earl of Airlie (1893–1968), his son, Scottish soldier, peer, and courtier
- David Ogilvy, 13th Earl of Airlie (1926–2023), his son, Scottish Lord Chamberlain 1984-1997, Lord Lieutenant of Angus 1989-2001
- David Ogilvy (1804–1871), first president of the Law Institute of Victoria

== See also ==
- David Ogilvie (disambiguation)
- Ogilvy (name)
