= Montréal-Centre (provincial electoral district) =

Former provincial electoral district in Quebec, Canada

Quebec electoral district

Defunct provincial electoral district
- Legislature: National Assembly of Quebec
- District created: 1867
- District abolished: 1890
- First contested: 1867
- Last contested: 1887 (by-election)

Montréal-Centre was a former provincial electoral district in the Montreal region of Quebec, Canada that elected members to the Legislative Assembly of Quebec.

It was created for the 1867 election. Its final general election was in 1886 (and there was a by-election in 1887). It disappeared in the 1890 election and its successor electoral districts were Montréal division no. 2 and Montréal division no. 6.

== Members of the Legislative Assembly ==
- Edward Brock Carter, Conservative Party (1867–1871)
- Luther Hamilton Holton, Liberal (1871–1874)
- Charles Alexander, Liberal (1874–1875)
- Alexander Walker Ogilvie, Conservative Party (1875–1878)
- Horatio Admiral Nelson, Liberal (1878–1881)
- George Washington Stephens Sr., Liberal (1881–1886)
- James McShane, Liberal (1886–1890)
