= Charles Alexander (politician) =

Canadian politician

MLA for Montréal-Centre
- In office 1874–1875
- Preceded by: Luther Hamilton Holton
- Succeeded by: Alexander Walker Ogilvie

Personal details
- Born: 13 June 1816 Dundee, Scotland
- Died: 5 November 1905 (aged 89) Montreal, Quebec
- Party: Liberal

Charles Alexander (13 June 1816 – 5 November 1905) was a Scottish-born merchant and political figure in Quebec. He represented Montréal-Centre in the Legislative Assembly of Quebec from 1874 to 1875 as a Liberal.

He was born in Dundee, the son of John Alexander and Murina Mudie, and was educated there. He worked for a firm that manufactured marmalade. Alexander was married Margaret Kyle in 1838. In 1840, he came to Lower Canada with his family after the company opened a branch in Montreal. In 1841, he operated a business in London, Upper Canada with a partner but, in 1842, returned to Montreal and opened a confectionery store there the following year. He expanded into manufacturing, wholesale sales and catering; Alexander also operated a dining room and ice cream parlour.

Alexander served on the municipal council for Montreal from 1865 to 1875. He helped found the Society for the Protection of Women and Children in 1869, serving as its vice-president. In the same year, he was co-founder and president for the Protestant Institution for Deaf-Mutes and for the Blind. In 1870, Alexander helped found the Boys' Home of Montreal, also serving as its president. He also was president of the Canadian Society for the Prevention of Cruelty to Animals in Montreal. Alexander was a director for the Sun Mutual Life Insurance Company of Montreal, the Montreal Loan and Mortgage Company and the Mount Royal Cemetery Company.

Alexander was elected to the Quebec assembly in an 1874 by-election held after Luther Hamilton Holton resigned his seat. He was defeated by Alexander Walker Ogilvie when he ran for reelection in 1875. Alexander was married a second time to Mary Ann Patton in 1884. He died in Montreal at the age of 89 after falling from a second story window in his home. Alexander was buried in the Mount Royal Cemetery.
