= RMS Grampian =

British ocean liner, in service 1907–1921

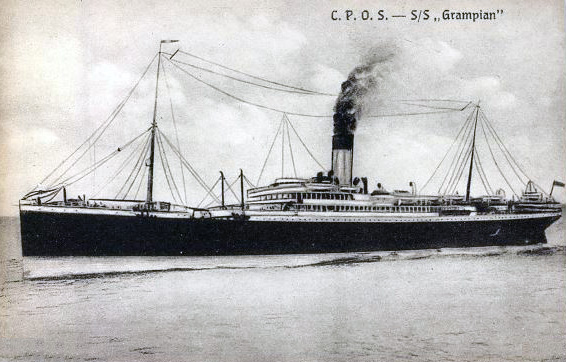
- Postcard of RMS Grampian

History

United Kingdom
- Name: Grampian
- Namesake: Grampian Mountains
- Owner: 1907: Allan Line SS Co Ltd
- Operator: 1907: J&A Allan; 1910: Allan Bros & Co; 1917: Canadian Pacific Ocean Services; 1921: Canadian Pacific SS Ltd
- Port of registry: Glasgow
- Route: 1907: Glasgow – Quebec – Montreal; 1919: Liverpool – Montreal
- Builder: Alexander Stephen & Sons, Glasgow
- Yard number: 422
- Launched: 25 July 1907
- Completed: 1907
- Out of service: 1921
- Refit: 1921, abandoned after fire
- Identification: UK official number 124220; code letters HLKW; call sign MRN
- Fate: damaged by fire 1921; scrapped 1925–26

General characteristics
- Type: Ocean liner
- Tonnage: 1907: 9,603 GRT, 6,119 NRT; 1910: 10,947 GRT, 7,033 NRT; 1914: 10,074 GRT, 6,439 NRT
- Length: 485.7 ft (148.0 m)
- Beam: 60.2 ft (18.3 m)
- Depth: 38.1 ft (11.6 m)
- Decks: 2
- Installed power: 825 NHP
- Propulsion: 2 × triple expansion engines; 2 × screws
- Speed: 17 knots (31 km/h)
- Capacity: Passengers: 210 × 1st class; 250 × 2nd class; 1,000 × 3rd class
- Crew: 350
- Sensors & processing systems: by 1910: submarine signalling
- Notes: sister ship: Hesperian

RMS Grampian was a transatlantic ocean liner that was built in Scotland in 1907 and scrapped in the Netherlands in 1925. She was operated originally by Allan Line, and later by Canadian Pacific Steamships. In the First World War she remained in commercial service but carried Canadian troops. In 1919 she survived a collision with an iceberg. In 1921 she was gutted by fire while being refitted. The refit was abandoned, and in 1925–26 she was scrapped.

Grampian was a sister ship of the RMS Hesperian.

== Building and equipment ==
In 1907 Alexander Stephen and Sons built a pair of sister ships for Allan Line in Linthouse, Glasgow. Grampian was yard number 422. She was launched on July 25, 1907, and completed later that year. Her sister Hesperian was yard number 425. She was launched on December 20, 1907, and completed in 1908.

Grampian's registered length was 485.7 ft (148.0 m), her beam was 60.2 ft (18.3 m) and her depth was 38.1 ft (11.6 m). She had berths for 1,460 passengers: 210 first class, 250 second class and 1,000 third class. As built, her tonnages were 9,603 GRT, 6,119 NRT.

Grampian had twin screws, each driven by a three-cylinder triple expansion engine. Between them her twin engines were rated at 825 NHP and gave her a speed of 17 knots (31 km/h).

Allan Line registered Grampian at Glasgow. Her UK official number was 124220 and her code letters were HLKW. In 1907 she made her maiden voyage from Glasgow to Montreal via Quebec.

By 1910 Grampian had been equipped for submarine signalling and wireless telegraphy. The Marconi Company supplied and operated her wireless. Her call sign was MRN. By 1911 her tonnages were reassessed as 10,947 GRT and 7,033 NRT. By 1914 they had been reassessed again as 10,074 GRT and 6,439 NRT.

== First World War ==
In the First World War, Grampian remained in commercial service, but carried members of the Canadian Expeditionary Force from Canada to Europe. In 1915 a U-boat torpedoed her sister ship Hesperian in the Western Approaches, killing 32 people. Hesperian was taken in tow, but sank two days later.

In 1917 Canadian Pacific took over Allan Line. Grampian remained in Allan Line ownership, and registered in Glasgow, but was now managed by Canadian Pacific.

== Iceberg ==
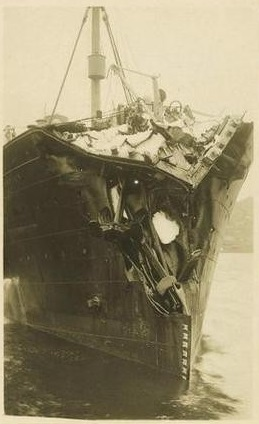
Grampian's bow after hitting the iceberg

In July 1919 Grampian was on an eastbound voyage from Montreal to Liverpool, carrying 750 passengers and a crew of 350. Early on the evening of July 9 she was in fog about 45 nautical miles (83 km) off Cape Race, Newfoundland when she sighted an iceberg. It was too close to avoid a collision, so her Master decided to hit the iceberg head-on.

Grampian's bow was stove in by nearly 40 feet (12 m), killing two stewards in the fo'c's'le and injuring another steward and a stoker. But the damage did not extend below her waterline, and the iceberg was prevented from scraping down the side of her hull, which could have ruptured enough watertight compartments to sink her. She diverted to St John's, Newfoundland for emergency repairs.

Grampian's passengers were transferred to RMS Empress of Britain to complete their journey to Liverpool. Grampian was given a temporary timber bow to enable her to reach a port she could receive permanent repairs.

== Refit and fire ==
In 1921 Grampian was in Antwerp being refitted. On March 14 she caught fire and was badly damaged. Her owners abandoned the ship to her underwriters. She was scrapped in the Netherlands, but sources differ as to when and where. One states that it was in July 1925 at Hendrik-Ido-Ambacht. Another states that it was by F Rysdyk in Rotterdam in 1926.

== Bibliography ==
- Haws, Duncan (1979). The Ships of the Union, Castle, Union-Castle, Allan and Canadian Pacific lines. Merchant Fleets in Profile. Vol. 3. Cambridge: Patrick Stephens Ltd. ISBN 0-85059-352-2.
- Lloyd's Register of British and Foreign Shipping. Vol. I.–Steamers. London: Lloyd's Register of Shipping. 1907 – via Internet Archive.
- Lloyd's Register of British and Foreign Shipping. Vol. I.–Steamers. London: Lloyd's Register of Shipping. 1910 – via Internet Archive.
- Lloyd's Register of Shipping. Vol. I.–Steamers. London: Lloyd's Register of Shipping. 1914.
- Lloyd's Register of Shipping. Vol. II.–Steamers. London: Lloyd's Register of Shipping. 1917 – via Internet Archive.
- Lloyd's Register of Shipping. Vol. II.–Steamers. London: Lloyd's Register of Shipping. 1920 – via Internet Archive.
- Lloyd's Register of Shipping. Vol. II.–Steamers. London: Lloyd's Register of Shipping. 1921 – via Internet Archive.
- Lloyd's Register of Shipping. Vol. II.–Steamers. London: Lloyd's Register of Shipping. 1924 – via Internet Archive.
- The Marconi Press Agency Ltd (1913). The Year Book of Wireless Telegraphy and Telephony. London: The St Katherine Press.
- Oldfield, Paul (2016). Victoria Crosses on the Western Front – 1917 to Third Ypres: 27 January – 27 July 1917. Barnsley: Pen and Sword Books. ISBN 978-1-4738-8489-2.
- "Liner with 1,100 aboard smashes bow on iceberg to avert a Titanic disaster". The Evening World. New York, NY: Joseph Pulitzer. July 10, 1919. p. 1. ISSN 1941-0654. OCLC 9368601 – via Chronicling America.
- "Skipper saves big liner from Titanic's fate". New-York Tribune. July 11, 1919. p. 1. ISSN 1941-0646. OCLC 9405688 – via Chronicling America.
- "Allan Liner With 1,100 on Board Hits an Iceberg, Two Are Killed". The New York Times. July 11, 1919. p. 13 – via Times Machine.
- "Body found on Grampian". The New York Times. July 12, 1919. p. 3 – via Times Machine.
