= Helen Richmond Young Reid =

Canadian social reformer

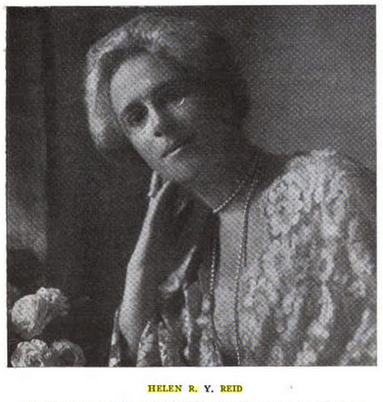
Helen R. Y. Reid, from a 1917 publication.

Helen Richmond Young Reid CBE (December 11, 1869 – June 8, 1941) was a Canadian social reformer, focused on public health and women's education. In 1935 she was named a Commander of the Order of the British Empire for her life's work.

== Early life ==
Helen Richmond Young Reid was born in Montreal, Quebec, the daughter of Eliza Ann McIntosh Reid and Robert Reid. Her mother was a Unitarian church worker and founder of the Montreal Woman's Club; her father, born in Scotland, had a successful business in granite and marble. Helen was educated at the Montreal School for Girls. She and several classmates decided to apply to McGill University, though the school was not open to female students. Her mother persuaded Donald A. Smith to make an endowment to the university, to cover the cost of separate classes for women; in 1884, Helen was in the first class of "Donaldas", as women admitted to McGill were called, along with Octavia Ritchie. She finished there in 1889, and pursued further studies at the University of Geneva.

== Career ==
Helen R. Y. Reid and some of her McGill classmates opened a settlement house in Montreal, offering housing, meals, evening classes, and club activities for young women in the city's newer immigrant communities. In 1895 they opened the city's first children's library. She served on the board of the Montreal Council of Women (1900-1903), and helped start Montreal's chapter of the Victorian Order of Nurses.

Reid directed the Montreal branch of the Canadian Patriotic Fund's ladies' auxiliary during World War I, and lectured in the United States about her work. She was honored by George V for her wartime work. She also received medals from the French government and from the Italian Red Cross. After the war, she helped build the School of Nursing and the School of Social Work at McGill, and was the latter program's director for fifteen years. She also ran a health clinic for veterans and their families.

Reid was a contributing editor to Women of Canada: Their Life and Work, a book compiled as part of Canada's participation in the Paris International Exposition in 1900. She also wrote War Relief in Canada (1917), A Social Study Along Health Lines (1920), The Ukrainian Canadians (1931, with Charles H. Young), Lest We Forget (1936), and The Japanese Canadians (1939, with Charles H. Young). She was an officer of the Canadian Public Health Association, and of the Family Welfare Association of America, and of the Canadian Welfare Council, and served on the Dominion Council of Health. She was president of the Montreal Council of Social Agencies and of the Child Welfare Association.

In 1935, Helen Richmond Young Reid was made a Commander of the Order of the British Empire in recognition for her lifetime of "philanthropic services in the Dominion of Canada". She was still active with the Victorian Order of Nurses in 1937.

== Personal life ==
In her last illness Reid was assisted by fellow social worker and friend Jane Wisdom. Helen R. Y. Reid died in 1941, aged 71 years. There is a scholarship named for her at McGill University, and her library was donated to the university's library at her death. Some of her papers are archived at McCord Museum.
