= RMS Hesperian =

British passenger ship (1907–1915)

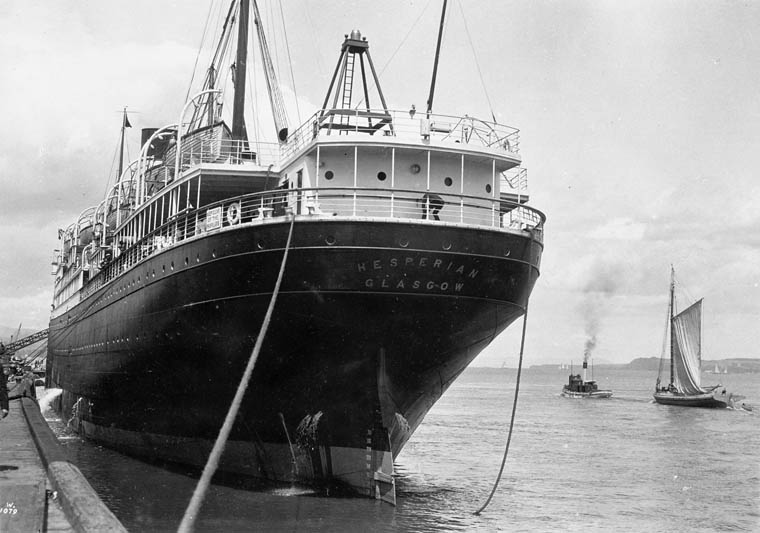

History

United Kingdom
- Name: Hesperian
- Namesake: Garden of the Hesperides
- Owner: Allan Line (1907–1910); Canadian Pacific Line (1910–1915)
- Port of registry: United Kingdom, Glasgow
- Route: Liverpool – Quebec – Montreal
- Builder: Alexander Stephen and Sons
- Yard number: 425
- Laid down: 1907
- Launched: 20 December 1907
- Completed: 1908
- Acquired: 1908
- Maiden voyage: 25 April 1908
- In service: 25 April 1908
- Out of service: 6 September 1915
- Identification: Official number: 124266
- Fate: Torpedoed and sunk on 6 September 1915

General characteristics
- Type: Passenger ship
- Tonnage: 10,920 GRT
- Length: 147.8 metres (484 ft 11 in)
- Beam: 18.3 metres (60 ft 0 in)
- Depth: 9.1 metres (29 ft 10 in)
- Installed power: Twin triple expansion engines
- Propulsion: 2 screw propellers
- Speed: 15 knots (28 km/h; 17 mph)
- Capacity: 1,460 passengers (210 1st-class, 250 2nd-class & 1,000 steerage)
- Notes: sister ship: Grampian

RMS Hesperian was a British ocean liner that was torpedoed and sunk by the German submarine U-20 85 nautical miles (157 km; 98 mi) south west by south of the Fastnet Rock in the Atlantic Ocean on 4 September 1915 with the loss of 32 lives, while she was travelling from Liverpool, United Kingdom to Montreal, Canada.

== Construction ==
Hesperian was launched for the Allan Line at the Alexander Stephen and Sons shipyard in Glasgow, Scotland on 20 December 1907, and completed the following year. The ship was 147.8 metres (484 ft 11 in) long, had a beam of 18.3 metres (60 ft 0 in) and a depth of 9.1 metres (29 ft 10 in). She was assessed at 10,920 GRT and had a pair of triple expansion engines producing 802 nhp, driving twin screw propellers. The ship could reach a maximum speed of 15 knots (28 km/h; 17 mph) and had two masts and one funnel. As built, she had the capacity to carry 210 1st-class, 250 2nd-class and 1,000 steerage passengers. She had a sister ship named Grampian.

== Early career ==
For her maiden voyage she sailed from Liverpool on 25 April 1908, calling also at Quebec, en route to Montreal. Hesperian was chartered to the Canadian Pacific Line in January 1910, where she also served the Glasgow - Halifax - Boston route.

== Attack and sinking ==
Hesperian departed Liverpool for Montreal on 3 September 1915 at 7 pm under the command of Captain William Main. The ship was carrying 814 passengers and 300 crew, among the passengers were also wounded Canadian soldiers returning home from the front lines. Also on board was the metal casket of Frances Stephens which was boxed in a wooden crate. The widow of Canadian politician George Stephens had been lost in the sinking of the RMS Lusitania four months prior and was being repatriated for burial next to her husband in Montreal.

Having barely left port and sailing in a zigzagging motion, Hesperian was struck by a single torpedo at her starboard bow at 8.30 pm, damaging the forward engine room and causing a list to starboard. Captain Main ordered to halt the ship and rang the alarm bells. An SOS was sent out, while the ship's officers prepared and lowered the lifeboats. There was no panic amongst passengers and crew and the evacuation occurred in an orderly fashion. However, a lifeboat on the port side upset while lowering, leading to all her 32 occupants drowning. Meanwhile, a group of British warships came to aid Hesperian and took all survivors aboard and back ashore to Ireland. The vessel had been evacuated within an hour and although riding low in the water, her bulkheads held and the ship stayed afloat. Only the captain and a skeleton crew remained aboard as they had hopes to either beach the ship or have her towed to Queenstown. It was while under tow to Ireland that Hesperian ultimately gave away and sank some 37 miles (60 km) from the Irish coast on 6 September 1915, not far from the wreck of the Lusitania. Mrs. Stephens' casket also went down with the ship, ironically close to the ship that took her life and as it turned out, Hesperian had also been sunk by the same submarine and commander as the Lusitania.

To deflect criticism of the sinking, the German Foreign Office claimed that no submarines were operating in the area and that she "probably hit a mine".

== Wreck ==
The wreck of Hesperian lies 130 miles (210 km) west of Cobh, Ireland in 377 feet (115 m) of water. Her wreck was the site of a few 'grave robbing' incidents, when local Irish fishermen caught some artifacts from the wreck in their nets in November 2017.

== See also ==
- RMS Lusitania
- SS Arabic (1902)
- SS Sussex
