= Edmund Graves Meredith Cape =

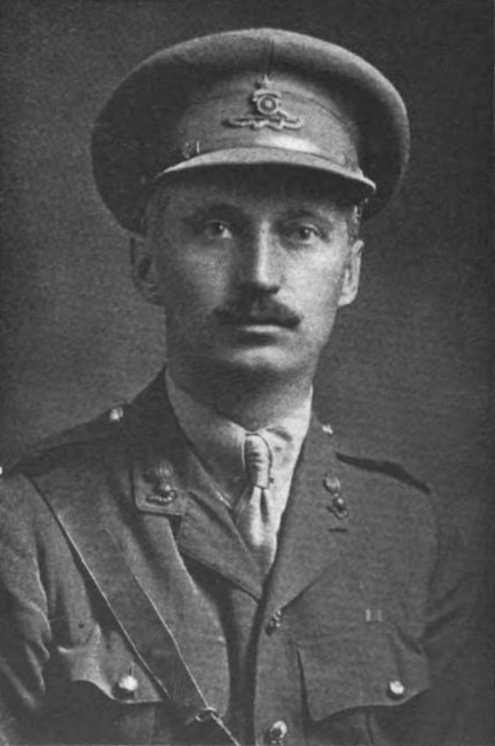
- Born: August 7, 1878; Hamilton, Ontario
- Died: September 28, 1962 (aged 84); Montreal, Quebec
- Education: McGill University
- Occupation(s): Engineer, military officer
- Spouse: Lillian Guest Smith (m. 1908)
- Children: 4

Lieutenant Colonel Edmund Graves Meredith Cape, DSO (August 7, 1878 – September 28, 1962) was the founding president of E.G.M. Cape & Co., Engineers and Contractors of Montreal, and a governor of the Montreal General Hospital. He raised and commanded the 3rd Battery, Canadian Siege Artillery, and was later appointed commanding officer of the 2nd Medium Brigade, Royal Regiment of Canadian Artillery. His home on Redpath Crescent was one of the last houses put up in the Golden Square Mile.

== Early life ==
Born at Hamilton, Ontario, he was the son of John Cape (1841–1908) and Margaret Kittson (1843–1887), daughter of William Henry Kittson (1810–1882), Collector of Customs at Hamilton. He took his middle names from the family of his maternal grandmother, Harriet Meredith, sister of Edmund Allen Meredith. His maternal grandfather, William Kittson, was a stepson of Alexander Henry and brother of Norman Kittson. Educated at Hamilton and McGill University (B.A.Sc., 1898).

== Career ==
He started his career as the Assistant Engineer of the Lake Superior Power Company at Sault Ste. Marie. He was promoted to chief engineer during the construction of the Canada Car Company, and afterwards practised for some years as a Civil Engineer at Montreal. In 1908, he founded E.G.M. Cape & Co., Engineers and Contractors of Montreal. He retired as chairman of the board in 1958. He was a member of the Engineering Institute of Canada and of the Montreal Board of Trade. He was a governor of the Montreal General Hospital and the Western General Hospital.

== First World War ==
In the autumn of 1915, Major Cape of the 2nd Field Regiment, Royal Canadian Artillery raised and commanded 3rd Battery, Canadian Siege Artillery and took them to Europe. After further training in England, in June 1916, Cape accompanied the Battery to France. Cape fought in the Battle of the Somme and was wounded at the Battle of Vimy Ridge. He was twice mentioned in Douglas Haig's Despatches for distinguished service under enemy fire. He was awarded the Distinguished Service Order. In 1920, upon reorganization of the Canadian Militia, lieutenant colonel Cape was appointed Commanding Officer of the 2nd Medium Brigade, Montreal.

== Family ==
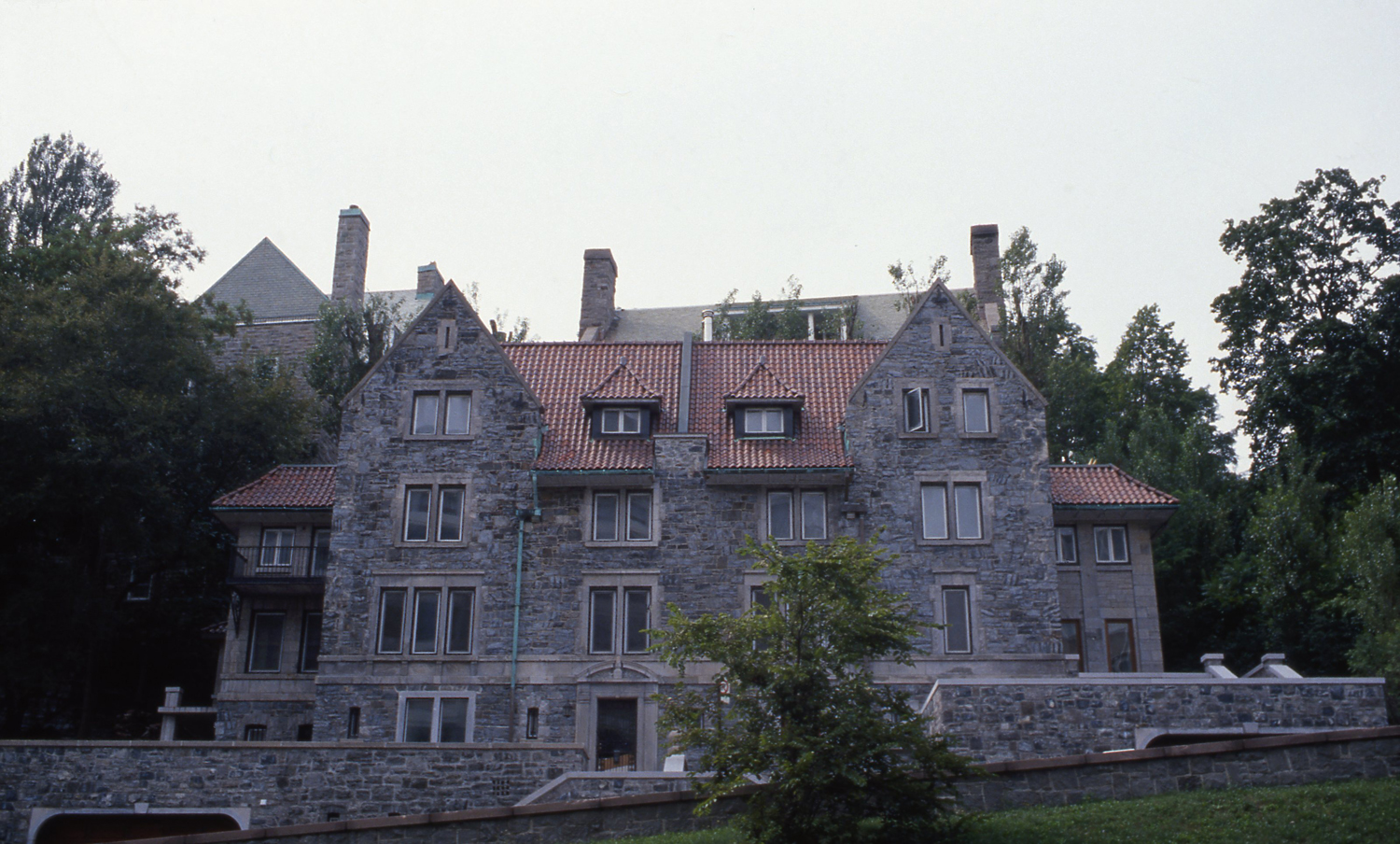
Cape's home on Redpath Crescent in Montreal, near Pine Avenue

In 1908, Cape married Lillian Guest Smith of Montreal. They had three sons and one daughter,

- Brigadier General John Meredith Cape MBE (1910–2005) of the Royal Regiment of Canadian Artillery. Educated at Selwyn House School, Trinity College School, McGill University and the Royal Military College of Canada. Succeeded his father as chairman of E.G.M. Cape & Co. In 1936, he married Mary Elizabeth Ogilvie, daughter of Lieutenant Colonel Gavin Lang Ogilvie (youngest son of William Watson Ogilvie) and his wife Mary Gzowski, granddaughter of Sir Casimir Gzowski.
- Margaret Meredith Cape. Known as Peggy, in 1935 she married Robert Reford MacDougall, son of Hartland MacDougall and his wife Edith, daughter of Robert Wilson Reford. Her husband was a brother-in-law of Hartland Molson.
- Edmund Vimy Meredith Cape (1919–1938). Educated at Trinity College School and in Switzerland. He drowned in icy waters after a canoe accident while fishing in Quebec.
- David George Meredith Cape (1923–2015). Educated at Lower Canada College and McGill University, lieutenant, The Black Watch (Royal Highland Regiment) of Canada, MD, founded and practiced medicine (anaesthesiology) at the Lakeshore General Hospital, Pointe Claire, Que. until 2008. In 1945, he married Anne Colhoun Duncanson, daughter of Brig. Andrew E. Duncanson, DSO, OBE, and his wife, Annie Colhoun, divorced 1969, married Sharon Power in 1969, divorced 1982, married Helene Papachristidis Holden, daughter of shipowner, Phrixos Basil Papachristidis, and his wife, Mariette Vachon in 1995.

Cape was a member of the St. James's; Mount Royal; Forest and Stream; Montreal Hunt; Montreal Racquet; Montreal Indoor Tennis; Royal Montreal Golf and Royal St. Lawrence Yacht clubs. In September 1962, Colonel Cape died after a short illness at the Royal Victoria Hospital, Montreal.
