= Ogilvie =

Ogilvie is a surname of Scottish origin. It may also refer to:

== People ==
- Ogilvie (name)

== Places ==
=== Australia ===
- Ogilvie, Western Australia

=== Canada ===
- Ogilvie, Nova Scotia
- Ogilvie Aerodrome, Yukon
- Ogilvie Mountains, a mountain range in Yukon

=== Scotland ===
- Ogilvie, Angus near Glamis

=== United States ===
- Ogilvie, Minnesota
- Ogilvie Transportation Center, a commuter-rail terminal in Chicago, Illinois
- Mount Ogilvie, a mountain on Alaska–British Columbia boundary

== Education ==
- John Ogilvie High School, Hamilton, Scotland
- Ogilvie High School, Hobart, Tasmania
- Ogilvie Institute, Catholic college in Aberdeen, Scotland

== Other ==
- Ogilvie syndrome, a medical condition
- Surname of a minor character in Dashiell Hammett's The Main Death

== See also ==
- Ogilvy (disambiguation)
