= David Ogilvie =

David Ogilvie may refer to:

- Dave Ogilvie, Canadian record producer and musician
- David Ogilvie (cricketer) (born 1951), former Australian cricketer

== See also ==
- David Ogilvy (disambiguation)
- Ogilvie (disambiguation)
