= Horatio Admiral Nelson =

Canadian politician

Member of the Legislative Assembly of Quebec for Montréal-Centre
- In office 1878–1881
- Preceded by: Alexander Walker Ogilvie
- Succeeded by: George Washington Stephens

Personal details
- Born: October 22, 1816 Richmond, New Hampshire
- Died: December 24, 1882 (aged 66) Montreal, Quebec
- Party: Liberal

Horatio Admiral Nelson (October 22, 1816 – December 24, 1882) was an American-born merchant, manufacturer and political figure in Quebec. He represented Montréal-Centre in the Legislative Assembly of Quebec from 1878 to 1881 as a Liberal.

He was born in Richmond, New Hampshire, the son of Ezekiel Nelson and Ruth Harkins, and was educated in the United States. Nelson was a travelling salesman until 1841, when he settled in Montreal. In 1841, he married Maria D. Davison. He was co-owner of Nelson and Butters, which manufactured brooms and other articles made from wood; the company became Nelson Wood & Co. in 1861 and H.A. Nelson and Sons in 1874. Nelson was a director for the Molson Bank, president of the Loan and Investment Association and vice-president of the Provincial Loan Association. He served on Montreal city council from 1867 to 1881 and was president of the finance committee. He died in Montreal at the age of 66.
