= Frances Stephens (philanthropist) =

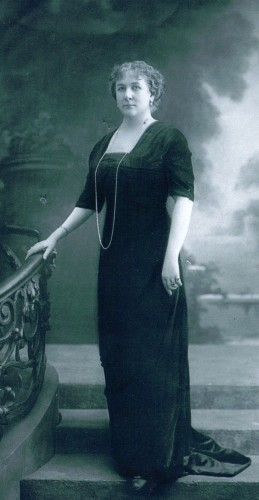
Frances Stephens circa 1900.

Frances Stephens (January 27, 1851 – May 7, 1915) was a Canadian philanthropist of Scottish origin and a prominent woman of Montreal society.

Frances Ramsey McIntosh was born in Montreal, Quebec in 1851, the daughter of Nicholas C. McIntosh and Margaret Brown McIntosh. Both of her parents were from Montrose, Angus in Scotland. One of her sisters was Eliza Ann McIntosh Reid, a prominent clubwoman in Montreal.

In 1878, Frances McIntosh married the landowner and lawyer George Washington Stephens, Sr., who become Cabinet Minister of Québec. They had a son, Francis Chattan Stephens (1887–1918), and two daughters.

She and her infant grandson both died on the luxury steamboat RMS Lusitania, which was sunk by U-20, a German submarine. En route to Canada for interment next to her predeceased husband, her body and casket were lost at sea as the ship transporting it, the RMS Hesperian, was sunk by the same submarine. In American media, this was referred to as a double jeopardy (double murder).
