= Sir George Ogilvy, 1st Baronet =

Scottish royalist military officer

Sir George Ogilvy, 1st Baronet (sometimes spelled Ogilvie) was a Scottish royalist military officer, known for his defence of Dunnottar Castle in 1652.

== Early life ==
Ogilvy was descended from the Ogilvys of Balnagarno, Forfarshire, and was the son of William Ogilvy of Lumgair, Kincardineshire, by Katherine, niece of Strahan of Thornton. In 1634 he married Elizabeth, daughter of Sir John Douglas of Barras, Forfarshire, fourth son of William Douglas, 9th Earl of Angus, and purchased Barras from his father-in-law.

== Defence of Dunnottar Castle ==
Having in early life served in the German wars, he was in 1651 appointed by the Earl Marischal, with the title of lieutenant-governor, to hold the earl's castle of Dunnottar against the forces of Cromwell. Special importance attached to the trust committed to him from the fact that the regalia of Scotland had been placed in the castle, but for the supply of armaments and provisions he was almost wholly dependent on his own exertions.

On 31 August 1651 the committee of estates addressed an order to the Earl of Balcarres authorising him to receive the regalia from Ogilvy, whom they directed to deliver them up to Balcarres; but Ogilvy declined to do so on the ground that Balcarres was not properly authorised to relieve him of the responsibility which had been imposed on him by parliament. He, however, declared his readiness to deliver them up if relieved of responsibility, or his readiness to defend his charge to the last if properly supplied with men, provisions, and ammunition. The castle was summoned by Cromwell's troops to surrender on 8 and 22 November, but Ogilvy expressed his determination to hold out. While the castle was closely besieged, the regalia were, at the instance of the Countess Dowager Marischal, delivered by Lady Ogilvy to Mrs Grainger, the wife of the minister of Kinneff, who concealed them about her person, and, passing the lines of the besiegers without suspicion, took them to the church of Kinneff, where they were placed below the floor. Although Ogilvy had received a warrant from the Earl Marischal empowering him to deliver up the castle to Major-general Deane, he maintained a firm attitude until he obtained terms as favourable as it was possible to grant. On 1 February 1652 he sent a letter to the king asking for supplies of ammunition and provisions. These were not granted him, but on 12 April the king sent him a message approving of his fidelity, urging him to hold out till winter, and permitting him either to ship the regalia in a vessel sent to transfer them to Holland, or to retain them should he think the removal would dishearten the garrison.

The castle was surrendered on 26 May. The conditions were that the garrison should march out with the usual honours, and be permitted to pass to their homes unmolested. The favourable terms were granted in the hope of obtaining possession of the regalia; but as Ogilvy failed to deliver them up, he and Lady Ogilvy were detained prisoners in a room of the castle until 10 January 1653, only obtaining their liberty when all hope of obtaining possession of the regalia was dissipated by a false but circumstantial report that they had been carried abroad. Ogilvy was also required to find caution in £2,000 sterling.

== After the Restoration ==
The regalia remained in concealment at Kinneff until the Restoration, when they were delivered up by Ogilvy to Charles II. For his services in conjunction with their preservation, Ogilvy was by letters patent, 5 March 1660, created a baronet of Nova Scotia, and, 3 March 1666 received a charter of the lands of Barras, which was ratified by parliament on 17 August 1679.

There is no record of his death. He was buried at Kinneff, where there is a monument to him and his wife. He had a son, Sir William Ogilvy, who in 1701 published a pamphlet setting forth the special services of his father as preserver of the regalia, in contrast to those rendered by the Earl Marischal, the title being A True Account of the Preservation of the regalia of Scotland. The pamphlet, which was reprinted in Somers Tracts, gave rise at the instance of the Earl Marischal's brother Earl of Kintore, to an action before the privy council, which, on 8 July 1702, passed an act for burning the book at the cross of Edinburgh, and fined Ogilvy's son David, one of the defenders, in 1,200 pounds Scots.

== See also ==
- Ogilvie baronets

== Attribution ==
- This article incorporates text from a publication now in the public domain: "Ogilvy, George (fl.1634-1679)". Dictionary of National Biography. London: Smith, Elder & Co. 1885–1900.
