= Alexander Walker Ogilvie =

Canadian politician and businessman (1829–1902)

The Honourable Alexander Walker Ogilvie
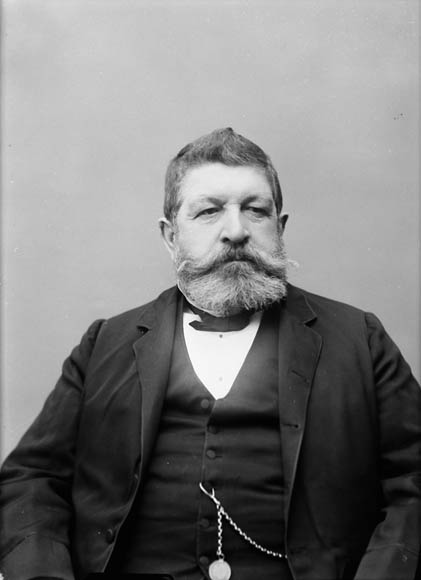

Senator for Alma, Quebec
- In office 1881–1901
- Appointed by: John A. Macdonald
- Preceded by: Edward Goff Penny
- Succeeded by: Robert Mackay

Member of the Legislative Assembly of Quebec for Montréal-Ouest
- In office 1867–1871
- Succeeded by: Francis Cassidy

Member of the Legislative Assembly of Quebec for Montréal-Centre
- In office 1875–1878
- Preceded by: Charles Alexander
- Succeeded by: Horatio Admiral Nelson

Personal details
- Born: May 7, 1829 Côte-Saint-Michel, Lower Canada
- Died: March 31, 1902 (aged 72) Montreal, Quebec, Canada
- Resting place: Mount Royal Cemetery
- Party: Conservative
- Occupation: Businessman, miller

Alexander Walker Ogilvie (May 7, 1829 – March 31, 1902) was a Canadian politician and businessman. He and his brothers, William and John, are remembered for their pioneering work in the Canadian milling trade with their company, A. W. Ogilvie & Co. of Montreal, and as pioneers and believers in the success of the Canadian West. Their company expanded to become the largest flour milling company in the British Empire.

He was born in Côte-Saint-Michel, Lower Canada (now Quebec) which is on the island of Montreal, the son of Alexander Ogilvie and Helen Watson. He attended the Howden and Taggart Academy in Montreal. His father and his uncle, James Goudie, operated a flour mill called Glenora Mills on the Lachine Canal. Alexander went into partnership with his uncle in 1852. When Goudie left the firm in 1855, Ogilvie went into partnership with his younger brother, John, forming A. W. Ogilvie & Company.

Their brother, William Watson Ogilvie, joined the company in 1860 to head up the Montreal offices. At this point Alexander was able to devote more time to politics.

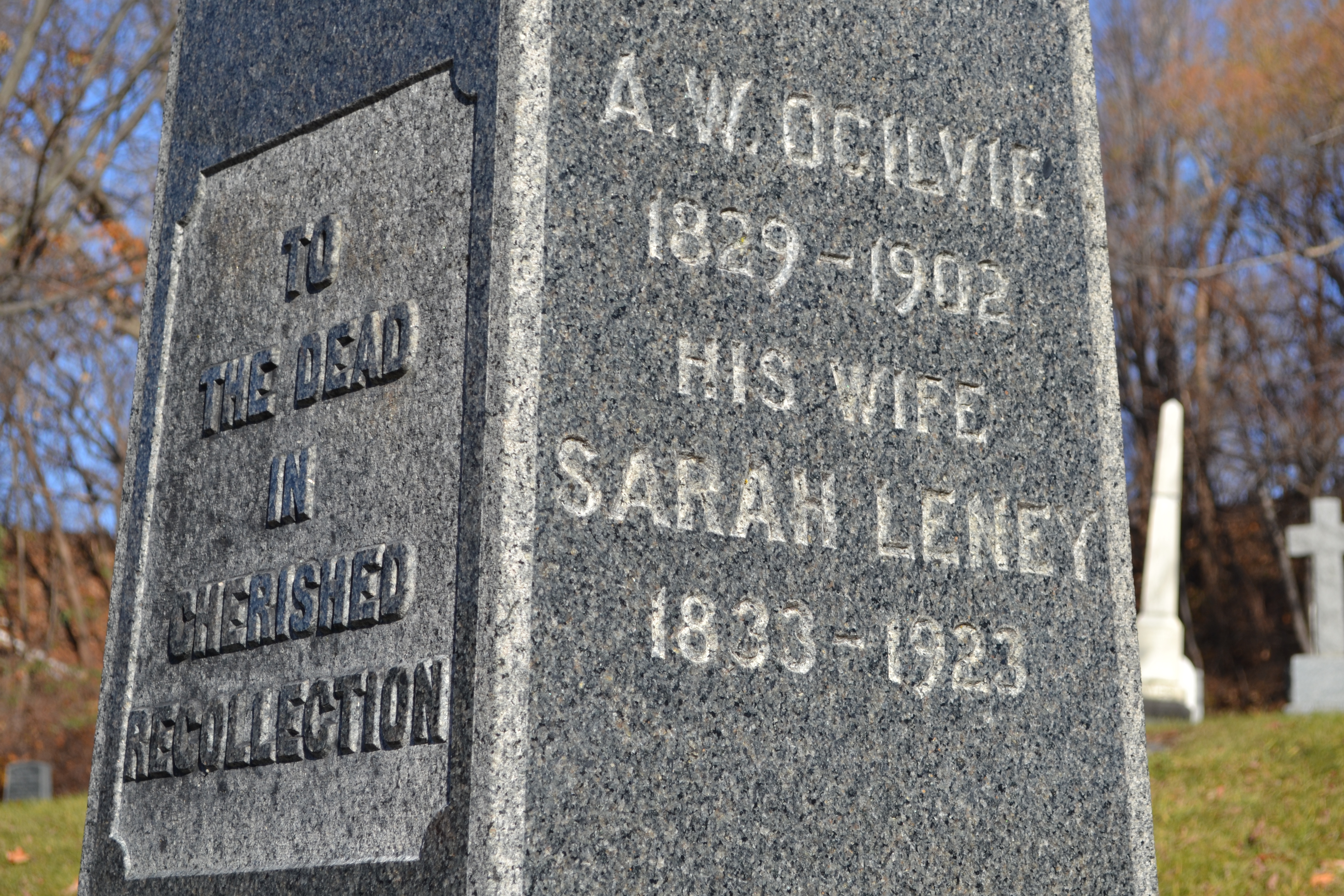
Detail of Ogilvie's funeral monument in Mount Royal Cemetery.

In the 1867 Quebec general election, he was acclaimed to the Legislative Assembly of Quebec for the riding of Montréal-Ouest. He did not run in the 1871 election. He left A. W. Ogilvie and Co in 1874. He was elected again in the 1875 election, this time in the riding of Montréal-Centre. He did not run in the 1878 election. In 1881, he was appointed to the Senate of Canada representing the senatorial division of Alma, Quebec. A Conservative, he resigned in 1901.

He was a Justice of the Peace and Lt. Col. of the Montreal Cavalry and a director of Mount Royal Cemetery. He supported organizations such as the Montreal Workingmen's Mutual Benefit and Widows and Orphans Provident Society, St. Andrew's Society.

Ogilvie died in 1902 and his remains were interred at Mount Royal Cemetery.
