= George Washington Stephens Sr. =

Canadian politician

George Washington Stephens
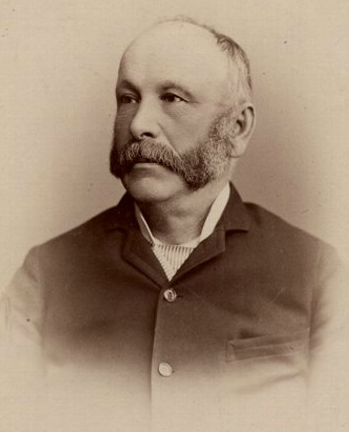

Member of the Legislative Assembly of Quebec for Montréal-Centre
- In office 1881–1886
- Preceded by: Horatio Admiral Nelson
- Succeeded by: James McShane

Member of the Legislative Assembly of Quebec for Huntingdon
- In office 1892–1900
- Preceded by: Alexander Cameron
- Succeeded by: William H. Walker

Personal details
- Born: 22 September 1832 Swanton, Vermont
- Died: 20 June 1904 (aged 71) near Saint-Alexis-des-Monts, Quebec
- Resting place: Mount Royal Cemetery
- Spouse(s): Elizabeth Mary McIntosh; Frances Ramsey McIntosh
- Children: George Washington Stephens Jr.
- Education: McGill College
- Occupation: businessman, politician
- Profession: lawyer

George Washington Stephens (22 September 1832 – 20 June 1904) was a Canadian businessman, lawyer, and politician.

== Biography ==
Born in Swanton, Vermont, the son of Harrison Stephens (1801–1881) and Sarah Jackson, his father was a wealthy Montreal merchant from Vermont who had moved to Montreal in the 1830s. Stephens was born at Swanton while his mother was on a visit there.

Stephens was one of the first boys to attend the newly established High School of Montreal. After leaving school, he worked in the retail hardware trade and with his brother in the family business, then in 1863 Stephens received a law degree from McGill College and was admitted to the Bar of Quebec. He started practicing law in a partnership but soon practiced alone.

=== Family ===
In 1865 he married the much younger Elizabeth Mary McIntosh, who was of Scottish origin. They had a son, George Washington Stephens Jr. (1866–1942). After the sudden and unexpected death of Elizabeth, Stephens married her younger sister, Frances Ramsey McIntosh, in 1878. They had a son together, Francis Chattan Stephens (1887–1918), who went to become a stockbroker and, during World War I, a Captain in the Canadian 13th Battalion. Chattan, as he was called, married a daughter of Canadian military minister Albert Edward Kemp in 1912. Their daughter, Frances Elizabeth (1912–2014) married Murray Gordon Ballantyne, son of Charles Colquhoun Ballantyne, politician.

=== Political career ===
In 1868, Stephens was elected to the Montreal City Council as a councillor for the Saint-Laurent ward. He served on the council from 1868 to 1879, 1881 to 1882, and from 1889 to 1892.

In 1881, he was elected as the Liberal candidate to the Legislative Assembly of Quebec for the electoral district of Montréal-Centre. He was defeated in the 1886 election and again in the 1890 election. He was elected again for Huntingdon in the 1892 and 1897 elections. He was appointed minister without portfolio in the cabinet of Premier Félix-Gabriel Marchand in 1897. He was re-appointed to the same office in the cabinet of Premier Simon-Napoléon Parent. He did not run in the 1900 election and was appointed a provincial commission on colonization in 1902.

== Death and family legacy ==
He died in Quebec on June 20, 1904 at the age of 71. He is interred in Montreal's Mount Royal Cemetery.

His son, George Washington Stephens, was also a politician in Quebec. His second wife, Frances, perished in the sinking of the British luxury liner RMS Lusitania in 1915. Her body was recovered and the coffin sent back to Canada on the Hesperian which was sunk by a torpedo allegedly by the same German submarine that had sunk the Lusitania.
