= Fred Ogilvie =

American politician and physician

Fred Lee Ogilvie

Member of the Missouri House of Representatives from the Scott County district
- In office 1923–1925

Personal details
- Born: March 3, 1887 Charleston, Missouri, US
- Died: October 14, 1946 (aged 59) Cape Girardeau, Missouri, US
- Party: Democratic
- Education: Baptist College in Farmington, Missouri; St. Louis University
- Occupation: doctor, bank president

Fred Lee Ogilvie (March 3, 1887 - October 14, 1946) was an American politician and physician from Blodgett, Missouri, who served in the Missouri House of Representatives. He was educated in the Charleston, Missouri, public schools. During World War I, Ogilvie served as a captain in the Medical Corps at Fort Riley and Camp Henry Knox. In 1931, while living in Caruthersville, Missouri, he was the medical director in charge of the malarial control campaign.
