= John Ogilvy =

John Ogilvy may refer to:

- John Ogilvy, spy of William Cecil, 2nd Earl of Exeter and James VI
- Sir John Ogilvy, 9th Baronet, MP for Dundee

== See also ==
- John Ogilvy-Grant, 7th Earl of Seafield, Scottish nobleman
- John Ogilvie (disambiguation)
- John Ogilby – Scottish translator, impresario and cartographer (1600–1676)
