= Ogilvie baronets =

Baronetcy in the Baronetage of Nova Scotia

The Ogilvie baronetcy of Barras, Kincardine, Scotland was created in the Baronetage of Nova Scotia on 5 March 1662 for George Ogilvie for his defence of Dunnottar Castle against Cromwell and the preservation of the regalia of Scotland in 1651–1652.

== Ogilvie baronets of Barras (1662) ==
- Sir George Ogilvie, 1st Baronet (died c.1680)
- Sir William Ogilvie, 2nd Baronet (died c.1707)
- Sir David Ogilvie, 3rd Baronet (died c.1740)
- Sir William Ogilvie, 4th Baronet (died 1791)
- Sir David Ogilvie, 5th Baronet (1729–1799)
- Sir George Mulgrave Ogilvie, 6th Baronet (1779–1837)
- Sir William Ogilvie, 7th Baronet (c.1785–c.1840) (Baronetcy dormant on his death)

== See also ==
- Ogilvy baronets
- Ogilvy-Wedderburn baronets
