= John Ogilvie (South African cricketer) =

South African cricketer (born 1958)

Personal information
- Full name: John Derek Ogilvie
- Born: 14 July 1958 (age 68); Stutterheim, South Africa
- Source: Cricinfo, 12 December 2020

John Ogilvie (born 14 July 1958) is a South African former cricketer. He played in 39 first-class and 15 List A matches from 1976/77 to 1989/90.
