= Charles Ogilvie (sailor) =

Jamaican sailor

Charles Mark Ogilvie
Personal information
- Nationality: Jamaican
- Born: 18 December 1942

Sport
- Sport: Sailing

Charles Ogilvie (born 18 December 1942, date of death unknown) was a Jamaican sailor. He competed in the Dragon event at the 1968 Summer Olympics.
