= Will Ogilvie (painter) =

Canadian painter

Will Ogilvie MBE CM RCA
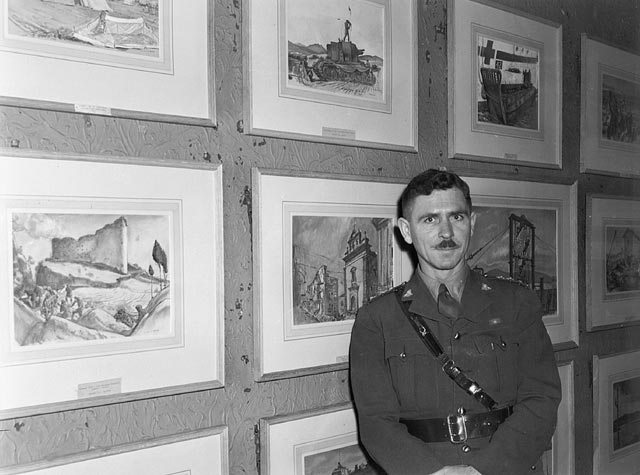
- Capt. Will Ogilvie, first Official army war artist, with some of his paintings, 9 February 1944
- Born: William Abernethy Ogilvie; March 30, 1901; Stutterheim, South Africa
- Died: August 28, 1989 (aged 88); Toronto, Ontario, Canada
- Education: Art Students League of New York in Johannesburg, Ogilvie studied with Erich Mayer
- Military career
- Allegiance: United Kingdom
- Branch: Canadian Army
- Service years: 1942-1945
- Rank: Captain
- Unit: 1st Canadian Division
- Conflicts: World War II

William Abernethy Ogilvie, MBE CM RCA (March 3, 1901 – August 28, 1989) was a Canadian painter and Official Second World War artist.

== Early life ==
Ogilvie came to Canada in 1925 and after living in Toronto, went to New York from 1925–1930 to study at the Art Students League with Kimon Nicolaïdes, the author later of an important text on drawing, The Natural Way to Draw (1941). He worked briefly in New York as a commercial artist before returning to Toronto and joining Charles Comfort and Harold Ayres in a company which offered diverse skills, part advertising, part magazine illustration. In 1933, he was one of the founders of the Canadian Group of Painters and from 1933–1989, he was also a member of the Canadian Society of Painters in Water Colour. In 1936, he did murals for the Chapel of Hart House, University of Toronto.

== War artist ==
After working at the Art Association of Montreal, Ogilvie joined the Canadian army in 1940 and was commissioned as the first Official War artist in 1942. Attached to the 1st Canadian Division, he made the first significant art work in an active theatre of war, nearly always under fire. From 1943 on, he was in Sicily, mainland Italy and Northwest Europe. His paintings of the ruined buildings at Caen in Normandy, the Falaise Gap, and refugees are memorable.

== Later career ==
After the war, Ogilvie taught at the Ontario College of Art (1947–1957) and as special lecturer at the department of fine art at the University of Toronto (1960–1969). His work has been widely exhibited and collected, most notably by the Canadian War Museum. He lived for the latter part of his life in Palgrave, Ontario.

== Honours ==
For his work as a war artist, he was awarded the M.B.E. (Military). In 1979, he was made a member of the Order of Canada as well as a member of the Royal Canadian Academy of Arts.

== See also ==
- Canadian official war artists
- War art

== Bibliography ==
- MacDonald, Colin (1977). A Dictionary of Canadian Artists (First ed.). Ottawa: Canadian Paperbacks Publishing. ISBN 0919554113.
- Will Ogilvie fonds at Library and Archives Canada
