= John Ogilvie (miller) =

Canadian businessman and miller

John Ogilvie

John Ogilvie (1833–1888), and his brothers, Alexander Walker Ogilvie and William Watson Ogilvie took over their father Alexander's flour business in 1856 and expanded it into what would subsequently become the largest millers and exporters in the British Empire. The brothers played a historic role in Canada's agricultural and industrial development.

== Early years ==
Ogilvie was born at the family farmhouse at Côte-Saint-Michel, Lower Canada (now Quebec) on January 8, 1833, the second son of Alexander Ogilvie and Helen Watson. He received his early education from Mr. Gibson, a Scotsman employed by the English speaking residents of the district to teach their children. He attended high school in Montreal. He lived with his parents working on their farm until April 1855 when he moved to Montreal.

== Business career ==
=== A.W. Oglivie & Co. ===
In Montreal, Ogilvie became the first partner of his elder brother Alexander with A. W. Ogilvie & Co., millers and grain dealers, opening their first mill in 1856. The third brother, William Watson, joined them in 1860. Alexander left the company in 1874 to pursue a political career as an MLA in Quebec and later as a senator in Ottawa. William and John administered the company following Alexander's departure as it became Canada's largest flour miller and exporter.

Initially, the firm had only one mill, "Glenora", in Montreal but during the following years expanded its operations to mills in Ontario at Goderich and Seaforth. John, despite objections from those who questioned his sanity in investing in the unsettled West, was one of the few to see the potential of Canadian prairie wheat. The company purchased several thousand acres of prairie land and built numerous wheat elevators and the extensive Winnipeg flour mills. John was in charge of construction and during the last years of his life spent almost half his time in Ontario and Manitoba managing the company's expansion. He had a reputation as a shrewd and successful businessman. When Alexander retired from the family business in 1874, John became head of the firm until his death in 1888.

=== Public service ===
Unlike his brothers, he shied away from public life. He was a Justice of the Peace for the District of Montreal and as a young man was in the Montreal troop of cavalry commanded by his brother, Alexander. He was one of the earliest life members of the St. Andrew's Society. He was a governor of the Montreal General Hospital and a member of the American Presbyterian Church on Dorchester (now Rene Levesque) Blvd.

== Marriage and family life ==
On April 28, 1863, he married Margaret Watson (1839–1915), whose father, Thomas Watson, of Brown & Watson, contractors, was involved in the construction of the Victoria Bridge and the Lachine Canal. They had 9 children of whom 8 survived to adulthood.

John Ogilvie's health suffered in 1868 when he was thrown from a horse and dragged along the road causing severe injuries. He visited specialists in Britain who did not think he would live much longer. He was unable to exercise as a result of these accidents and suffered from heart problems in his later years. In the hope of restoring his health, he and his wife visited New Mexico, California, and Vancouver in the spring of 1888. He died on July 23, 1888, of heart disease, and is buried in Mount Royal Cemetery.

On the day of his death at a meeting of the Montreal Corn Exchange Association, Mr Edgar Judge paid the following tribute:

Mr. President, I think we must all feel that in the death of Mr. John Ogilvie, this association has sustained a not common loss. He was one of our oldest and best known members. His life was a striking example of the fact that energy and enterprise, coupled with good judgement and patient industry, will almost certainly secure an adequate reward. We have seen the firm with which he was connected grow from small beginnings until it has become one of the largest and most important in the Dominion, and we all know that he contributed his full share to the development of its immense business. He was often approached by those who wished this association to confer on him the highest office in its gift, but he invariably declined to have his name brought forward. He was content to serve the association on its committee and on the board of examiners, where his opinions were always listened to with the respect they deserved. He was a staunch friend, a wise counsellor, a kindly and genial confrere, and I feel that his death is a serious loss not only to the association, but to the Dominion at large.
