= William Ogilvie of Pittensear =

Scottish classicist, numismatist and author on land reform

William Ogilvie of Pittensear FRSE FSA (Scot) (1736–14 February 1819), known as the Rebel Professor and described by his biographer as the "Euclid of Land law Reform", was a Scottish classicist, numismatist and author of an influential historic land reform treatise. Published in London in 1781, An Essay on the Right of Property in Land was issued anonymously, necessarily it seems in a revolutionary age.

As with John Locke, John Stuart Mill, Thomas Paine, Adam Smith and others—Ogilvie is seen as a leading proto-Georgist thinker. His masterwork was republished in 1838, then in 1891 (reprinted 1970) as the heart and subject of a much larger new work titled Birthright in Land, and in more recent years has been republished twice in modern, further expanded editions, using that same title. Ogilvie is cited as an influence by reformers internationally.

The principal authority and main published source of information on William Ogilvie and his life is his 19th-century biographer DC MacDonald, who says:

The facts known about Ogilvie's life are exceedingly scanty, and would of themselves be of little importance; but when considered along with the conception we form of the man as displayed on every page of his book, the smallest scrap of authentic information will in these days be of some interest, not only to "men of enlarged and inquisitive minds", but also to readers in general. It is in the book, however, and in the book alone, that we meet face to face with the author. Ogilvie instilled his soul into it, and he left us evidence that it was the chief aim of his life. We, therefore, should as soon think of separating the man Isaiah from the Book of Isaiah, as we should of separating the man Ogilvie from the book of Ogilvie.

== Life ==
Born in 1736, William Ogilvie was the only son of James Ogilvie of Pittensear, Morayshire, and of Marjory Steuart of Tannachy in the neighbouring county of Banff. "A born and bred patrician", he was lineally descended from Gillecrist, the last Maor Mor of Angus, one of the seven provinces of Pictish Scotland. "By birth and lineage an anti-Whig, and, as a man, he must have despised the wirepulling Scotch Whigs of his time as 'but a pack o' traitor louns'".

There is no authentic account of Ogilvie's boyhood, according to his biographer, who assumes that until he left home for college he was brought up in the diminutive mansion-house of Pittensear and attended the Grammar School in Elgin, the county town and cathedral city five miles (8 km) away. One dramatic incident in his childhood may have been defining:

When the so-called Royal Army was passing through Morayshire in 1746 'Butcher' Cumberland's government troops on their way to the Battle of Culloden, a short halt was made at Pittensear House, and three cannon shots were fired at it. One of these shots struck the front wall close to the dining-room window, and, we need not say, caused the inmates much alarm. William Ogilvie, then about ten years of age, in all probability witnessed that scene—a sad example of what even a Whig Government may do at the head of a mercenary army. He, without any doubt, surveyed the wreck after the storm had passed. We have it on the authority of old people still living near Pittensear, that his mother, who happened to be in childbed at the time, never recovered the shock of that day's proceedings, and that shortly thereafter she was laid in a premature grave. And a few years later, when his disconsolate and broken-hearted father had quitted life's stage, he was left alone, in place of both father and mother, as guardian to four orphan girls. Here we may trace the way in which, what we may call a motherly feeling towards all the children of men, was developed in his breast.

In 1755, at the age of nineteen, Ogilvie entered King's College, Aberdeen. On graduating in 1759 he was appointed Master of the Grammar School at Cullen, Morayshire—remaining there a year. He then attended Glasgow University in the winter session of 1760–61 and Edinburgh University the following winter. While he was at Glasgow, studying under Dr. Joseph Black, the engineer inventor James Watt was demonstrating his scientific discoveries at the university and Adam Smith occupied the chair of moral philosophy.

MacDonald says that between 1759 and 1762 Ogilvie was travelling tutor and companion to Alexander, 4th Duke of Gordon—"during which time he probably found himself in the company of Adam Smith as travelling tutor and companion to Henry Scott, 3rd Duke of Buccleuch." But Ritchie points out that the period of travel "coincided with the commencement of Ogilvie's teaching duties and [Gordon] is known to have taken another tutor" Ogilvie on 'Grand Tour' would have had good opportunity to survey the broad continent of Europe and witness the condition of its people: his reformer eye would not have missed those circumstances and conditions that were to lead to the French Revolution:

The widow is gathering nettles for her children's dinner; a perfumed seigneur, delicately lounging in the Œil de Bœuf, hath an alchemy whereby he will extract from her the third nettle, and call it rent.

In 1761 Ogilvie was appointed Assistant Professor of Philosophy in King's College, Aberdeen, and Regent in 1764. The following year he exchanged offices with the Professor of Humanity, which class he taught until he retired in 1817. Ogilvie appears to have lived a somewhat reclusive life, remaining unmarried and childless. He is buried in the south transept of St Machar's Cathedral in Old Aberdeen, adjacent to his college: a discreet stone in the wall describes him as "William Ogilvie, Esquire of Pittensear, in the County of Moray, and Professor of Humanity in the University and King's College, Aberdeen, who died on the 14th February 1819, aged 83 years". His Times obituary called him "one of the most accomplished scholars of the age".

== The Book of Ogilvie—Birthright in Land ==
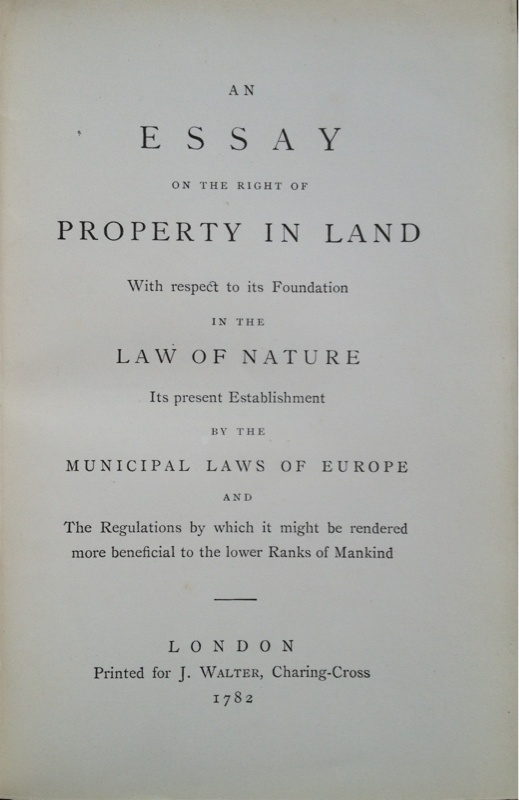

The declared object of An Essay on the Right of Property in Land, according to its original title and introduction, is to show how "property in land might be rendered more beneficial to the lower ranks of mankind". Due to what MacDonald calls the 'boycotting' of Ogilvie and his masterwork by the establishment, "the lower ranks of mankind in England, Scotland, Wales, Ireland, and the British Colonies never heard that such a man lived, far less that he left them such a legacy". In his preface to the 1891 edition of Ogilvie's book, DC MacDonald elucidates Ogilvie's core message:

When a child is born, we recognise that it has a natural right to its mother's milk, and no one can deny that it has the same right to mother-earth. It is really its mother-earth, plus the dew and sunshine from heaven and a little labour, that supplies the milk and everything else required for its subsistence. The monster that would deprive a babe of its mother's milk, or would monopolise the breasts of several mothers, to the exclusion of several children, is not more deserving of being destroyed than the monster who seizes absolute possession of more than his share of the common mother of mankind, to the exclusion of his fellow-creatures.

In his Essay Ogilvie claims the birthright of every citizen to an equal share in the value of property in land, and outlines the practical policy means by which this would progressively be achieved. He asserts "land values as having three parts, the original, the improved, and the improvable values; the first and third of these [belong] to the community and only the second to the landholder". Fillebrown provides a considered critical analysis of Ogilvie's proposal: "The crux of the land problem, according to Ogilvie's analysis, lies in the reconciliation" of the conflict between "the claims to an equal share of land, involving right of occupancy, and the claim to more than an equal share, based on labour.... 'Rude nations have adhered to the first of these maxims, neglecting the second. Nations advanced in industry and arts have adhered to the second, neglecting the first.'"

To establish a just combination of these two maxims, at the original foundation of states, so as to render it a fundamental part of their frame and constitution, or to introduce it afterwards, with as little violence as may be, to the actual possessions and supposed rights and interests of various orders of men, ought to be the object of all agrarian laws; and this object being once distinctly conceived, if wise and benevolent men will turn their attention towards it, no doubt need be entertained that very practicable methods of carrying it into execution will in time be discovered, by comparison of projects, or from the result of trials.

Ogilvie set out a prototype of the economic policy known as land value taxation, or, as his modern editors style it, community ground rent. However his analysis and proposal are incomplete, says Fillebrown:

"His enumeration of the moral benefits to accrue to mankind from a realisation of his fiscal ideal is a brilliant prognostication that no later and greater economic light has sufficed to dim. But Ogilvie's failure to grasp the full significance of economic rent, especially urban rent, as a social product, and the stress laid by him on his proposed agrarian law, a plan devoted to a now admittedly impossible mechanical allotment of land; are responsible for his being relegated from the Authorities to the Appendix [ie. by Fillebrown from the body of his book to its appendix].

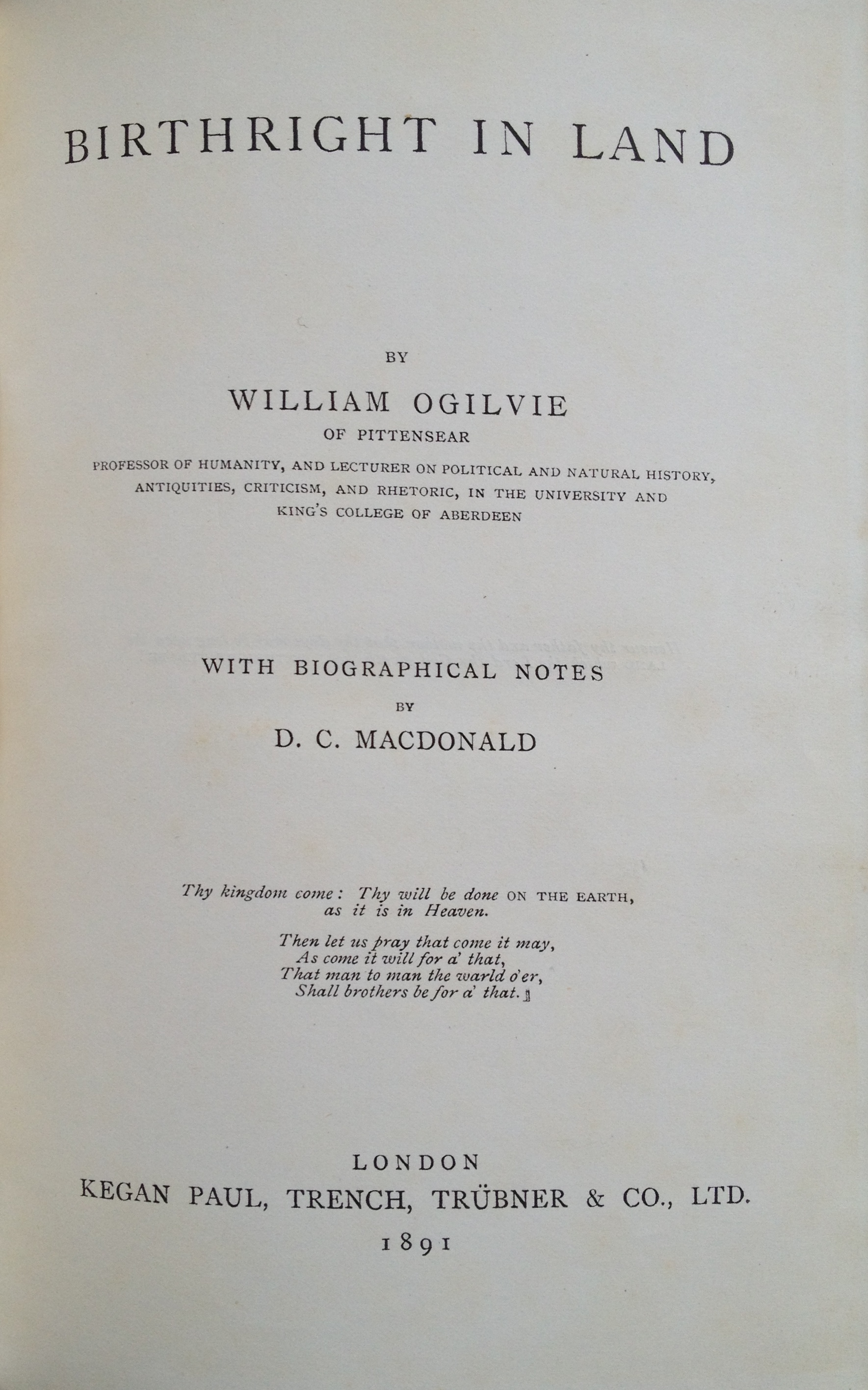

MacDonald describes Ogilvie's Essay as "a pastoral prose poem, through which we can realise this beautiful world, with its ample provision for satisfying man's instinctive and rational faculties of enjoyment." Ogilvie wrote his revolutionary masterwork between 1776 (the US declaration of independence) and 1781—eight years before the storming of the Bastille. He presented the work as a warning to the "friends of mankind", he being "well aware that great changes suddenly accomplished are always pregnant with danger".

Despite his so-called 'boycotting', Ogilvie and his work does appear to have had contemporary influence. A copy of his Essay, marked "with the author's compliments", was found in the repositories of the modernising Frederick the Great; and Ogilvie was involved in the land tenure reforms carried out by Lord Cornwallis in lower Bengal in 1793.

Ogilvie's work was praised by Fillebrown as "a notable contribution to economic literature, a product of original and independent thinking". The ideas it contains were to be taken up and developed a hundred years later by the American social reformer Henry George and definitively presented in own masterpiece, the economics best-seller Progress and Poverty. Thus would Ogilvie's Enlightenment insights be turned into a significant 19th century social and political movement, and become a philosophy that would in turn inspire and inform the modern land reform. and Green movements.

MacDonald delivers a closing paean on Ogilvie's work:

His Essay on the Right of Property in Land, in every line of it, says: suffer little children to come unto me, and I shall teach them that God is no respecter of persons; that all the children of men are entitled indiscriminately to an equal share in the soil, in all wild animals, game, fish, and the whole products of nature, necessary for man's subsistence or enjoyment; and that anything contrary to this doctrine is a gross and blasphemous slander on the Creator, as well as a most iniquitous fraud on the bulk of mankind.

== Friend of Robert Burns ==
Ogilvie's biographer makes a sustained and compelling argument—presenting circumstantial but no concrete evidence—that Ogilvie was personally acquainted with his compatriot Robert Burns. He appealingly places the two men side by side:

Both were lovers of mankind, and there was a very strong mental affinity between them. Ogilvie was known as "the gentleman an' scholar", but never (except within a very limited circle) as a Land Law Reformer. This is a regretful circumstance. It is equally regretful that Burns is more known as "a rhyming, ranting, roving billie" than as a pioneer and great thinker, in regard to reforms for the benefit of mankind…. Ogilvie and Burns saw eye to eye; but while Burns roused up his fellow-men from the gutter of serfdom, Ogilvie reasoned with them as to the causes which brought them to such a low condition, and also as to the means of reclaiming their natural rights. Ogilvie considered the whole question from a magnanimous, impartial, and truly scientific point of view. He pleaded for "free inquiry"; he sought after truth; he was not one of those rough-and-ready reformers who would simply say, "Abolish landlordism and all evils will vanish". No. He looked upon modern landlordism not as a cause but as an effect. The primary and fundamental cause of all the evils under which humanity suffers is traced by him to man's want of knowledge; and landlordism, with all its consequent evils, under which humanity groans, according to him, is directly owing to man's ignorance of his natural rights. It is this ignorance which begets slavish submission and breeds oppression. Ogilvie considered the situation logically. In his view ignorant humanity must neglect its rights, and without its rights cannot perform its duties. Rights and duties are co-relative. Ogilvie recognised this very old maxim of Natural Law.

== Landowner ==
Ogilvie came from a family of agricultural improvers. A gentleman farmer and landlord, he managed in-hand a good portion of his inherited lands of Pittensear until 1772, when, apparently for family reasons, he sold the property to the Earl of Fife (reserving a lease on the mansion house and manor farm, which he retained "to the last parting pang").

In 1773 Ogilvie purchased the property of Oldfold and Stonegavel, on Deeside, about six miles (10 km) outside Aberdeen. In 1808, after thirty-five years of agricultural improvement, having borrowed £2000 from the Duke of Gordon for draining, trenching, blasting and legal fees, he sold it again.

"In the year 1802 we find him carrying through a Process in the Court of Teinds, by which he saved the property from being plundered by increased tithes on the increased value arising from his improvements. He got the tithes valued according to the old rental."

Although an academic intellectual, Ogilvie appears to have been a practical man: his management of his landed property benefited from his profound theoretical insights; while his theoretical knowledge was bolstered by his hands-on practical experience on the land.

== Antiquarian and collector ==
Ritchie says "Ogilvie enthralled his students with the outstanding quality of his translations of classical writers, especially Virgil and Horace, although these were never published", and that "his scholarship extended to natural history and the fine arts". Ogilvie was a keen antiquary, medallist, numismatist and collector—of natural specimens and of rare prints, mainly portraits. Commencing around 1772, Professor Ogilvie began

of his own accord to put together a collection of specimens for a museum of natural history in the King's College, and has now fitted up, and furnished three apartments for their accommodation. [He procured]...an assortment of specimens of fossils, and in the various branches of zoology as might serve to excite the liberal curiosity of youth, and make them, in some measure, acquainted the immense variety of the works of nature.... One is astonished to find so large a collection of birds, fishes, marbles, spars etc., accumulated in so short a space.

His collection developed into the Aberdeen University Zoology Museum, one of the oldest in the country.

== Educational reformer ==
During his tenure at Aberdeen Ogilvie was an active educational reformer, helping to sweep aside "a gavelkind system of distributing University honours". "Ogilvie's clarity of thought, freedom from preconceptions, and disinterested motives inevitably brought him into conflict with colleagues in King's College". Professor Ogilvie held the modern view that Universities were public institutions, and professors public servants (with regard to teaching) and trustees for the public (with regard to endowments, buildings, libraries, etc). The 18th century Masters of King's College collectively were of a different view.

MacDonald records that during Ogilvie's time as a member of King's College

his colleagues not only alienated some of the lands belonging to the college, but they misapplied and 'misappropriated' College funds. They also disposed of the patronage of no less than fifteen churches, and, worse still, the right of presentation to twenty bursaries. The great landlords were the purchasers of these saleable commodities, and in this way they became the private owners of rights and duties which, until then, were held by the Professors in trust for the public. The money received for Church patronage has been accounted for, but the price of the other articles of commerce was appropriated by the Masters as their own private property. It became 'money in their purse'.

Ogilvie protested and sought reform:

For upwards of half-a-century Prof. Ogilvie was perhaps the most energetic member of Senatus, his decidedly progressive views bringing him not infrequently into conflict with his more conservative colleagues. The pages of the College Minutes during his incumbency bristle with protests against, and reasons of dissent from, the decision of the majority.

A contemporary printed paper titled 'Outlines of a Plan for Uniting the King's and Marischal Universities of Aberdeen, With a View to Render the System of Education More Complete' is believed to have been authored by Ogilvie. Its reform proposals were rejected by his own College, with seven out of Ogilvie's ten Professor colleagues opposing it—the "seven wise Masters" as they became known. It was not until 1860 finally that the 1786 plans were implemented.

In 1764, Ogilvie's name was connected with a scheme for a Public Library in Aberdeen. This, like much of his work educational reform, was another large public project that would remain unrealized in his lifetime, but has since been achieved. His greatest proposition for the public good—the equitable sharing of nature's bounty among all citizens—remains unfulfilled.
