= John Ogilvie (New Zealand cricketer) =

New Zealand cricketer (born 1969)

Personal information
- Full name: John David Ogilvie
- Born: 3 December 1969 (age 56); Motueka, New Zealand
- Batting: Right-handed

Domestic team information
- Years: Team
- 1989/90–1997/98: Nelson
- 1994/95–1995/96: Central Districts
- Source: Cricinfo, 29 October 2020

John Ogilvie (born 3 December 1969) is a New Zealand cricketer. He played in ten List A matches for Central Districts between the 1994–95 and to 1995–96 seasons.

Born and raised in the Tasman region, Ogilvie played his club cricket for Wakatu Cricket Club. After playing club Rugby for Huia, he made his provincial debut for Nelson Rugby in 1987.
