= Charles Atmore Ogilvie =

British clergyman

Charles Atmore Ogilvie (1793–1873) was a Church of England clergyman.

== Life ==
Ogilvie, son of John Ogilvie of Whitehaven, Cumberland, who died at Duloe, Cornwall, 25 April 1839, by his wife Catharine Curwen of the Isle of Man, was born at Whitehaven 20 Nov. 1793, and matriculated from Balliol College, Oxford, on 27 November 1811. After taking a first class in 1815, he won the chancellor's prize for the English essay in 1817. He graduated B.A. 1815, M.A. 1818, B.D. and D.D. 1842. In 1816 he was elected a fellow of his college, and took holy orders. He was tutor 1819–30, bursar 1822, and senior dean 1842. He was appointed a university examiner in 1823 and 1824, and examiner in the classical school in 1825. He greatly assisted Richard Jenkyns, the master of Balliol, in improving the tone and discipline of the college, and contributed largely to giving it a foremost place in the university. About 1829 he was looked on as a leader of the high-church party in Oxford, but he gave little active support to the Oxford Movement. He was a select preacher before the university in 1825, 1832, and 1844, and was made Bampton lecturer in 1836.

Ogilvie held some clerical preferment while still fellow and tutor of Balliol. He was rector of Wickford, Essex, from 4 January 1822 to 1833; rector of Abbotsley, Huntingdonshire, from 30 Aug. 1822 to 1839; and vicar of Duloe from 20 October 1833 to 1840. The rectory and vicarage of Ross, Herefordshire, conferred on him 6 Dec. 1839, he held till his death. For a time he acted as domestic and examining chaplain to Archbishop Howley. He resigned his fellowship in 1834. Ogilvie became the first Regius Professor of Pastoral Theology on 23 April 1842, and as professor he succeeded in 1849 to a canonry at Christ Church, under the provisions of the Act 3 and 4 Vict. c. 113. Through life he maintained a close friendship with Martin Joseph Routh, president of Magdalen College, with whom he corresponded on literary subjects from 1847 to 1854. He was also very intimate with Joseph Blanco White. While lecturing on 15 Feb. 1873 he was seized with paralysis, and died in his house at Christ Church, Oxford, two days later. He was buried in the Latin Chapel in Christ Church Cathedral. By his marriage, on 18 April 1838, to Mary Ann Gurnell, daughter of Major Armstrong (who died 2 Oct. 1875), he had two daughters.

== Publications ==
1. "On the Union of Classical and Mathematical Studies,"’ printed in the Oxford English Prize Essays, vol. iii. 1836.
2. The Apostolic Origin of the Three Orders of the Christian Ministry, 1836.
3. The Divine Glory manifested in the Conduct and Discourses of our Lord. Eight Sermons before the University at the Lecture founded by J. Bampton, 1836.
4. Considerations on Subscription to the Thirty-nine Articles, 1845.
5. On Subscription to the Thirty-nine Articles as by Law required of Candidates for Holy Orders and of the Clergy, 1863.
