= Charles Ogilvie (footballer) =

Scottish footballer

Personal information
- Full name: Charles Scott Ogilvie
- Date of birth: 19 December 1884
- Place of birth: Eastwood, Scotland
- Date of death: 1939 (aged 54–55)
- Place of death: Montreal, Quebec, Canada
- Position: Outside left

Senior career*
Years	Team	Apps	(Gls)
1907	Queen's Park	1	(0)
- * Club domestic league appearances and goals

Charles Scott Ogilvie (19 December 1884 – 1939) was a Scottish amateur footballer who played as an outside left in the Scottish League for Queen's Park.

== Personal life ==
Ogilvie emigrated to Canada in October 1912 and worked as a civil engineer. After Canada's entry into the First World War in August 1914, Ogilvie joined the Canadian Expeditionary Force and became a corporal in a Canadian Highlander battalion.

== Career statistics ==
Appearances and goals by club, season and competition
Club	Season	League			Scottish Cup		Total	
Club	Season	Division	Apps	Goals	Apps	Goals	Apps	Goals
Queen's Park	1906–07	Scottish First Division	1	0	0	0	1	0
Career total			1	0	0	0	1	0
