= William Watson Ogilvie =

Canadian businessman (1835–1900)

W.W. Ogilvie
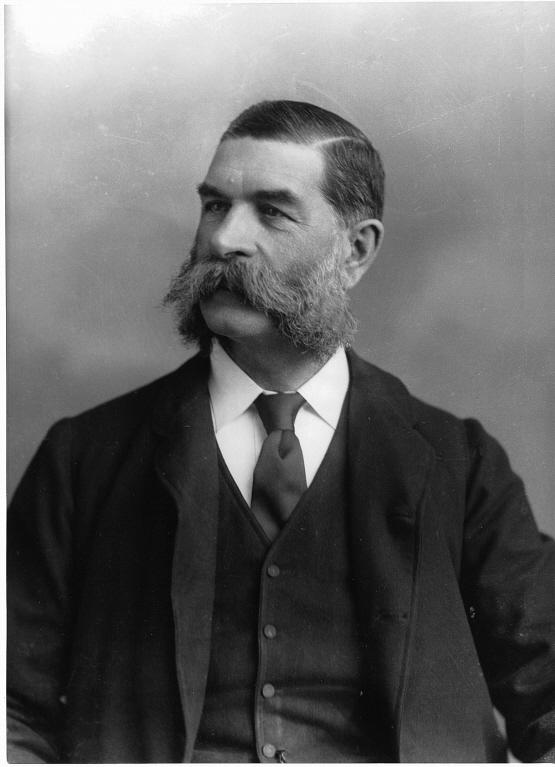
- Born: 15 February 1835; Montreal, Quebec
- Died: 12 January 1900 (aged 64); Montreal, Quebec

Captain William Watson Ogilvie (15 February 1835 – 12 January 1900) commanded a division of the Royal Montreal Cavalry during the Fenian Raids. He and his two brothers, Alexander and John, are remembered for their pioneering work in the Canadian milling trade and as pioneers and believers in the success of the Canadian West.

== Early years ==
William Watson Ogilvie was born at his father's farm at Cote St. Michel, near Montreal. He was the third son of Alexander Ogilvie (1779–1858), founder of the Ogilvie Flour Mills, and his wife Helen (1793–1863), daughter of John Watson, a businessman engaged in the flour industry at Montreal, and Helen Walker. The Ogilvies and the Watsons had known one another in Scotland. William's grandfather, Archibald Ogilvie (1750–1820), had been a prosperous farmer at Arnieve, near Gargunnock on the River Forth, but seeing little future for his children in Scotland sold his farms and with £2,000 took his family to Quebec. Arriving there in 1800, he purchased a large property at Howick on the Châteauguay River. William was educated privately at the High School of Montreal and afterwards served an apprenticeship in the family's milling business. Like his two brothers, he joined the Royal Montreal Cavalry in 1857. By 1866, he had assumed command of the regiment and defended Canada in the Fenian Raids.

== Ogilvie Flour Mills ==
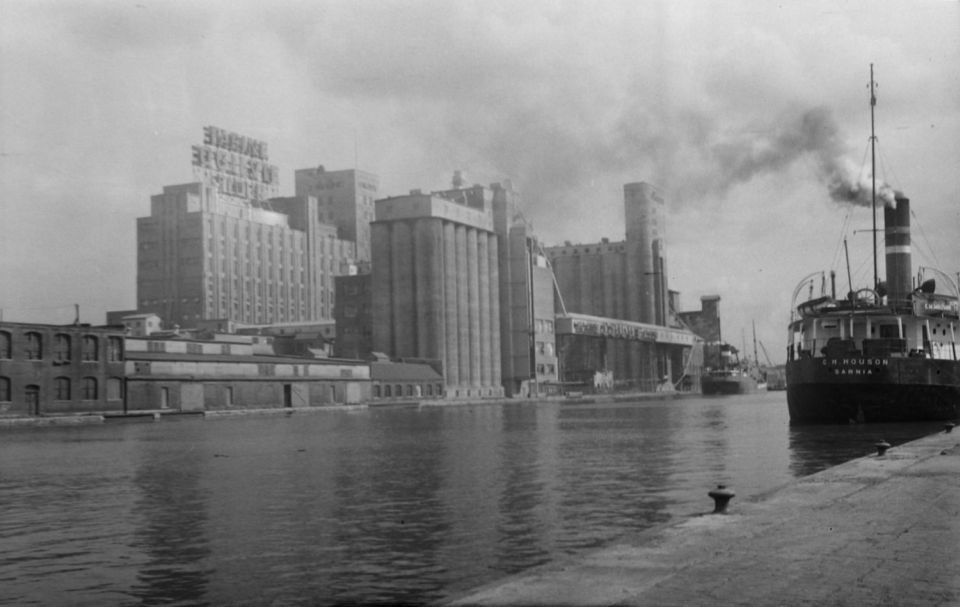
Ogilvie Flour Mills on the Lachine Canal in 1948

His brother expanded the family's flour mills and renamed the firm A. W. Ogilvie & Co., of Montreal. William joined his brothers, Alex and John, as a partner in May 1860. In 1868, William, accompanied by his brother Alexander Walker Ogilvie, travelled to Hungary to inspect the latest milling processes and adopted them into their own mills to produce a superior grade of flour. By 1872, the company was expanding into Ontario. When Alex entered politics, William succeeded him in running the firm from Montreal. The Ogilvies shipped their first load of wheat from Manitoba in 1877 and for the next decade dominated the grain trade of western Canada, which was experiencing an agricultural boom. They built a mill at Winnipeg in 1882.

They made an agreement with William Cornelius Van Horne and formed a monopoly with the Canadian Pacific Railway in exporting grain from Manitoba. By 1884 alone, this brought them a profit of $50,000. Manitoban producers complained, but the Ogilvies' monopoly continued with the growth of the Canadian West. A worker at their Montreal mill recalled William Ogilvie: "He was a fine figure of a man, tall, with a keen face and impressive sideburns, the very cut of a cavalry officer. He led his millers a merry life – always hiring, discharging and re-hiring them." Ogilvie assumed total control of the company after his brother John died in 1888. By the turn of the century, he had made the firm the largest milling company in the Dominion, with a worldwide reputation for producing high-quality flour.

Ogilvie was the president of the Montreal Board of Trade in 1893 and 1894, and a member of its council for six years. He was also a director of the Bank of Montreal, the Montreal Transportation Company, the North British and Mercantile Insurance Company, and a founding director of the Royal Trust Company. A generous philanthropist, he supported numerous charities and institutions across Canada including McGill University and the Winnipeg General Hospital. In politics, he was a member of the Conservative party. He campaigned for his brother Alexander Walker's appointment to the Senate in 1881, noting in a letter to Prime Minister Sir John A. Macdonald the past loyalty of the Ogilvie family to the party. He made substantial contributions at election time and favoured Macdonald's National Policy.

== Family and private life ==
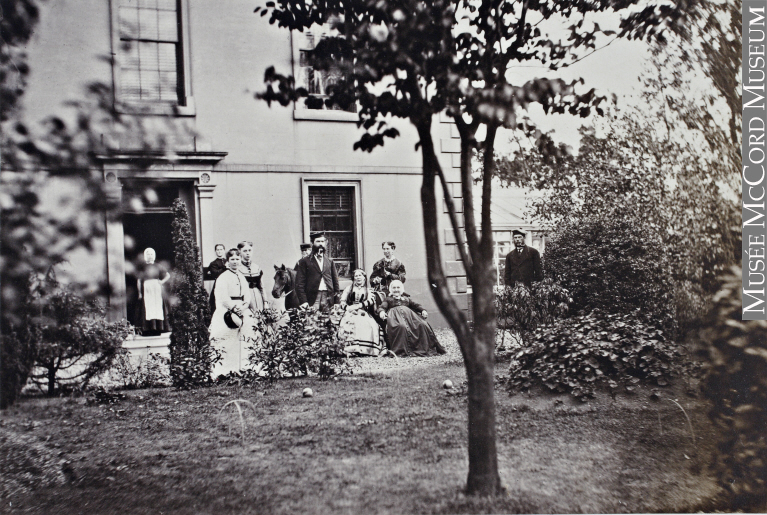
Members of the Johnston and Ogilvie families at Beauchamps House near Paisley, Scotland, c. 1868

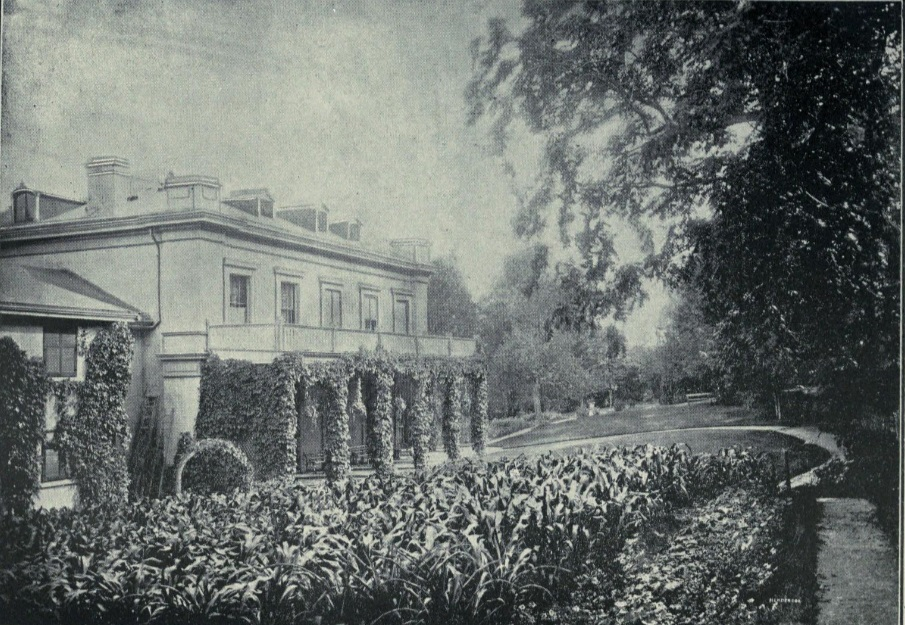
Rear view of Rosemount House in Montreal, purchased by Ogilvie in 1872

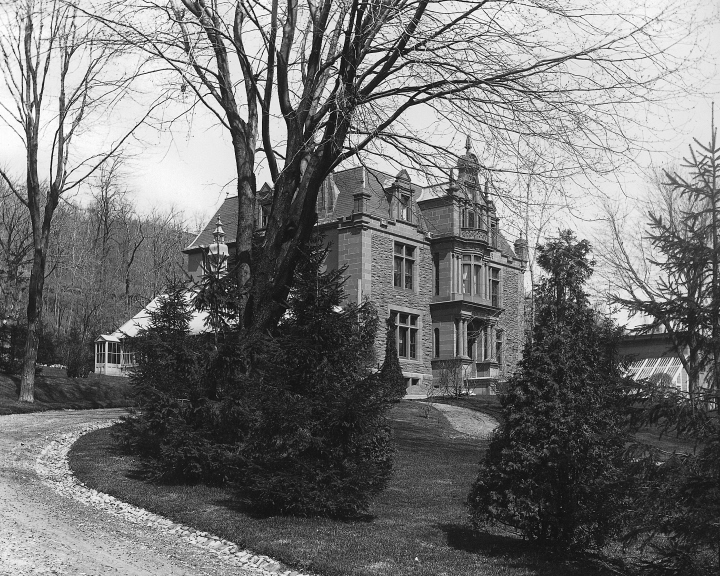
Front view of Rosemount House in 1894, after renovations

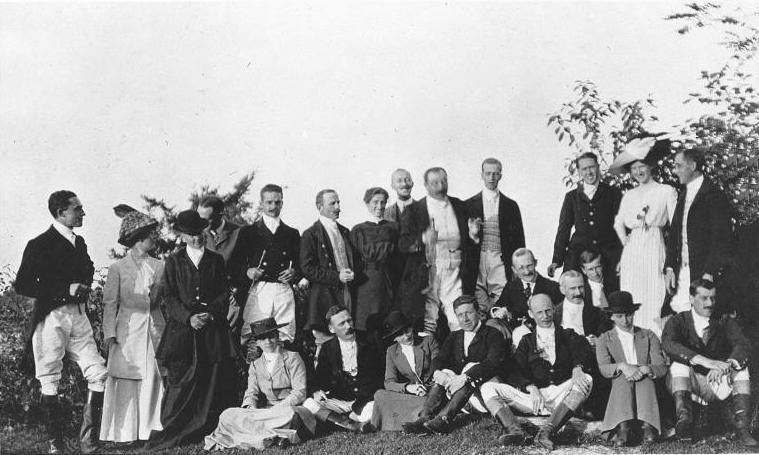
Montreal Hunt breakfast at Bertie Ogilvie's, Grey Gables, 1911

In 1871, William Ogilvie married Helen Johnston, daughter of Joseph Johnston of Beauchamps House near Paisley, Scotland. By 1872, Ogilvie had purchased Rosemount House in Montreal's Golden Square Mile, the former residence of Sir John Rose, 1st Baronet.

Ogilvie died in 1900 a very wealthy man, leaving property (not including the value of his holdings in the mills) valued at $1,431,401, with $284,832 still owed to him from various debtors. His collection of 118 water-colours were valued alone at $24,000.

The Ogilvies were the parents of six children, of whom four survived to adulthood:

- Major Albert Edward 'Bertie' Ogilvie (1875–1948), of Rosemount and Grey Gables, Saraguay; President of the Montreal General Hospital and the Ogilvie Milling Company (1900–1902). He married Caro Bigelow, daughter of Dr. Thomas Chalmers Brainerd of Montreal, the largest explosives manufacturer in Canada, President of the Hamilton Powder Company and the Dominion Cartridge Company, the Hamilton Powder Company being the principal forerunner of C.I.L. They were the parents of a daughter, Helen Brainerd, and three sons, Lt.-Col. William Watson, Bartlett McLennan, and Ian.
- William Watson Ogilvie (1876–1906), died unmarried.
- Colonel Gavin Lang 'Guy' Ogilvie (1881–1975), educated at Trinity College, Cambridge. He married Mary Bell Gzowski, granddaughter of Sir Casimir Gzowski. Their daughter, Mary Elizabeth ('Betty'), married Brigadier-General John Meredith Cape, son of Edmund Graves Meredith Cape.
- Alice Helen Ogilvie (1885–1952).
