= David Ogilvy, 3rd Earl of Airlie =

The Right Honourable The Earl of Airlie
- Arms of the Earl of Airlie

Personal details
- Born: David Ogilvy between 1634 and 1664
- Died: 1717
- Spouse: Lady Grizel Lyon
- Relations: James Ogilvy, 1st Earl of Airlie (grandfather); George Ogilvy, 1st Lord Banff (grandfather)
- Children: 3
- Parent(s): James Ogilvy, 2nd Earl of Airlie; Helen Ogilvy

David Ogilvy, 3rd Earl of Airlie (between 1634 and 1664 – 1717) was a Scottish aristocrat. Unlike many of the Earls of Airlie, his career was not particularly turbulent. He commissioned the rebuilding of Cortachy Castle. He did not take an active part in the Jacobite rising of 1715, although his eldest son and heir was attainted for joining the Jacobite cause.

== Early life ==
Ogilvy, 3rd Earl of Airlie was born between 1634 and 1664. He was the second, but eldest surviving, son of James Ogilvy, 2nd Earl of Airlie and Helen Ogilvy. His elder brother, James, was baptised in 1633 at Banff, but died young. Among his siblings were Lady Marion Ogilvy (wife of James Elphinstone, 1st Lord Coupar and John Leslie, 4th Lord Lindores), Lady Anne Ogilvy (wife of Sir John Wood of Bonnytoun), Lady Margaret Ogilvy (wife of Alexander Falconer, 2nd Lord Falconer of Halkerton), and Lady Helen Ogilvy (who married Sir John Gordon, 1st Baronet).

His paternal grandparents were James Ogilvy, 1st Earl of Airlie and Lady Isabel Hamilton (a daughter of the 1st Earl of Haddington). His maternal grandparents were Sir George Ogilvy, 1st Lord Banff and Margaret Irvine (a daughter of Alexander Irvine of Drum, Aberdeenshire).

In 1664, he was under the care of George Halyburton, later Bishop of Dunkeld.

== Career ==
Ogilvy was the eldest surviving son and heir of one of the most distinguished of the Scottish supporters of Charles I. Upon the death of his father in 1704, he succeeded as the 3rd Earl of Airlie, 3rd Lord Ogilvy of Alith and Lintrathen, and the 9th Lord Ogilvy of Airlie (which had been created in the Peerage of Scotland in 1491). However, he lived a comparatively peaceful life. He had the family seat of Cortachy Castle substantially reconstructed.

Robert Patten, in his history of the Jacobite rising of 1715, estimated that Airlie, as chief of the Ogilvies, could nominally command about 500 armed clansmen. While Airlie and a few of his clan remained neutral during the rising, most followed his son James Ogilvy, Lord Ogilvy, who took up the Jacobite cause and for that reason was attained by an Act of Parliament on 13 November 1715. During the rising, Airlie's brother-in-law Patrick Lyon of Auchterhouse was killed fighting for the Jacobites at the Battle of Sheriffmuir. Airlie subsequently purchased the lands and barony of Auchterhouse, which descended in his family.

== Personal life ==
The contract for his marriage to Lady Grizel Lyon was signed on 8 May 1696. She was the daughter of Patrick Lyon, 3rd Earl of Strathmore and Kinghorne and Lady Helen Middleton (a daughter of the 1st Earl of Middleton). Together, they were the parents of three children:

- Lady Helen Ogilvy (d. 1721), who married John Hamilton.
- James Ogilvy, de jure 4th Earl of Airlie (1699–1731), who married Anne Erskine, daughter of David Erskine, Lord Dun, in 1730 but died without issue. After his death, she married Sir Alexander Macdonald, 7th Baronet in 1733.
- John Ogilvy, 5th Earl of Airlie (1699–1761), who married Margaret Ogilvy, the daughter of David Ogilvy of Cluny, in 1722.

Lord Airlie died in 1717. His last will, dated 22 March 1716, was proven (by probate) on 17 August 1727. On his death, his eldest son John became de jure 4th Earl of Airlie, however he could not claim the title because of the attainder. In 1725 he obtained a pardon from the Crown, and returned home before his marriage to Anne Erskine in December 1730, shortly before his death. Through his son John, he was a grandfather of David Ogilvy, Lord Ogilvy, who joined Prince Charles, and was, therefore, also attained. David fled to France, where he entered the French military service, becoming a Lieutenant General.

Peerage of Scotland
Preceded by James Ogilvy	Earl of Airlie; 1704–1717	Succeeded by James Ogilvy
