= Drummer of Cortachy =

The Drummer of Cortachy is the name given to a spirit who is thought to haunt Cortachy Castle. There are many interpretations of the story, but he is variously thought to portend the death of a member of the Ogilvy family, Earl of Airlie or the owners of Cortachy Castle. He is said to be nine foot tall and is occasionally accompanied by ghostly pipes. The legend can trace its roots back to at least the 19th century and the death of the 14th Earl of Airlie. He is said to play a tattoo when he appears.

The ghost is thought to be the spirit of a drummer for the Carlisle family; who was thrown out of a window in the high tower of the castle after incurring the jealousy of the then Lord. However, some versions of the story say that the drummer was the messenger for a hated chieftain and in yet another version of the tale, he is the spirit of a drummer who deliberately failed to warn the castle of an impending attack. In all versions of the tale he was stuffed into his drum before his death.

The most famous sighting of the drummer is said to have occurred in 1844, when Lady Airlie (or, in some versions of the tale, her guests) reportedly heard the mysterious drumming noise. According to legend, Lady Airlie later wrote on her deathbed that she "knew the drumming was for [her]." Lady Airlie died in June 1845 after giving birth to her fourth son, Donald Bruce Ogilvy. A few years later, a young Englishman, who was shooting at a lodge at night with Lord Airlie, reportedly heard the drummer. Upon asking the Lord who could be drumming outdoors on such a night, the Lord simply replied, 'Silence.' Lord Airlie died in London in within less than a week.

The spirit is now thought to be dormant since in 1900 the Earl of Airlie died in the Boer War without a reported sighting.

== See also ==
- Cortachy Castle
