= Clan Ogilvy =

Highland Scottish clan

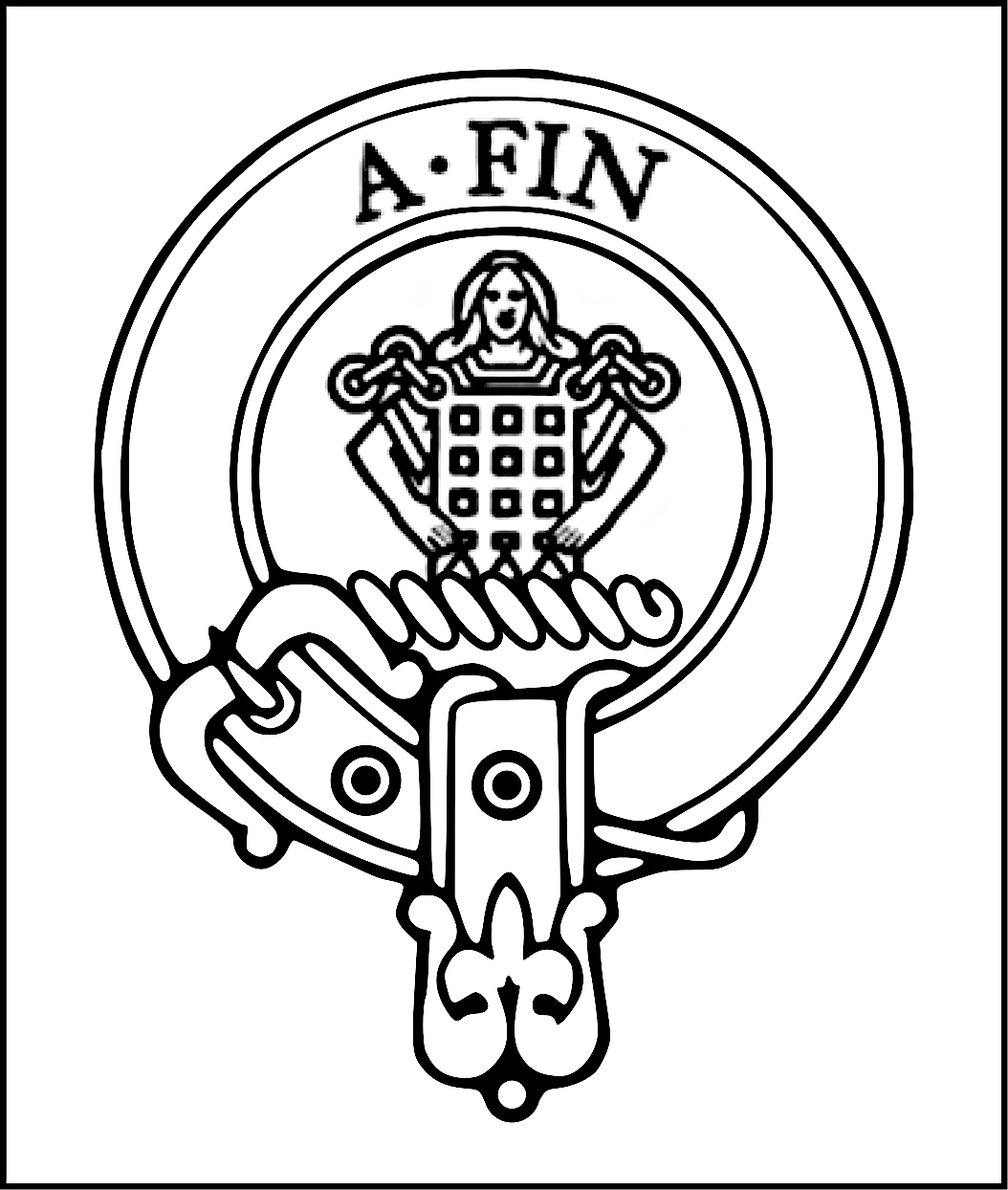
- Crest: A lady affrontee from the middle upwards Proper in Azure vestments richly attired, holding a portcullis Gules.
- Motto: Latin: "A Fin"

Profile
- Region: Highlands
- District: Angus
- Plant badge: Pentaglottis
- Pipe music: The Bonnie Hoose of Airlie

Chief
- The Rt. Hon. David John Ogilvy
- The 14th Earl of Airlie
- Historic seat: Airlie Castle
Septs of Clan Ogilvy
Airlie, Findlater, Gilchrist, MacGilchrist, Milne, Richardson, Storey
Clan branches
Ogilvy of Airlie (chiefs)
Ogilvy of Seafield (senior cadets)
Allied clans
Clan Oliphant
Clan Seton
Clan Gordon
Clan Forbes
Clan Grant
Rival clans
Clan Robertson
Clan Lindsay
Clan Campbell

Clan Ogilvy, also known as Clan Ogilvie, is a Scottish family from Angus, Scotland. Gillebride, Earl of Angus, received a barony from King William the Lion in 1163 and bestowed the lands of Ogilvy upon his son Gilbert. In 1429, Sir Patrick Ogilvy, who was later styled as Viscomte d'Angus, commanded the Scottish forces that fought alongside Saint Joan of Arc against the English, and Saint Joan of Arc marched into Orléans to the sound of bagpipes, accompanied by a guard of around 60 Scottish men-at-arms, and 70 archers. In 1491, King James IV elevated Sir James Ogilvy as Lord Ogilvy of Airlie. In 1615, Saint John Ogilvie was made a Scottish Jesuit martyr, as he was hanged for his faith, and he was canonised in the Roman Catholic Church. In 1639, the 7th Lord Ogilvy of Airlie was made the 1st Earl of Airlie by King Charles I for his support of the Crown in the Wars of the Three Kingdoms. The present Chief of Clan Ogilvie is David Ogilvy, 14th Earl of Airlie, and his uncle Angus Ogilvy married Queen Elizabeth II's first cousin, Princess Alexandra of Kent.

The historic seat of the earls of Airlie is at Airlie Castle. The Ogilvie Earls of Seafield branch were created in 1701 for James Ogilvy, 4th Earl of Findlater, who was the 1st Earl of Seafield, and the earldoms of Findlater and Seafield continued to be united until 1811, when the earldom of Findlater became dormant, while the earldom of Seafield remains extant, with its historic seat at Cullen House.

== History ==
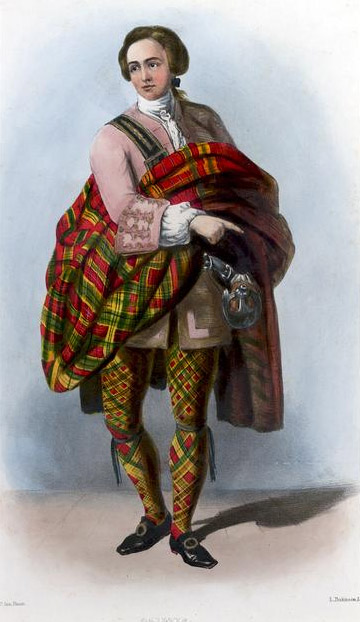
An 1845 illustration of the Ogilvie tartan by R. R. McIan, from James Logan's The Clans of the Scottish Highlands

=== Origins of the clan ===
The lands of Ogilvy are in Angus and the name is derived from the Brittonic "Ocel-fa" which means "high plain". In Pictish times Angus was ruled by a mormaer who was one of the ancient Celtic nobles of Scotland who became the first earls. The title of Mormaer of Angus became Earl of Angus. Gillebride, Earl of Angus, received a Barony from King William the Lion in 1163, and bestowed upon his son, Gilbert, the lands of Wester Powrie, Ogilvy, and Kyneithin.

=== Wars of Scottish Independence ===
Patrick de Ogilvy swore fealty to Edward I of England and appears on the Ragman Rolls of 1296. His sons Sir Patrick Ogilvy and Sir Robert de Ogilvy were instead strong supporters of Robert the Bruce. Sir Patrick Ogilvy, for his loyalty and faithful service, received a charter for the lands of Kettins, while Robert de Ogilvy was described as one of Robert the Bruce's firmest friends.

=== Sheriffs of Angus (Forfar) ===
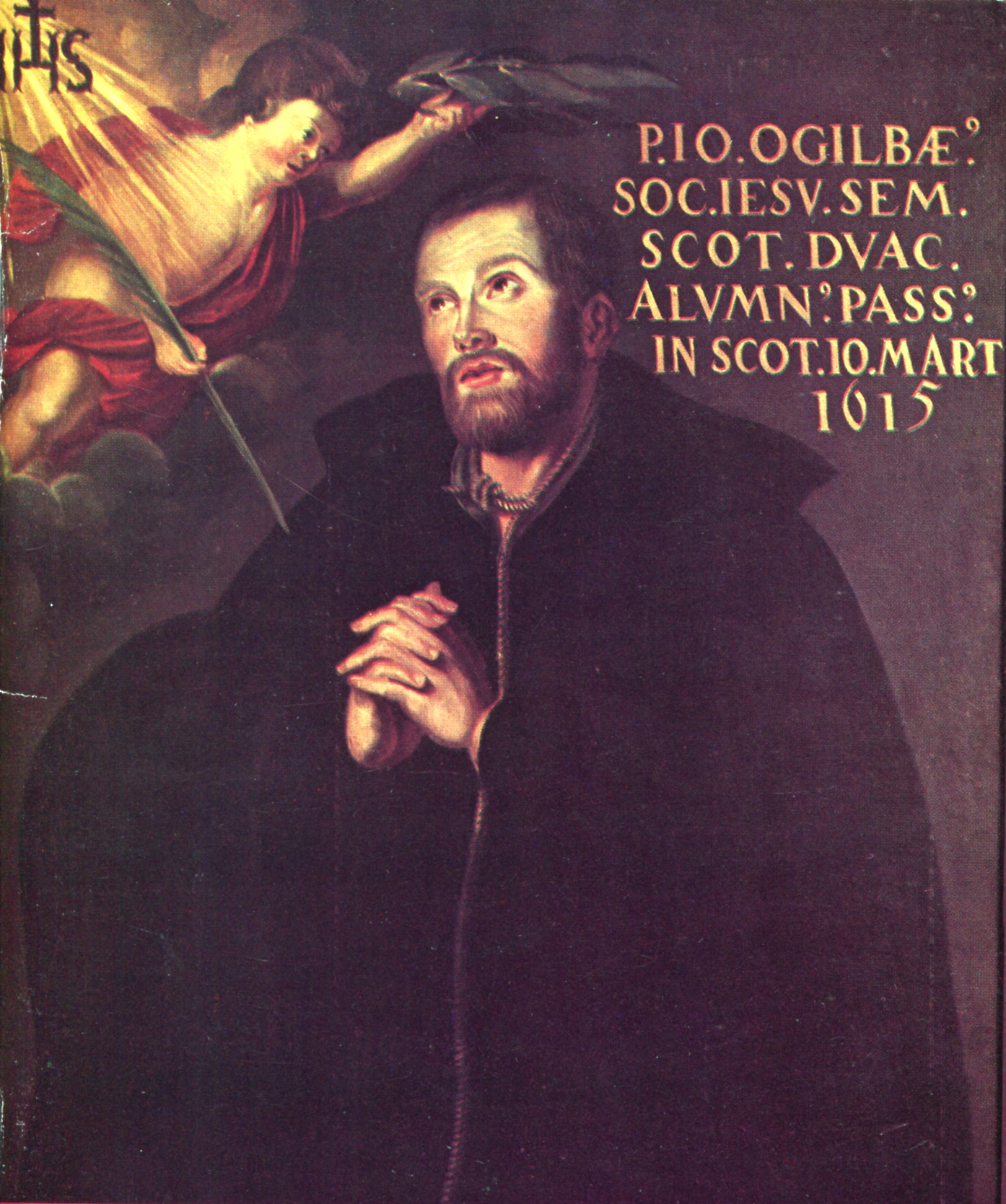
Saint John Ogilvie, Jesuit martyr and saint of the Roman Catholic Church

In 1365 the Ogilvys became hereditary Sheriffs of Angus. Walter Ogilvy, on the death of his uncle Sir Malcolm Ramsay, succeeded him as the Sheriff of Forfar. In 1369, he gained the barony of Cortachy. In 1391 Sir Walter Ogilvy, Sheriff of Angus, led Clan Ogilvy in battle against Alexander Stewart, Earl of Buchan (the Wolf of Badenoch) during the Raid of Angus.

=== 14th and 15th centuries ===
Ogilvys fought at the Battle of Harlaw in 1411. Sir Patrick Ogilvy commanded the Scottish forces that fought alongside Joan of Arc against the English, and he was styled Viscomte d'Angus. The Clan Ogilvy, supported by men from the Clan Oliphant, Clan Seton, Clan Gordon and the Clan Forbes fought at the Battle of Arbroath on 24 January 1445 against the Master of Crawford and his Clan Lindsay.

In 1425 Sir Walter Ogilvy, younger son of Ogilvy of Wester Powrie, was appointed High Treasurer of Scotland. He was also an ambassador to England in 1430 and four years later he attended Princess Margaret on her marriage to the Dauphin, heir to the throne of France. Sir Walter had numerous sons, including another Walter who became the ancestor of the Earls of Seafield. His eldest son was Sir John Ogilvy of Lintrathern who received a charter for Airlie Castle and its lands in 1459. In 1491 Sir John's son, Sir James Ogilvy of Airlie was appointed ambassador to Denmark.

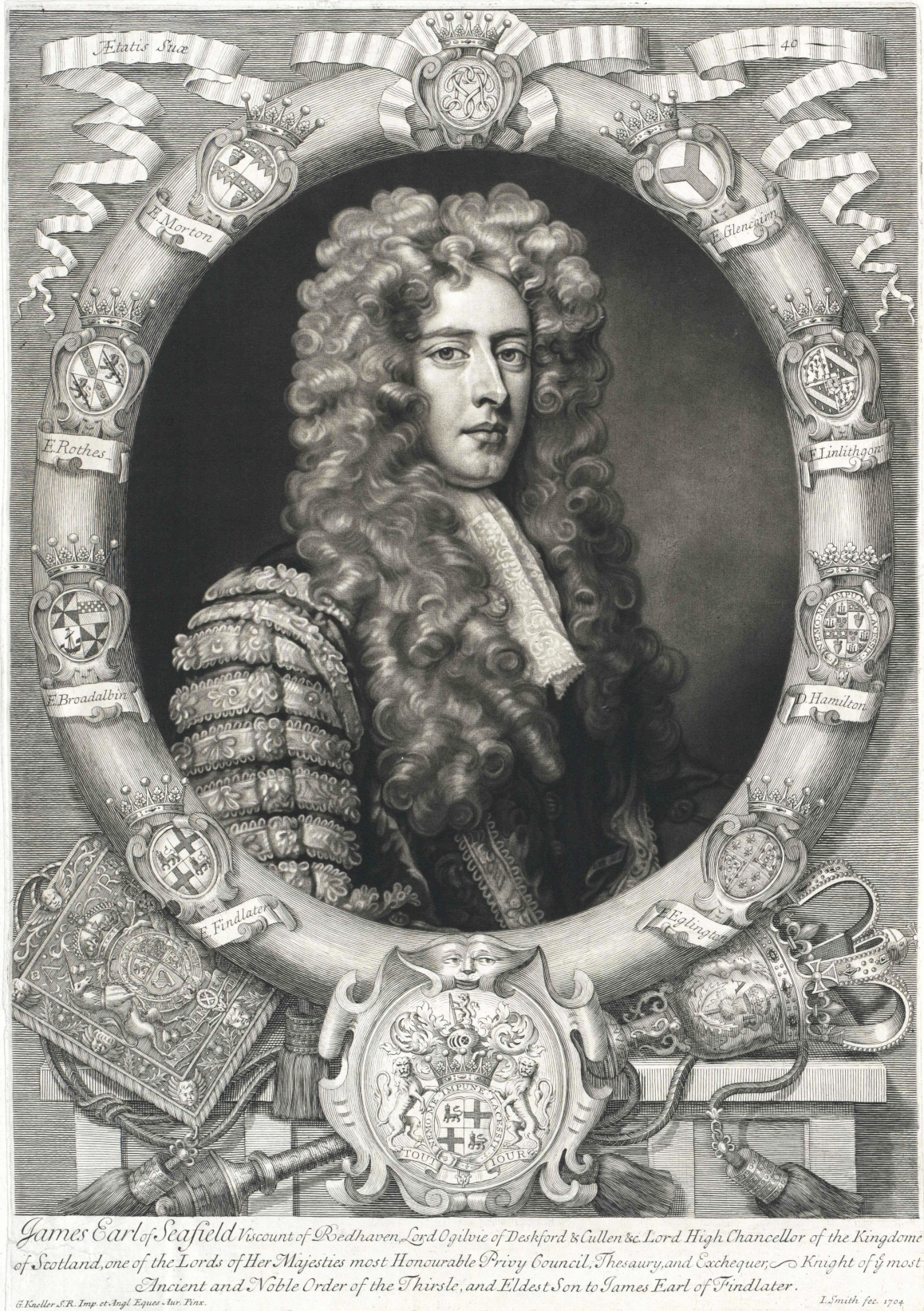
James Ogilvy, 1st Earl of Seafield and Lord Chief Baron of Scotland

=== 16th century and the Anglo-Scottish wars ===
James Ogilvy, the eldest son of the fourth Lord was killed at the Battle of Pinkie Cleugh in 1547.

=== 17th century and the Civil War ===
In 1615, Saint John Ogilvie was hanged at Glasgow Cross. In 1639 the seventh Lord Ogilvy was created Earl of Airlie. The earl and his sons joined James Graham, 1st Marquis of Montrose to oppose enemies of Charles I of England. The earl fought with distinction at the Battle of Kilsyth, where Montrose was victorious. Sir Thomas Ogilvy, the earl's second son raised his own regiment to fight for the royalists but he was killed at the Battle of Inverlochy (1645), which was another victory for Montrose. The earl's eldest son, Lord Ogilvy fought at the Battle of Philiphaugh in February 1645, where Montrose was taken by surprise by a strong force of Covenanter cavalry under General David Leslie, Lord Newark. Montrose escaped, but Ogilvy was captured. Ogilvy awaited execution in St Andrews Castle however when his sister visited she exchanged clothes with him and he passed unnoticed by the guards. Ogilvy lived to see the Restoration.

=== 18th century and the Jacobite risings ===
Standard used by Lord Ogilvy's regiment at the Battle of Culloden.

The Clan Ogilvy supported the Stuart cause and joined the Earl of Mar in the Jacobite rising of 1715. Lord Ogilvy was attained but was allowed to return home in 1725, although his titles were not restored. When he died in 1730 his younger brother, John Ogilvy, assumed the style Earl of Airlie. During the Jacobite rising of 1745 his son, David Ogilvy, raised a regiment that was composed mostly of Ogilvys to fight for Prince Charles Edward Stuart. In 1746 the regiment fought at the Battle of Culloden. After the defeat at Culloden Ogilvy escaped to France. There he entered royal service and obtained the rank of general. The earldom of Airlie was not restored until an Act of Parliament in 1896 when it was confirmed to David Ogilvy, sixth earl. The Ogilvy Earl of Seafield had in fact supported the Acts of Union 1707.

== Extant clan ==
David John Ogilvy, 14th Earl of Airlie is the present Chief of Clan Ogilvie. His father, the 13th Earl, served as Lord Chamberlain to Queen Elizabeth II. Sir Angus Ogilvy, the uncle of the chief, married HRH Princess Alexandra of Kent.

== Clan castles ==
- Airlie Castle, also known as Errolly Castle, is about four miles north-east of Alyth in Angus. The original castle was built in 1432 by the Ogilvies, with major renovations in 1793.
- Cortachy Castle, about three miles north of Kirriemuir, Angus, is a courtyard castle that dates from the fifteenth century. It came to the Ogilvies in 1473. Charles II of England spent a night at the castle in 1650 in what is now known as the 'King's Room'. The following year it was sacked by Oliver Cromwell.
- Auchindoun Castle was held by the Ogilvies from 1482 until 1535.
- Findlater Castle, east of Cullen, Moray, was the seat of the Ogilvies of Findlater and Deskford, whose descendants became Earls of Seafield.

== See also ==
- Ogilvie (name)
- Ogilvy (name)
- Scottish clan
