= Airlie, Angus =

Coordinates: 56.649328°N 3.123623°W

Airlie: Scottish Gaelic: Iarlaidh
- Location within Angus
- OS grid reference: NO312514
- Council area: Angus
- Lieutenancy area: Angus
- Country: Scotland
- Sovereign state: United Kingdom
- Post town: KIRRIEMUIR
- Postcode district: DD8
- Dialling code: 01575
- Police: Scotland
- Fire: Scottish
- Ambulance: Scottish
- UK Parliament: Angus
- Scottish Parliament: Angus South

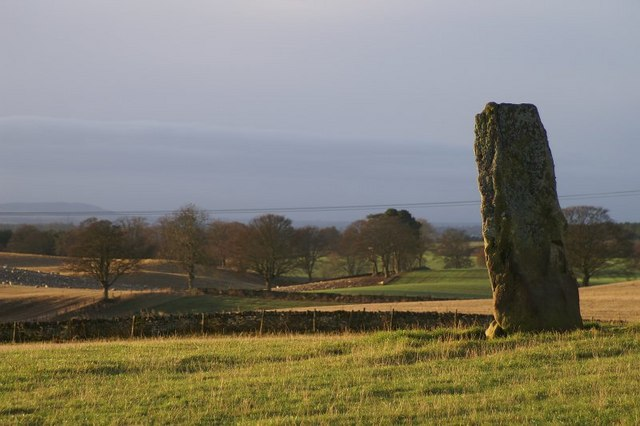
Standing Stone by Baitland of Airlie

Airlie (Scots pronunciation: [ˈerli]; Scottish Gaelic: Iarlaidh) is a civil parish in the Scottish council area of Angus. It is the seat of the Earl of Airlie, and the location of Airlie Castle. It comprises Craigton of Airlie, Baitland of Airlie and Kirkton of Airlie. There is a standing stone in a field just east of the Baitland; various Pictish and Roman relics (stone coffins etc.) have been uncovered and the primary school is reputed to have been built on the site of an old graveyard. Airlie also contains one of the finest examples of a Pictish souterrain in Scotland, with the carving of a snake clearly visible in the ceiling.

== Airlie Castle ==
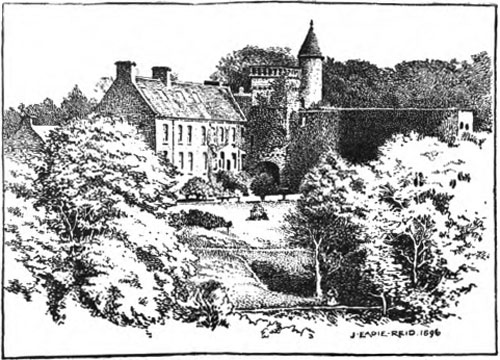
Drawing of "The Bonnie Hoose o' Airlie"

Airlie Castle is not currently open to the public, however it is remembered in the song The Bonnie Hoose o' Airlie which is mentioned in Robert Louis Stevenson's novel Kidnapped. The song commemorates the burning of the castle (some of the stonework is still black) by the Earl of Argyll, claiming to act on behalf of the anti-royalists, while the earl was away fighting for the Jacobite cause. However, it is also claimed that Forter Castle in Glen Isla was the "bonnie hoose" destroyed in 1640. It is also mentioned in the song Wha'll be King but Charlie?, as performed by The Corries, presumably because it is a good rhyme for "Chairlie".
