= James Ogilvy, 2nd Earl of Airlie =

James Ogilvy, 2nd Earl of Airlie (c. 1615 – 1704), known by the courtesy title Lord Ogilvy until 1665, was a Scottish peer.

== Early life ==
The eldest son of James Ogilvy, 1st Earl of Airlie, Ogilvy was probably born about 1610.

== Participation in the Civil Wars ==
Sharing ardently the royalist sympathies of his father, Ogilvy took a very active part on behalf of Charles I during the Scottish wars. In 1640 he held Airlie Castle against Lord Montrose, then a covenanter; but, being obliged to surrender, he was permitted, with his wife, to escape, an incident for which Montrose was sharply challenged by the Tables. Refusing to obey the order of the Parliament of Scotland to appear before them and give caution for keeping the peace, Ogilvy was declared a rebel, and was specially exempted from pardon. In February 1643 he accompanied Montrose to Charles I's court, to concert measures for waging war against the Scottish covenanters. On 26 July 1643, he was charged with high treason in his absence, but continued a close companion of Montrose, acting as one of his aides-de-camp.

In August 1644 he was sent with despatches to the king, and fell into the hands of the English parliamentary troops near Preston in Lancashire. He was taken prisoner to Edinburgh, and remained incarcerated in the Tolbooth there for more than a year, undergoing frequent examination, but constantly declining to acknowledge the authority of the covenanters. He was frequently visited by his mother, sister, and wife, who in August 1644 petitioned for his removal from the then plague-infected town, and obtained an order for his removal to the Bass Rock.

Before, however, this change could be effected, Montrose had inflicted a severe defeat on the covenanters at the Battle of Kilsyth (15 August 1645), which practically placed the country at his disposal, and he sent orders to Edinburgh for the release of Lord Ogilvy and other prisoners, which were at once obeyed. Rejoining Montrose, Ogilvy resumed active service, and was present at the Battle of Philiphaugh (13 September 1645), where, the royalist army being routed, he was again captured, and, after confinement in several prisons, was on 16 January 1646 tried at St Andrews and condemned to death. The day appointed for his decapitation was the 20th of that month; but on the preceding eve his elder sister changed clothes with him in his prison in St Andrews Castle, and he escaped.

The sum of £1,000 sterling was offered for his capture dead or alive, but the reward was ineffectual, and in the following July he secured a pardon from Lord Middleton, which the parliament were obliged to confirm. He also gave satisfaction to the Kirk, and was released from excommunication. In May 1649 he took part in Pluscarden's rising in the north.

Upon the coronation of Charles II at Scone in 1650, Ogilvy took service in the Scottish army, and was captured by Cromwell's troopers near Alyth in Forfarshire, with the Committee of Estates, on 28 August 1651. He was then sent prisoner from Dundee to Tynemouth Castle, and from there to the Tower of London. A year later he was liberated on condition that he would not leave London without permission; but, on a general order, he was soon recommitted to the Tower. In one of his petitions to Cromwell he states that he was seized by a party of horse, under General Monck, while peaceably residing at his mansion-house in Scotland, and protests that he had never taken an active part against the Commonwealth. He remained a prisoner until January 1657, with the exception of three months' leave, granted in July 1655, for the purpose of visiting Scotland. He was released in 1657 on finding security in £20,000.

== After the Restoration ==
After the Restoration he endeavoured to redeem his losses by obtaining grants from Charles II, but without much result. He succeeded as second Earl of Airlie on the death of his father in 1666, and is frequently mentioned in the parliamentary proceedings of the reigns of Charles II and James II.

At the revolution he declared his support for William III. For not attending the meetings of parliament he was in 1689, and again in 1693, fined 1,200 pounds Scots, which, however, were remitted, and his attendance excused, on account of his old age and infirmities. A similar dispensation was granted to him in November 1700.

== Death ==
Airlie probably died in 1704, as on 31 July of that year his son David was served as his heir.

== Personal life ==
According to Mark Napier, Lord Ogilvy in his youth courted Magdalene Carnegie, the youngest daughter of David Carnegie, 1st Earl of Southesk, and afterwards wife of Montrose; and that he was on his way to propose to her when, in fording a river, he was thrown from his horse; regarding the ducking as an unfavourable omen, he proceeded no further on that errand.

Airlie was, however, twice married. His first wife was Helen Ogilvy, daughter of George Ogilvy, 1st Lord Banff, by whom he had one son David (who succeeded him as Earl), and four daughters. He later married Mary, daughter of Sir James Grant of Grant, the widow of Lewis Gordon, 3rd Marquess of Huntly, but by her he had no issue.

Peerage of Scotland
Preceded by James Ogilvy	Earl of Airlie; 1665–1704	Succeeded by David Ogilvy

== Attribution ==
- This article incorporates text from a publication now in the public domain: "Ogilvy, James (1615?-1704?)". Dictionary of National Biography. London: Smith, Elder & Co. 1885–1900.
