= The Bonnie House of Airlie =

Traditional song

The Bonnie House of Airlie is a traditional Scottish folk song of the seventeenth century, telling the tale of the raid by Archibald Campbell, Earl of Argyll, on Airlie Castle, the home of James Ogilvy, Earl of Airlie, in the summer of 1640. A broadsheet version first appeared in 1790 and it received formal publication as number 199 in Francis Child's collection The English and Scottish Popular Ballads of 1882.

== History ==
Although there had been traditional enmity between the Campbells and Ogilvys since at least the sixteenth century, their private feud intensified in 1638, when the two clans joined opposite sides in the National Covenant rebellion: Ogilvy supported the king, Charles I, and Campbell the rebels. When James Ogilvy raised a regiment of several hundred men and marched south to the king's aid, Archibald, claiming to act on behalf of the anti-royalist alliance, seized and destroyed the castle of Airlie and, according to some accounts, brutally raped James Ogilvy's wife. Ogilvy's wife is inaccurately referred to as Margaret in certain versions of the song. In reality, James Ogilvy married Lady Isabel Hamilton.

== The texts ==
Child, collecting in the 1870s, found four broadly similar versions. These all describe how the castle was destroyed by fire after Lady Ogilvy refused to reveal the whereabouts of the family treasure. However other versions continued in oral circulation and the one reproduced here, with its bleak penultimate verse, was collected on 27 June 1955 in Fetterangus by Hamish Henderson and Peter Kennedy from Lucy Stewart:

It fell on a day, a bonny summer day,
When the corn was ripe and yellow,
That there fell oot a great dispute
Between Argyle aye and Airlie.

Lady Margaret looked o’er yon high castle wall,
And O but she sighed sairly.
She saw Argyle and a his men
Come to plunder the bonny hoose o Airlie.

"Come doun, come doun Lady Margaret," he said.
"Come doun and kiss me fairly
Or gin the morning's clear daylight
I willna leave a standing stane in Airlie."

"I’ll no come doun, ye false Argyll,
Nor will I kiss thee fairly.
I wouldnae kiss the false Argyle
Though you wouldna leave a standin stane in Airlie."

"For if my gude lord had been at hame,
As he's awa wi Chairlie,
There wouldnae come a Campbell frae Argyle
Dare trod upon the bonny green o Airlie."

"For I hae bore him seven bonny sons,
The eighth yin has never seen his daddy
But if I had as mony ower again
They would all be men for Chairlie."

But poor Lady Margaret was forced to come doun
And oh but she sighed sairly
For there in front o all his men
She was ravished on the bowlin green o Airlie.

"Draw your dirks, draw your dirks," cried the brave Locheil.
"Unsheath your sword," cried Chairlie,
"We’ll kindle sic a lowe roond the false Argyle,
And licht it wi a spark oot o Airlie."

Given the numerous references to "Chairlie" and the allusion to Locheil, the song has inevitably taken on additional layers of meaning, being incorrectly understood to refer to Charles Edward Stuart and Archibald Cameron of Lochiel in the 1745 rebellion, long after the events at Airlie.

== Versions ==
Alan Lomax included the song in his Classic Ballads of Britain and Ireland of 1961. It was sung by Belle Stewart, who learned the song from her 91-year-old uncle Henry MacDonald, and recorded by Peter Kennedy. Later recordings, using different tunes, have been made by Ewan MacColl and Kate Rusby.

Different versions of the song were collected in Scotland, Canada, and the US.
