= Wha'll be King but Charlie? =

Jacobite song

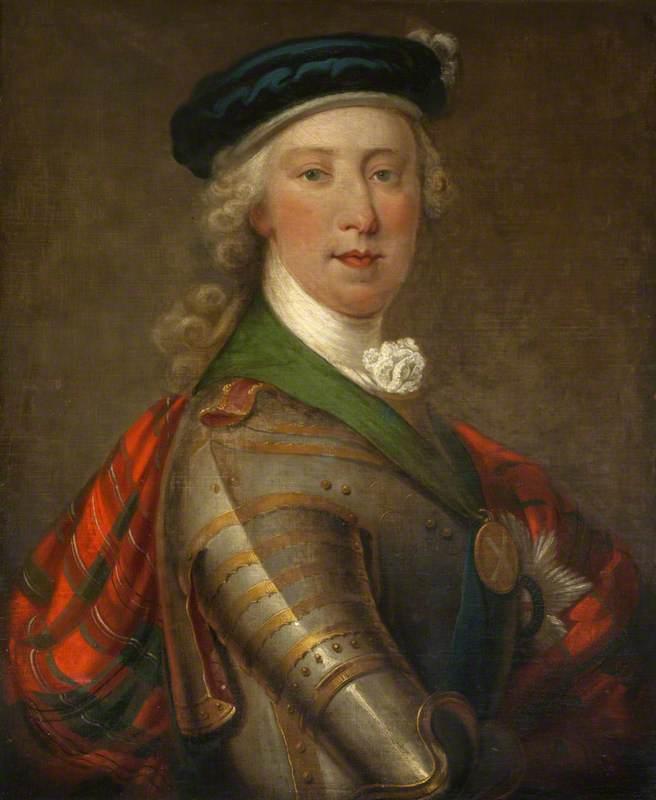
- Charles Edward Stuart, contested King of Scotland and leader of the 1745 Jacobite Rising. Painted in the circle of Louis Tocqué.

Song
- Language: Scots
- Written: Late 18th century
- Lyricist(s): Caroline Nairne

"Wha'll be King but Charlie?" also known as The News from Moidart, is a song about Bonnie Prince Charlie, sung to the tune of 'Tidy Woman', a traditional Irish jig the date of which is unclear but the tune was well known by 1745. The lyrics were written by Caroline Nairne (1766–1845). Because Nairne published anonymously, the authorship of this and her other poems and lyrics was once unclear, however, late in her life Nairne identified herself and modern scholars accept that these lyrics are hers. Carolina, Baroness Nairne was a Jacobite from a Jacobite family living at a time when the last remnants of political Jacobitism were fading as Scotland entered a period of Romantic nationalism and literary romanticism. Bonnie Prince Charlie stayed in the house where Caroline Nairne was born and reared when fleeing British capture after losing the Battle of Culloden.

Wha'll be King but Charlie? was popular from the late 18th into the 20th century. The tune was borrowed for use as an African-American spiritual, with an allusion in the hymn to "King Jesus" suggesting that the name of the tune was known to its adaptor. In the 1840s bestseller Two Years Before the Mast, Richard Henry Dana, describes a gathering of sailors with the French singing "La Marseillaise", the Germans singing "O du lieber Augustin", English sailors singing "Rule, Britannia!" and the Scots, "Wha'll be King but Charlie?".

== Notable usage of the song ==
In 1867 The San Jose Mercury campaigned for the election of Charles Maclay to the California State Senate with the song Wha'll be King but Charlie?

The song is one of the dance tunes played in the final scene of the 1921 film Sentimental Tommy as dancers fill the screen.

In his novel The starling: a Scotch story, Norman McLeod tells of a boy who taught his pet starling to whistle the tune of "Wha'll be King but Charlie?".

The Corries, a late 20th century Scottish singing group, performed the song in concert and recorded it. as did the Scottish folk trio The McCalmans

== Meaning ==
"Wha'll" is the Scots word for "who'll" (who will). The song references Bonnie Prince Charlie, the son of James Francis Edward Stuart and from 1766 a Stuart pretender to the crown of England, Scotland and Ireland. Prince Charlie traveled to Scotland to lead the Jacobite rising of 1745, which would prove to be the last Jacobite military attempt to capture the throne. After losing the Battle of Culloden, Prince Charlie fled to the remote peninsula of Moidart, from which, with a handful of leading Jacobites, he fled to exile in France.

== Lyrics ==
Scots (original) 18th century	English (translation) 21st century
The news frae Moidart cam' yestreen Will soon gar mony ferlie; For ships o' war hae just come in, And landit Royal Charlie? Chorus Come thro' the heather, around him gather, Ye're a' the welcomer early; Around him cling wi' a' your kin; For wha'll be king but Charlie? Come thro' the heather, around him gather, Come Ronald, come Donald, come a' thegither, And crown your rightfu' lawfu' king! For wha'll be king but Charlie? The Hieland clans, wi sword in hand, Frae John o' Groats' to Airlie, Hae to a man declared to stand Or fa' wi' Royal Charlie. Chorus The Lowlands a', baith great an' sma, Wi' mony a lord and laird, hae Declar'd for Scotia's king an' law, An' speir ye wha but Charlie. Chorus There's ne'er a lass in a' the lan', But vows baith late an' early, She'll ne'er to man gie heart nor han' Wha wadna fecht for Charlie. Chorus Then here's a health to Charlie's cause, And be't complete an' early; His very name our heart's blood warms; To arms for Royal Charlie! Come thro' the heather, around him gather, Ye're a' the welcomer early; Around him cling wi' a' your kin; For wha'll be king but Charlie? Come thro' the heather, around him gather, Come Ronald, come Donald, come a' thegither, And crown your richtfu' lawfu' king! For wha'll be king but Charlie?	The news from Moidart came last night Will soon bring much surprise (Note: Ferlie has connotations of marvel and curiosity, not just unexpectedness.) For ships of war have just come in, And landed Royal Charlie? Chorus Come through the heather, around him gather, You're all the welcomer early; Around him cling, with all your kin; For who'll be King but Charlie? Come through the heather, around him gather, Come Ronald, come Donald, come all together, And crown your rightful, lawful king! For who'll be King but Charlie? The Highland clans, with sword in hand, From John o' Groats to Airlie, Have to a man declared to stand Or fall with Royal Charlie. Chorus The Lowlands all, both great and small, With many a lord and landowner, have Declared for Scotia's king and law, and you ask, "Who but Charlie?" Chorus There's never a lass in all the land, But those who'll always vow, She'll never give heart or hand to a man Who wouldn't fight for Charlie. Chorus So here's a toast to Charlie's cause, And be it complete and early; His very name warms our heart's blood; To arms for Royal Charlie! Come through the heather, around him gather, You're all the welcomer early; Around him cling, with all your kin; For who'll be King but Charlie? Come through the heather, around him gather, Come Ronald, come Donald, come all together, And crown your rightful, lawful king! For who'll be King but Charlie?
