= Airlie Castle =

Mansion in Airlie, Angus, Scotland

- Airlie, Angus, Scotland
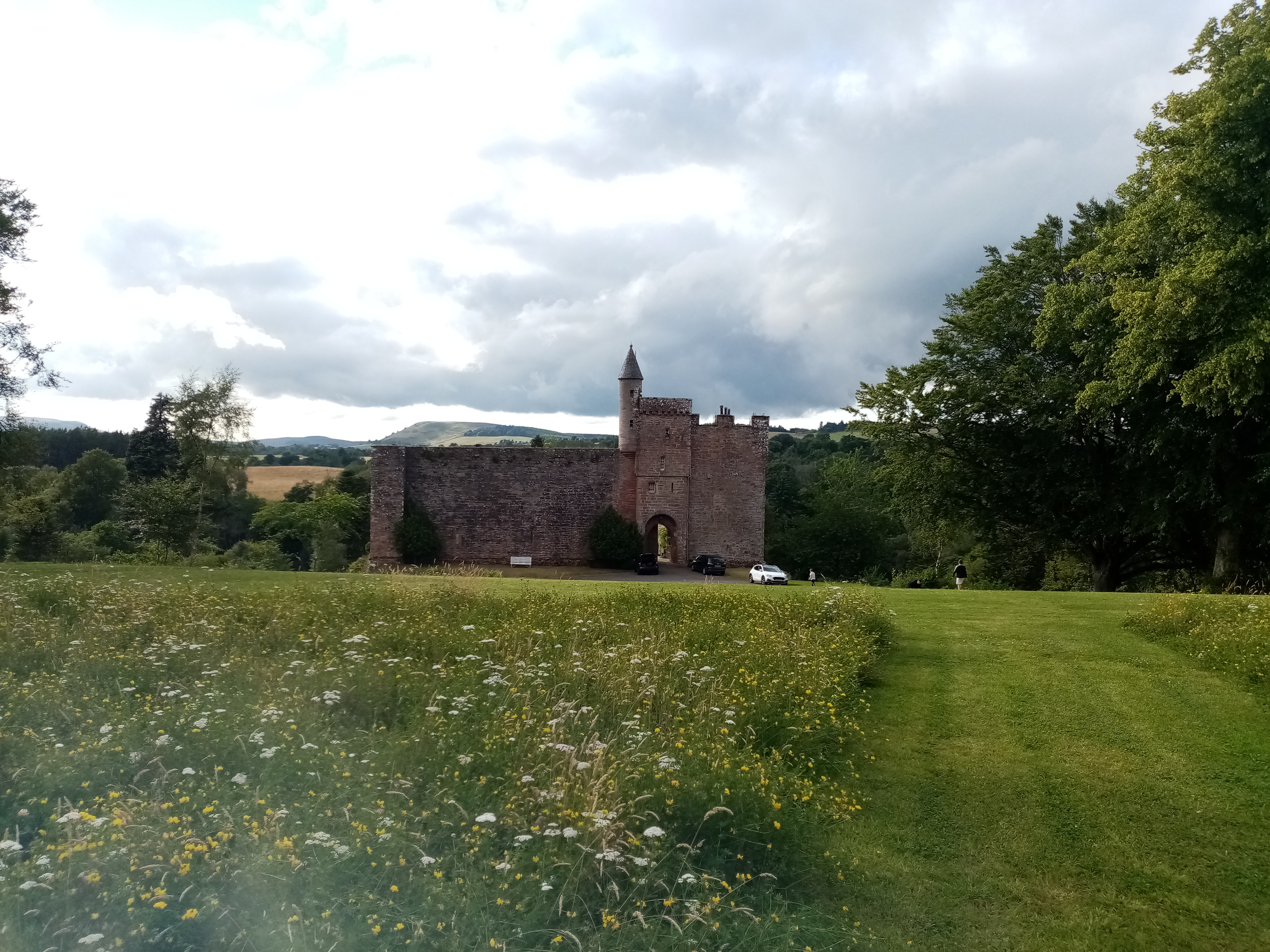
- The castle in 2021

Site information
- Type: Mansion
- Open to the public: Private

Location
- Coordinates: 56.6562°N 3.1551°W
- Grid reference: grid reference NO 2928 5220

Site history
- Built: 15th century; rebuilt 19th century
- Materials: Stone

Designations

Inventory of Gardens and Designed Landscapes in Scotland
- Official name: Airlie Castle
- Designated: 30 June 1987
- Reference no.: GDL00009

Airlie Castle is a property in the parish of Airlie, Angus, near the junction of the Isla and Melgund rivers, 9 kilometres west of Kirriemuir, Angus, Scotland. A castle was built on the site in c. 1432 and was burned down in 1640, with a mansion house built incorporating and on top of some of the ruins in c. 1792–93, and occupied today. The house and the stables are Category B listed buildings, and the grounds are included in the Inventory of Gardens and Designed Landscapes in Scotland.

== History ==
King James I of Scotland granted lands to Walter Ogilvy of Lintrathen, Lord High Treasurer of Scotland, in 1432. Walter Ogilvy then built the castle at the confluence of the River Isla and the Melgam Water. It sits on a raised position with a steep 400 ft drop to the rivers below. A moat on the eastern approach further protected the castle. It became a stronghold and chief residence of the Ogilvies. James Ogilvy, 5th Lord Ogilvy of Airlie planned to rebuild the castle in 1564.

The castle consisted of a rectangular courtyard with walls three metres thick. The east wall of the original courtyard still stands; it is about 36 metres long and 9 metres tall. An entrance gateway that now has a square tower on it sits at the north end of this wall, though the tower was built later than the original courtyard.

In 1639, at York, Charles I created James Ogilvy the 1st Earl of Airlie. James refused to sign the National Covenant. Furthermore, during the Wars of the Three Kingdoms the Ogilvies supported King Charles I and the Royalist cause. Parliamentarian troops under the command of Archibald Campbell, 8th Earl of Argyll destroyed the castle in 1640; the ballad "The Bonnie Hoose o' Airlie" describes the incident. Campbell also burnt the Ogilvies' castles at Craig and Forter.

The Ogilvies did not rebuild Airlie Castle. James Ogilvy (d. 1731), the grandson of the first Earl, took part in the Jacobite rising of 1715 and was attainted; consequently, on his father's death in 1717, he was not allowed to succeed to the earldom, although he was pardoned in 1725. George II confiscated the castle.

In 1778, David Ogilvy too received a pardon and he returned to Scotland from exile in Versailles. He had a new mansion built between 1792 and 1793 that incorporated the parts of the Castle that were still standing.

== See also ==
- Airly Castle – an East Indiaman of the British East India Company
