= Cortachy =

Village in Angus, Scotland

Coordinates: 56.725017°N 2.991878°W

- Location within Angus
- OS grid reference: NO394597
- Council area: Angus
- Lieutenancy area: Angus
- Country: Scotland
- Sovereign state: United Kingdom
- Post town: KIRRIEMUIR
- Postcode district: DD8
- Dialling code: 01575
- Police: Scotland
- Fire: Scottish
- Ambulance: Scottish
- UK Parliament: Dundee East
- Scottish Parliament: Angus North East Scotland

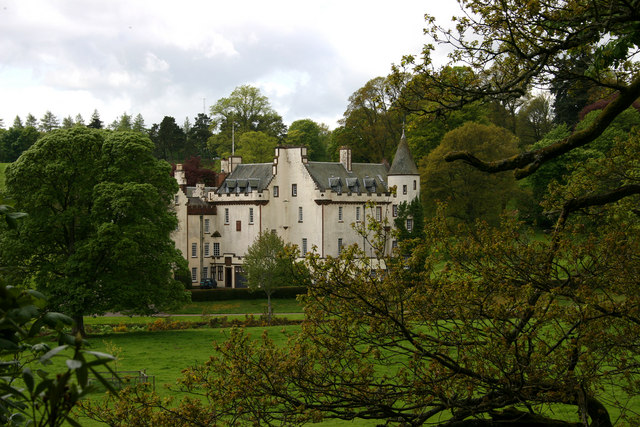
Cortachy Castle

Cortachy (Scots pronunciation: [ˈkɔrtəxe]) is a village in Angus, Scotland. It lies in at the mouth of Glen Clova, on the River South Esk, four miles (six kilometres) north of Kirriemuir. Nearby lies Cortachy Castle, seat of the Earls of Airlie.
