= Raid of Angus =

1391 armed conflict in Scotland

- Part of Wolf of Badenoch feuds
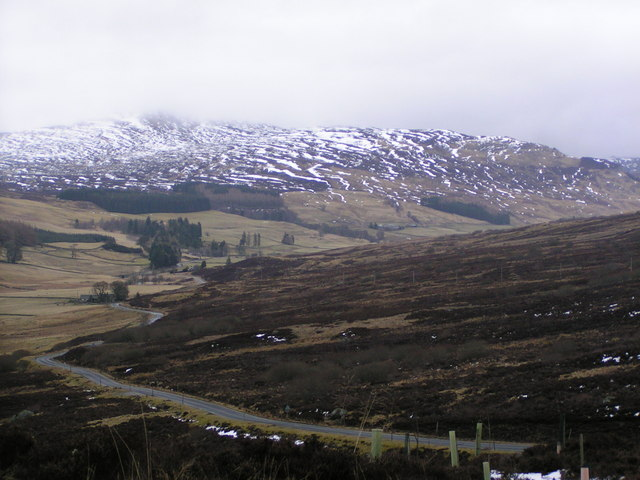
- Glen Brierachan, where the final fight took place
Date	1391
Location	Angus, Scotland
Result	Stewart and allied victory

Belligerents
Clan Stewart; Clan Robertson; Clan Mackay; Clan Chattan	Clan Ogilvy; Clan Lindsay; Clan Gray

Commanders and leaders
Alexander Stewart; Angus Mackay	Sir Walter Ogilvy †; Sir David Lindsay

The Raid of Angus took place in 1391 when Alexander Stewart, Earl of Buchan, otherwise known as the Wolf of Badenoch, raided the lands of Angus, Scotland.

== Background ==
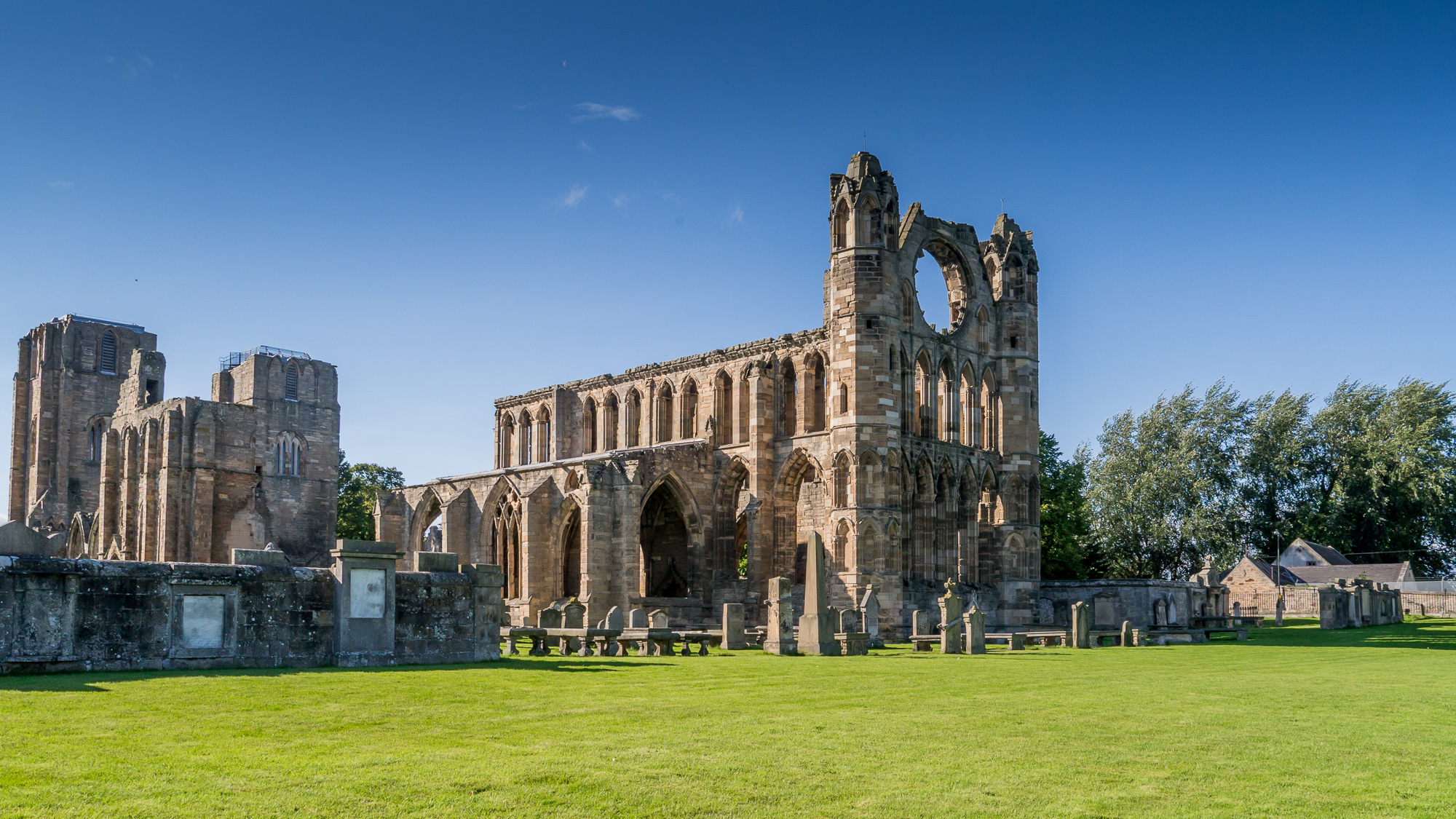
The ruins of Elgin Cathedral, which was burned by the Wolf of Badenoch during the Raid of Angus

In 1391, King Robert II's reign was largely entrusted to his sons, Robert Stewart, Earl of Fife, and Alexander Stewart, Earl of Buchan. The latter, known as the “Wolf of Badenoch”, effectively sidelined his father, and operated with cruelty and terror.

== The raid ==
Following the plunder of lands belonging to Alexander Bur, Bishop of Moray, and the burning of the Bishop's Cathedral at Elgin, his son, Duncan Stewart, led a raiding force of Robertsons into Angus, where they burned, pillaged, and slaughtered. The raiders first attacked Glen Isla and Glen Esk, and in response, a small local force gathered and attacked at Glasclune. A bloody battle ensued, but the local force failed to stop the invading Robertsons, and the raiding continued up the Strathardle. Duncan Stewart was also apparently supported by Angus Mackay, 6th of Strathnaver, whose aunt, Mariota Mackay, was the wife of Alexander Stewart, Earl of Buchan.

As Sheriff of Angus, Sir Walter Ogilvy of Auchterhouse gathered a force including his allies Sir Patrick Gray and Sir David Lindsay, and confronted the raiders at Dalnagairn, Glen Brierachan. Though charging with cavalry with heavy armor and lances, the Ogilvys were outnumbered, and Sir Walter Ogilvy, several lairds, and nearly sixty followers perished. Gray and Lindsay were seriously wounded in the fighting, but survived. An account of the battle by Andrew of Wyntoun said the following about Sir Walter Ogilvy: "Gud Schir Walter off Ogylvy, That manly knycht and that worthy Scherrave that tyme off Angus, Godlike, wis, and vertuous...."

== See also ==
- Clan Ogilvy
