= Walter Ogilvy of Wester Powrie and Auchterhouse =

Sir Walter Ogilvy of Wester Powrie and Auchterhouse (died 1391) was the Sheriff of Forfar and was killed during a skirmish near Dalnagairn, Glen Brierachan with forces of Duncan Stewart that had raided into Forfar.

== Life ==
Ogilvy was the son of Sir Walter Ogilvy and the grandson of Sir Patrick Ogilvy of Wester Powrie and Marjory Ramsay. He inherited the office of Sheriff of Forfar and the lands of Auchterhouse after the death of his father-in-law Malcolm Ramsay.

== Family ==
He married Isabel Ramsay, daughter of Malcolm Ramsay of Auchterhouse,

- Alexander
- Walter
- George
- John

He is also recorded as the father of Henry, Prebendary of Tulynestyn.

== Citations ==
Peerage of Scotland
| Preceded by Malcolm Ramsay | Sheriff of Forfar ????-1391 | Succeeded by Alexander Ogilvy |
