= Earl of Airlie =

Title in the Peerage of Scotland

Earldom of Airlie
- Creation date: 2 April 1639
- Created by: King Charles I
- Peerage: Peerage of Scotland
- First holder: James Ogilvy, 7th Lord Ogilvy of Airlie
- Present holder: David Ogilvy, 14th Earl of Airlie
- Heir apparent: The Hon. David Huxley Ogilvy, Lord Ogilvy
- Remainder to: the 1st Earl's Heirs male of the body lawfully begotten.
- Subsidiary titles: Lord Ogilvy of Airlie; Lord Ogilvy of Alyth and Lintrathen; Chief of the Name and Arms of Ogilvy

Earl of Airlie is a title of the peerage in Scotland created on 2 April 1639 for James Ogilvy, 7th Lord Ogilvy of Airlie, along with the title "Lord Ogilvy of Alith and Lintrathen". The title "Lord Ogilvy of Airlie" was created on 28 April 1491.

In 1715, James Ogilvy, son of the 3rd Earl, took part in a Jacobite uprising against the Crown and was therefore punished by being attainted; consequently, after his father's death two years later, he was unable to inherit the title. He was, however, pardoned in 1725. After his death, his brother John was recognised as the Earl; John's son David was also attainted, but later pardoned. Then, a cousin also named David Ogilvy claimed the title suggesting that the previous attainders did not affect his succession, but the House of Lords rejected his claim. Parliament later passed an Act completely reversing the attainders; therefore, David Ogilvy was allowed to assume the title. In the list of Earls below, the attainders are therefore disregarded for the purpose of numbering.

The Earl is the Chief of Clan Ogilvy.

The Earl's heir apparent uses the title ‘Lord Ogilvy’.

The family seats are Airlie Castle and Cortachy Castle, near Kirriemuir, Angus, Scotland.

== Coat of arms ==
The heraldic blazon for the coat of arms of the Earldom is Argent, a lion passant guardant gules, armed and langued azure, crowned with an imperial crown and collared with an open one, both proper.;

== Family history ==
The family was probably descended from Gillebride, Earl of Angus, who received lands from William the Lion. Sir Walter Ogilvy (died 1440) of Lintrathen, Lord High Treasurer of Scotland from 1425 to 1431, was the Son of Sir Walter Ogilvy of Wester Powrie and Auchterhouse, a man, says Andrew of Wyntoun, "stout and manfull, bauld and wycht", who was killed in 1392. He built a castle at Airlie in Forfarshire and left two sons. The elder of these, Sir John Ogilvy (D.C 1484), was the father of Sir James Ogilvy (c. 1430–c. 1504), who was made a Lord of Parliament in 1491; and the younger, Sir Walter Ogilvy, was the ancestor of the Earls of Findlater. The Earldom of Findlater, bestowed on James Ogilvy, Lord Ogilvy of Deskford, in 1638, was united in 1711 with the Earldom of Seafield and became dormant after the death of James Ogilvy, the 7th Earl, in October 1811.

Sir James Ogilvy's descendant, James Ogilvy, 5th Lord Ogilvy of Airlie (c. 1541–1606), a son of James Ogilvy, master of Ogilvy, who was killed at the Battle of Pinkie in 1547, took a leading part in Scottish politics during the reigns of Mary, Queen of Scots, and of James VI. In June 1562, the 5th Lord Ogilvy sided with James Ogilvie of Cardell and was badly injured while fighting with John Gordon of Findlater in Edinburgh. John Gordon was imprisoned until Ogilvy recovered.

The 5th Lord Ogilvy's grandson, James Ogilvy (c. 1593–1666), was created Earl of Airlie and Lord Ogilvy of Alith and Lintrathen by Charles I at York on 2 April 1639. A loyal partisan of the king, he joined Montrose in Scotland in 1644 and was one of the royalist leaders at the Battle of Kilsyth. The destruction of the Earl's castles of Airlie and of Forther in 1640 by the Earl of Argyll, who "left him not in all his lands a cock to crow day", gave rise to the song The Bonnie House of Airlie. His eldest son, James, the 2nd Earl (c. 1615–c. 1704) also fought among the royalists in Scotland; in 1644 he was taken prisoner, but he was released in the following year as a consequence of Montrose's victory at Kilsyth. He was again a prisoner after the Battle of Philiphaugh and was sentenced to death in 1646, but he escaped from his captivity at St. Andrews and was afterward pardoned. Serving with the Scots against Cromwell, he became a prisoner for the third time in 1651 and was in the Tower of London during most of the years of the Commonwealth. He was a fairly prominent man under Charles II and James VII, and in 1689 he ranged himself on the side of William of Orange. Earl's grandson, James Ogilvy (d. 1731), took part in the Jacobite rising of 1715 and was attainted; consequently, on his father's death in 1717, he was not allowed to succeed to the Earldom, although he was pardoned in 1725. When he died, his brother John (d. 1761) became Earl de jure, and John's son David (1725–1803) joined the standard of Prince Charles Edward Stuart in 1745. He was attainted, and after the defeat of the prince at Culloden, escaped to Norway and Sweden, afterward serving in the French army, where he commanded le regiment Ogilvy and was known as "le bel Ecossais". In 1778, he was pardoned and was allowed to return to Scotland. His direct line became extinct when his son David died unmarried in April 1812. After this event, David's cousin, another David Ogilvy (1785–1849), claimed the Earldom. He asserted that he was unaffected by the two attainders, but the House of Lords decided that these barred his succession. However, in 1826, the attainders were reversed by an act of Parliament, the David Ogilvy Restoration Act 1826 (7 Geo. 4. c. 50), and David became 6th Earl of Airlie. He died on 20 August 1849 and was succeeded by his son, David Graham Drummond Ogilvy (1826–1881), who was a Scottish representative peer for over thirty years. The latter's son, David Stanley William Drummond Ogilvy, the 8th Earl (1856–1900), served in Egypt in 1882 and 1885 and was killed on 11 June 1900, during the Boer War while at the head of his regiment, the 12th Lancers. His titles then passed to his son, David Lyulph Gore Wolseley Ogilvy, the 9th Earl. As of 2023, the titles are held by his grandson, David John Ogilvy, who succeeded in 2023.

Other noteworthy members of the Ogilvy family were John Ogilvy, also known as 'Powrie Ogilvy', a political adventurer who professed to serve King James VI as a spy and who served William Cecil in this capacity. Mariota Ogilvy (d. 1575) was the mistress of Cardinal Beaton. Sir George Ogilvy (d. 1663), a supporter of Charles I during the struggle with the Covenanters, was created a peer as Lord of Banff in 1642; this dignity became dormant or extinct on the death of his descendant, William Ogilvy, the 8th Lord, in June 1803. Sir George Ogilvy of Barras (d. c. 1679) defended Dunnottar Castle against Cromwell in 1651 and 1652 and was instrumental in preventing the regalia of Scotland from falling into his hands. In 1660, he has created a baronet, the title becoming extinct in 1837. Lady Blanche Ogilvy, daughter of the 10th Earl of Airlie, was the mother of Clementine Churchill, the wife of British Prime Minister Winston Churchill. Sir Angus Ogilvy, son of the 12th Earl, married Princess Alexandra of Kent; their son James is in line to inherit the throne as well as the Earldom, though both somewhat distantly.

The numbering of the titles varies, depending on whether the attainted holders of the Earldom and their successors are counted or not.

== Lords Ogilvy of Airlie (1491) ==
- James Ogilvy, 1st Lord Ogilvy of Airlie (1430–1504)
- John Ogilvy, 2nd Lord Ogilvy of Airlie (d. 1506)
- James Ogilvy, 3rd Lord Ogilvy of Airlie (d. 1524)
- James Ogilvy, 4th Lord Ogilvy of Airlie (d. 1549)
- James Ogilvy, 5th Lord Ogilvy of Airlie (d. 1606)
- James Ogilvy, 6th Lord Ogilvy of Airlie (d. 1617)
- James Ogilvy, 7th Lord Ogilvy of Airlie (1586–1665) (created Earl of Airlie in 1639)

== Earls of Airlie (1639) ==
- James Ogilvy, 1st Earl of Airlie (1586–1665)
- James Ogilvy, 2nd Earl of Airlie (c. 1615–1703)
- David Ogilvy, 3rd Earl of Airlie (d. 1717)
- James Ogilvy, de jure 4th Earl of Airlie (d. 1731)
- John Ogilvy, 5th Earl of Airlie (1699–1761)
- David Ogilvy, de jure 6th Earl of Airlie (1725–1803)
- David Ogilvy, de jure 7th Earl of Airlie (1751–1812)
- Walter Ogilvy, de jure 8th Earl of Airlie (1733–1819)
- David Ogilvy, 9th Earl of Airlie (1785–1849)
- David Graham Drummond Ogilvy, 10th Earl of Airlie (1826–1881)
- David William Stanley Ogilvy, 11th Earl of Airlie (1856–1900)
- David Lyulph Gore Wolseley Ogilvy, 12th Earl of Airlie (1893–1968)
- David George Patrick Coke Ogilvy, 13th Earl of Airlie (1926–2023)
- David John Ogilvy, 14th Earl of Airlie (born 1958)

== Present peer ==
David John Ogilvy, 14th Earl of Airlie (born 9 March 1958) is the eldest of the three sons of the 13th Earl and his wife Virginia Fortune Ryan. He was Page of Honour to Queen Elizabeth II from 1971 to 1974 and was educated at Eton and Christ Church, Oxford, graduating BA and MA.

In 1981, Ogilvy married firstly Geraldine Theodora Mary Gabriel Harmsworth, and they had one daughter, Augusta Amadeus Caroline Ogilvy. He married secondly Tarka Kings in 1991, and their son David Huxley Ogilvy, Lord Ogilvy, now the heir apparent, was born the same year, to be followed by two more sons, Joseph Ogilvy (1995) and Michael Ogilvy (1997).

He was an art dealer and became Managing director of Richard L. Feigen UK Ltd.

On 26 June 2023, he succeeded to his father's peerages, all in the peerage of Scotland: Earl of Airlie (1639); Lord Ogilvy of Alith and Lintrathen (1639); Lord Ogilvy of Airlie (1491).

== Line of succession ==
- David Ogilvy, 9th Earl of Airlie (1785–1849)
  - David Ogilvy, 10th Earl of Airlie (1826–1881)
    - David Ogilvy, 11th Earl of Airlie (1856–1900)
      - David Ogilvy, 12th Earl of Airlie (1893–1968)
        - David Ogilvy, 13th Earl of Airlie (1926–2023)
          - David Ogilvy, 14th Earl of Airlie (b. 1958)
            - (1) David Ogilvy, Lord Ogilvy (b. 1991)
            - (2) The Hon. Joseph Ogilvy (b. 1995)
            - (3) The Hon. Michael Ogilvy (b. 1997)
          - (4) The Hon. Bruce Ogilvy (b. 1959)
          - (5) The Hon. Patrick Ogilvy (b. 1971)
        - The Rt Hon. Sir Angus Ogilvy (1928–2004)
          - (6) James Ogilvy (b. 1964)
            - (7) Alexander Ogilvy (b. 1996)
        - The Hon. James Ogilvy (1934-2024)
          - (8) Shaumus Diarmid Ogilvy (b. 1966)
            - (9) Angus Julian Frederick Ogilvy (b. 2010)
            - (10) Hugo David Lisle Ogilvy (b. 2015)
          - (11) Diarmid James Ducas Ogilvy (b. 1970)
            - (12) Ivo Christopher Diarmid Ogilvy (b. 2010)

== See also ==
- Clan Ogilvy
- Earl of Seafield
