= Cortachy Castle =

Castle in Angus, Scotland

Coordinates: 56.723272°N 2.985296°W

- Cortachy, Angus, Scotland; UK grid reference NO398595
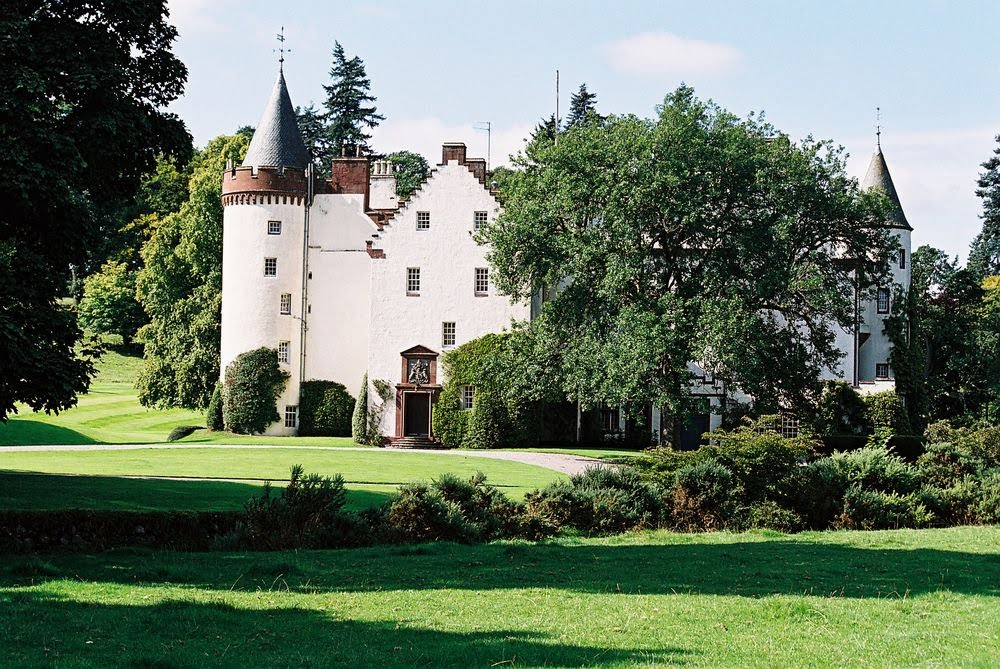
- Cortachy Castle in 2013

Site information
- Type: Mansion
- Open to the public: Private

Location
- Grid reference: grid reference NO398595

Site history
- Built: 15th century rebuilt 17th and 19th century
- Materials: Stone

Designations

Inventory of Gardens and Designed Landscapes in Scotland
- Official name: Cortachy Castle
- Designated: 30 June 1987
- Reference no.: GDL00108

Cortachy Castle is a castellated mansion House at Cortachy, Angus, Scotland, some four miles (six kilometres) north of Kirriemuir.

== History ==
The present building dates from the 15th century, preceded by an earlier structure that was owned by the Earls of Strathearn. It was acquired by the Ogilvies in 1473 and substantively modified in the 17th and 19th centuries. The 1696 remodelling was done by Tobias Bauchop of Alloa.

In 1820 it was "romanticised", as was the fashion of the day, by the addition of crenellations, plus other alterations by R & R Dickson. Part of the building was damaged by fire in 1883 and it was extensively rebuilt in the following two years by Kinnear & Peddie.

Cortachy Castle is a Category B listed building and the grounds are included in the Inventory of Gardens and Designed Landscapes in Scotland.

The castle is said to be haunted by the spirit of a drummer.

== Gallery ==
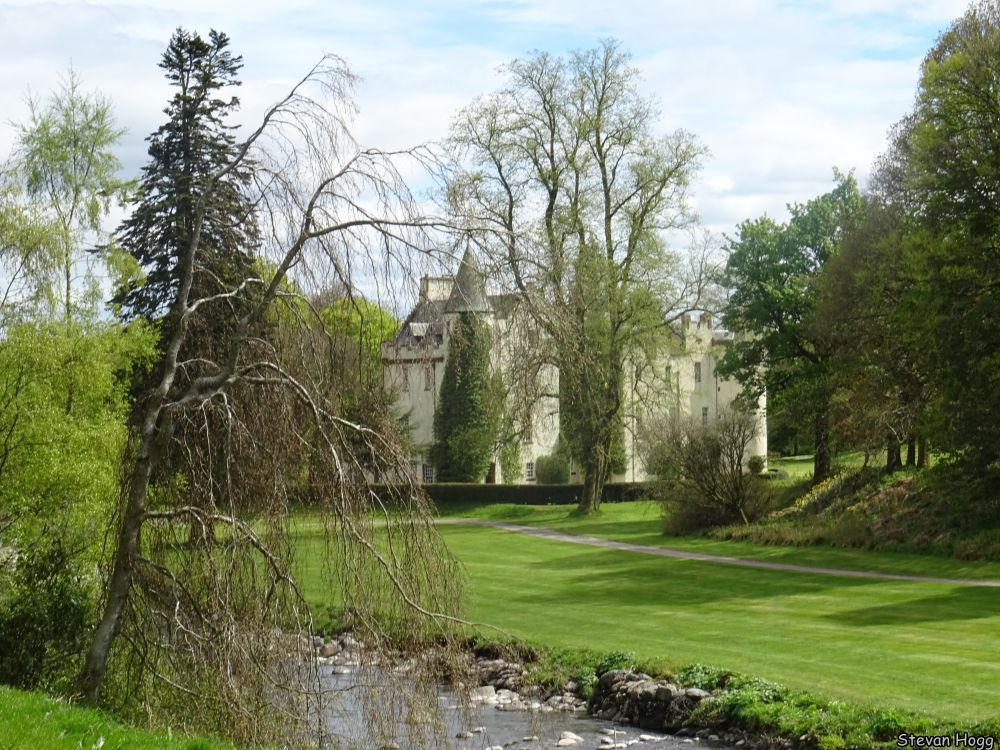
The castle in 2016

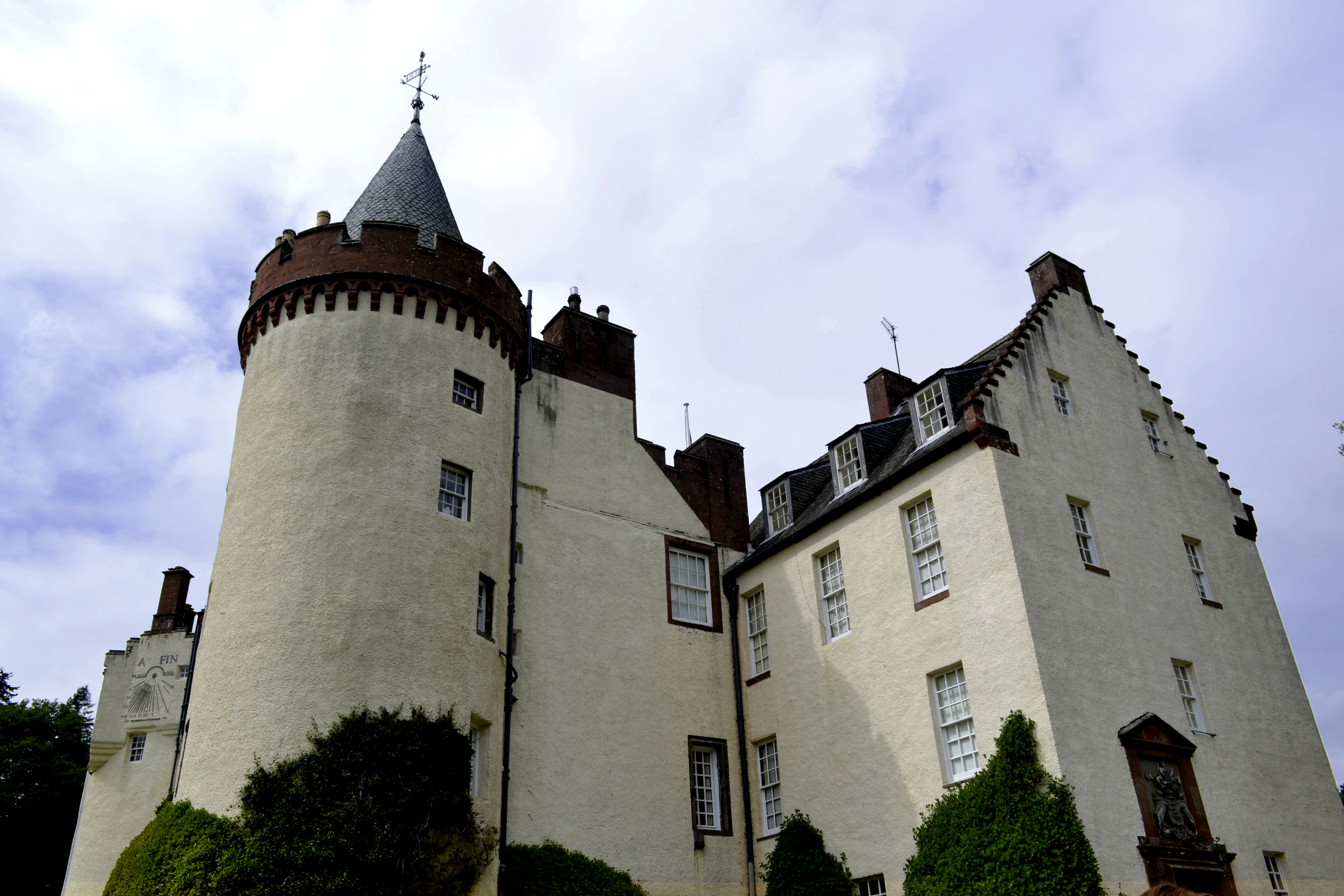
The castle in 2011

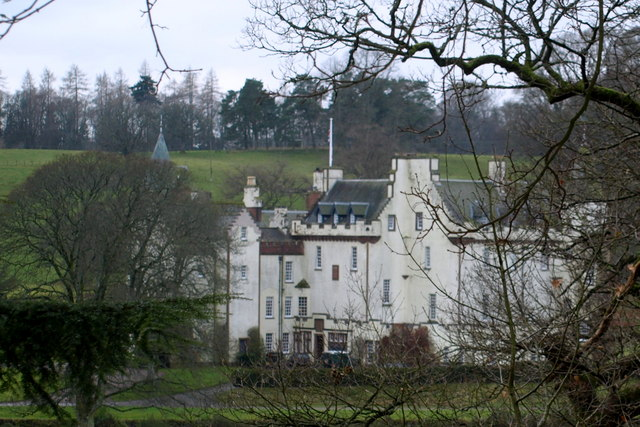
The castle in 2008

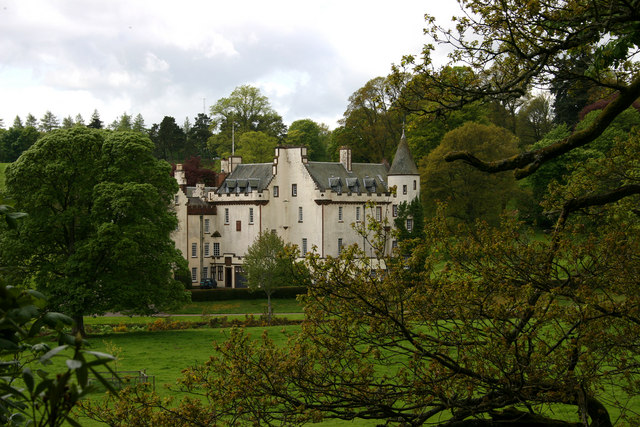
The castle in 2006

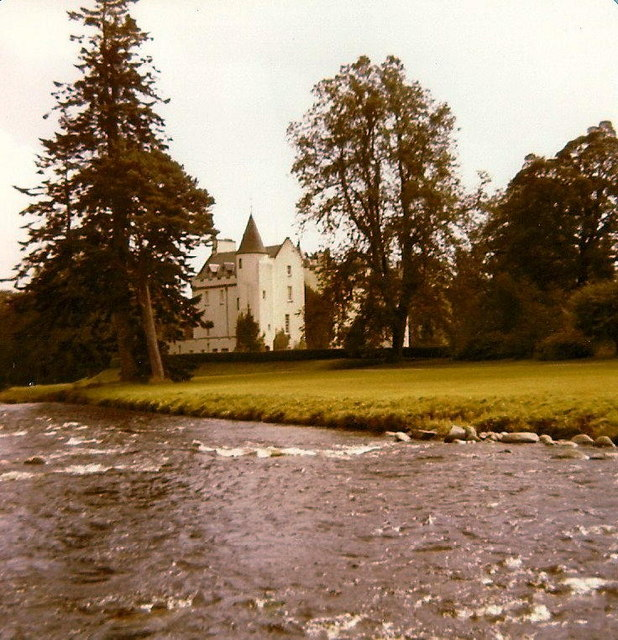
The castle across the South Esk river in 1980

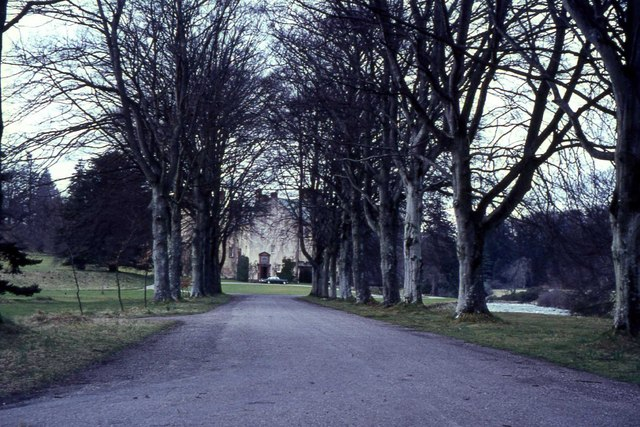
Pathway to the castle in 1967
