= James Ogilvy, 1st Earl of Airlie =

James Ogilvy, 1st Earl of Airlie (c. 1593 – 1666) was a Scottish royalist of the Wars of the Three Kingdoms.

== Life ==
The son of James Ogilvy, 6th Lord Ogilvy of Airlie by his first wife, Lady Jean Ruthven, daughter of William Ruthven, 1st Earl of Gowrie, he was born probably about 1593. He succeeded his father as Lord Ogilvy about 1618.

For Ogilvy's support of the royalist cause, during the struggle between the court and the Scottish Presbyterians, Charles I created him Earl of Airlie by patent dated at York 2 April 1639. During the Bishops' War he suffered severely, with his estates wasted and his houses razed to the ground. He went to court in April 1640 to avoid taking the covenant, but, returning to Scotland, was present in the covenanting parliament of 1643. In the following year he and his three sons joined James Graham, 1st Marquess of Montrose; they were consequently forfeited by parliament on 11 February 1645, exempted from pardon in the treaty of Westminster, and excommunicated by the Church of Scotland on 27 July 1647.

Ogilvy obtained on 23 July 1646 an assurance and remission from Major-general John Middleton, who was authorised to pacify the north of Scotland in this way. Parliament was then obliged, reluctantly, to rescind his forfeiture on 17 March 1647. He did not take any further part in public affairs, and died in 1666.

== Family ==
Ogilvy married about 1614 Lady Isabel Hamilton, second daughter of Thomas Hamilton, 1st Earl of Haddington, by whom he had three sons and two daughters. The sons were James Ogilvy, 2nd Earl of Airlie, Sir Thomas and Sir David Ogilvy. One daughter, Isabel, enabled her brother James to escape from the castle of St. Andrews on the eve of his intended execution; she died unmarried. Her sister, Elizabeth, married in 1642 Sir John Carnegie of Balnamoon, Forfarshire.

== Notes ==
Attribution

This article incorporates text from a publication now in the public domain: Lee, Sidney, ed. (1895). "Ogilvy, James (1593?-1666)". Dictionary of National Biography. Vol. 42. London: Smith, Elder & Co.

Peerage of Scotland
| New creation | Earl of Airlie; 1639–1665 | Succeeded by James Ogilvy |
| Preceded by James Ogilvy | Lord Ogilvy of Airlie; 1617–1665 | Succeeded by James Ogilvy |
